= Washington, D.C., in the American Civil War =

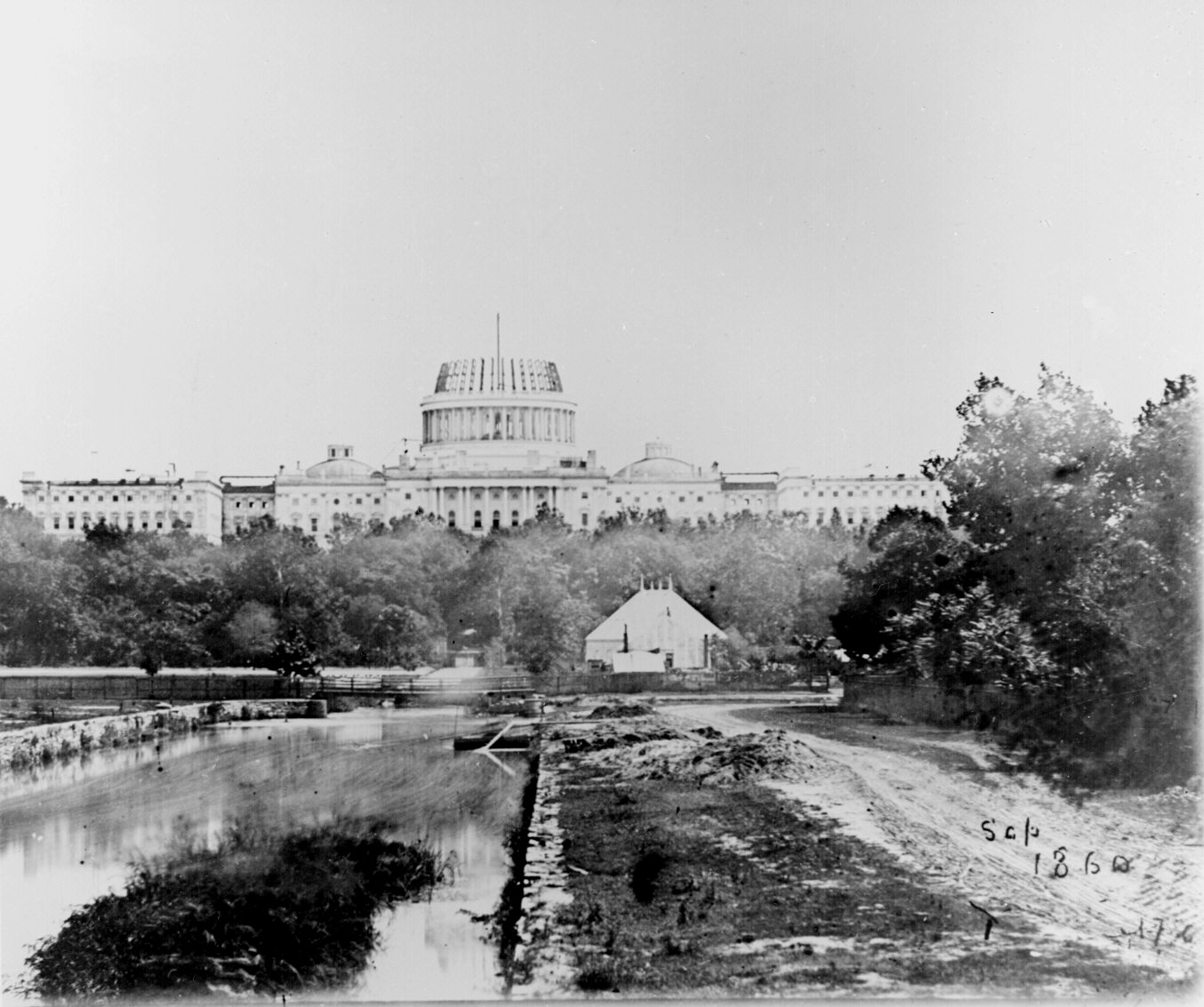
President Abraham Lincoln insisted that construction of the United States Capitol continue during the American Civil War.

During the American Civil War (1861–1865), Washington, D.C., the capital city of the United States, was the center of the Union war effort, which rapidly turned it from a small city into a major capital with full civic infrastructure and strong defenses.

The shock of the Union defeat at the First Battle of Bull Run in July 1861, with demoralized troops wandering the streets of the capital, caused President Abraham Lincoln to order extensive fortifications and a large garrison. That required an influx of troops, military suppliers and building contractors, which would set up a new demand for accommodation, including military hospitals. The abolition of slavery in Washington in 1862 also attracted many freedmen to the city. Except for one attempted invasion by Confederate cavalry leader Jubal Early in 1864, the capital remained impregnable.

When Lincoln was assassinated in Ford's Theater in April 1865, thousands flocked into Washington to view the coffin, further raising the profile of the city. The new president, Andrew Johnson, wanted to dispel the funereal atmosphere and organized a program of victory parades, which revived public hopes for the future.

== Early stages of war ==
Inauguration of Abraham Lincoln beneath the unfinished dome of the United States Capitol on March 4, 1861

Despite being the nation's capital city, Washington remained a small city that was virtually deserted during the torrid summertime until the outbreak of the Civil War. In February 1861, the Peace Congress, a last-ditch attempt by delegates from 21 of the 34 states to avert what many saw as the impending civil war, met in the city's Willard Hotel. The strenuous effort failed, and the war started in April 1861.

At first, it looked as if neighboring Virginia would remain in the Union. When it unexpectedly voted for secession, there was a serious danger that the divided state of Maryland would do the same, which would totally surround the capital with enemy states. President Abraham Lincoln’s act in jailing Maryland's pro-slavery leaders without trial saved the capital from that fate.

Faced with an open rebellion that had turned hostile, Lincoln began organizing a military force to protect Washington. Only 300 to 400 marines at the Marine Barracks, a small unit at the Washington Arsenal, and a nebulous militia protected the federal city. The Confederates desired to occupy Washington and massed to take it. On April 10 forces began to trickle into the city. On April 19, the Baltimore riot threatened the arrival of further reinforcements. Andrew Carnegie led the building of a railroad that circumvented Baltimore, allowing soldiers to arrive on April 25, thereby saving the capital.

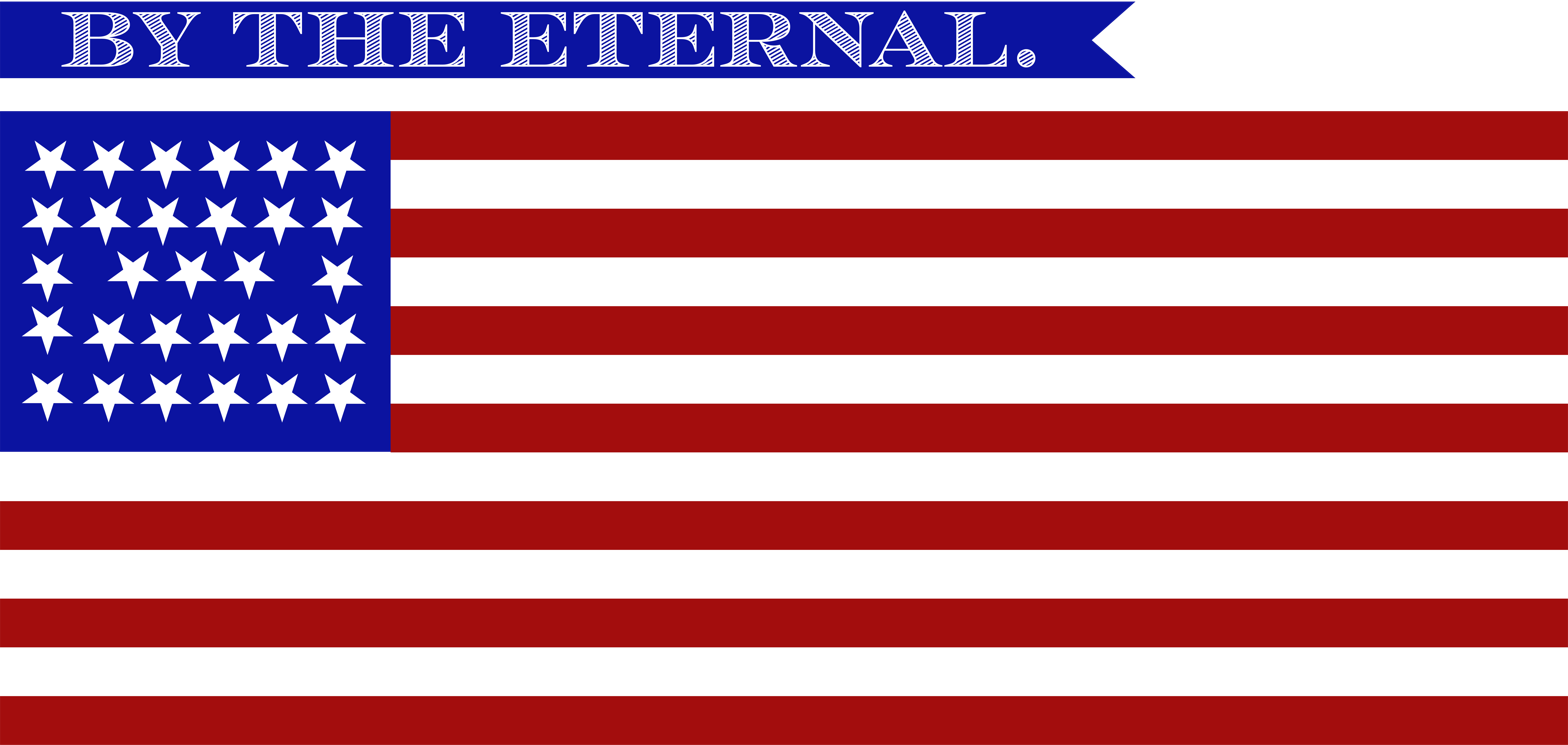
Digital reconstruction of the flag flown from the Equestrian statue of Andrew Jackson in January of 1861

Thousands of raw volunteers and many professional soldiers came to the area to fight for the Union. By mid-summer, Washington teemed with volunteer regiments and artillery batteries from throughout the North, all of which serviced by what was little more than a country town that in 1860 had only 75,800 people.^{[b]} George Templeton Strong's observation of Washington life led him to declare:

Of all the detestable places Washington is first. Crowd, heat, bad quarters, bad fair [fare], bad smells, mosquitos, and a plague of flies transcending everything within my experience.. . Beelzebub surely reigns here, and Willard's Hotel is his temple.

The city became the staging area for what became known as the Manassas campaign. When Brigadier General Irvin McDowell's beaten and demoralized army staggered back into Washington after the stunning Confederate victory at the First Battle of Bull Run. The realization came that the war might be prolonged caused the beginning of efforts to fortify the city to protect it from a Confederate assault. Lincoln knew that he had to have a professional and trained army to protect the capital area and so began by organizing the Department on the Potomac on August 4, 1861, and the Army of the Potomac 16 days later.

Most residents embraced the arriving troops, despite pockets of apathy and Confederate sympathizers. Upon hearing a Union regiment singing "John Brown's Body" as the soldiers marched beneath her window, the resident Julia Ward Howe wrote the patriotic "Battle Hymn of the Republic" to the same tune.

The significant expansion of the federal government to administer the ever-expanding war effort and its legacies, such as veterans' pensions, led to notable growth in the city's population, especially in 1862 and 1863, as the military forces and the supporting infrastructure dramatically expanded from early war days. The 1860 Census had put the population at just over 75,000 persons, but by 1870, the district's population had grown to nearly 132,000. Warehouses, supply depots, ammunition dumps, and factories were established to provide and distribute material for the Union armies, and civilian workers and contractors flocked to the city.

Slavery was abolished throughout the district on April 16, 1862, eight months before Lincoln issued the Emancipation Proclamation, with the passage of the Compensated Emancipation Act. Washington became a popular place for formerly enslaved people to congregate, and many were employed in constructing the ring of fortresses that eventually surrounded the city.

== Defense ==
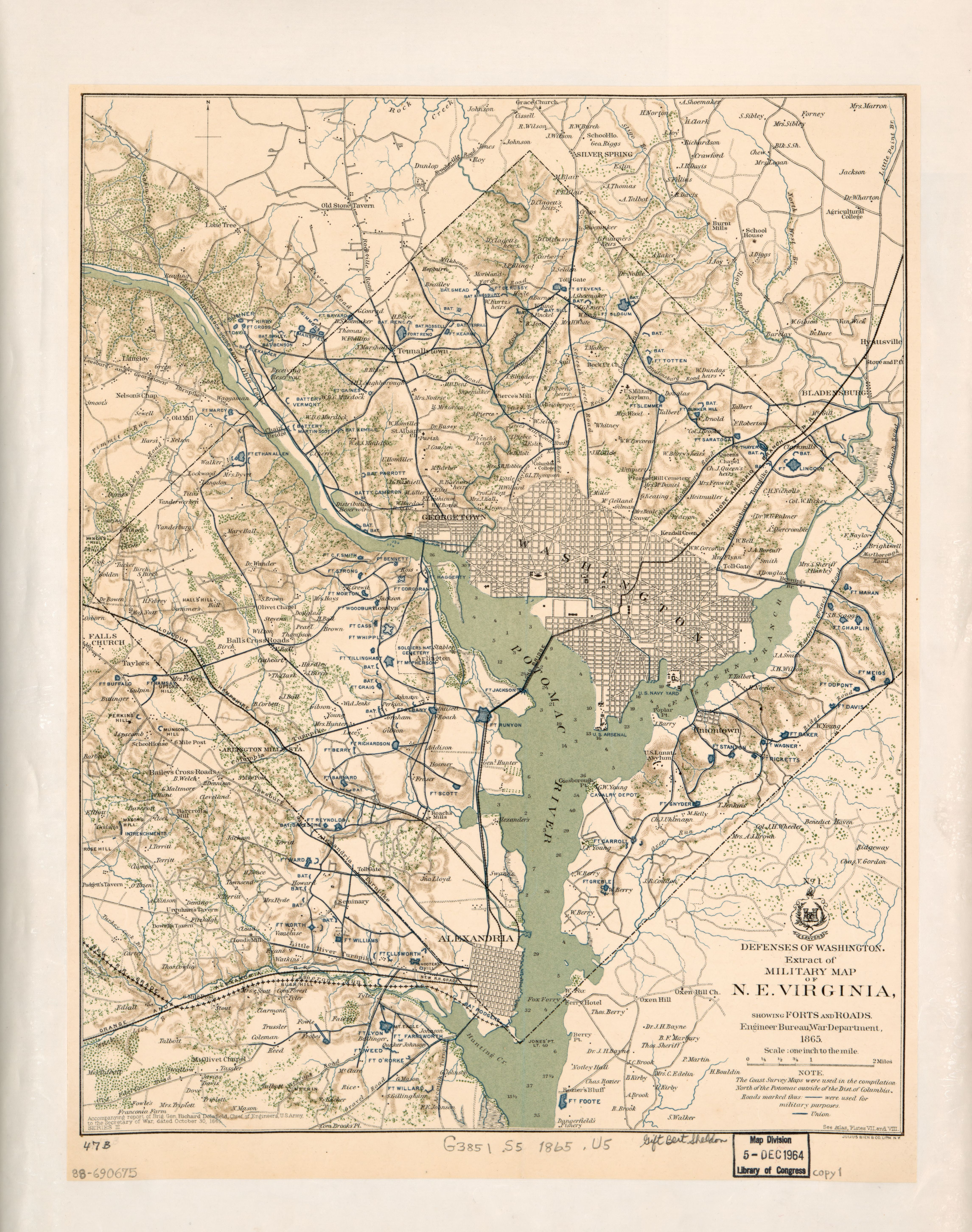
The enormous complex of defenses that protected Washington, D.C., during the Civil War in 1865.

At the beginning of the war, Washington's only defense was one old fort, Fort Washington, 12 miles (19 km) away to the south, and the Union Army soldiers themselves. When Maj. Gen. George B. McClellan assumed command of the Department of the Potomac on August 17, 1861, he became responsible for the capital's defense. McClellan began by laying out lines for a complete ring of entrenchments and fortifications that would cover 33 miles (53 km) of land. He built enclosed forts on high hills around the city and placed well-protected batteries of field artillery in the gaps between these forts, augmenting the 88 guns already placed on the defensive line facing Virginia and south. In between the batteries, interconnected rifle pits were dug, allowing highly-effective co-operative fire. That layout, once complete, would make the city one of the most heavily defended locations in the world and almost unassailable by nearly any number of men.

The capital's defenses, for the most part, deterred the Confederate Army from attacking. One notable exception was during the Battle of Fort Stevens on July 11–12, 1864 in which Union soldiers repelled troops under the command of Confederate Lieutenant General Jubal A. Early. That battle was the first time since that a U.S. president came under enemy fire in wartime when Lincoln visited the fort to observe the fighting.

By 1865, the defenses of Washington were most stout and amply covered both land and sea approaches. When the war ended, 37 miles (60 km) of line included at least 68 forts and over 20 miles (32 km) of rifle pits and were supported by 32 miles (51 km) of military-only roads and four individual picket stations. Also, 93 separate batteries of artillery had been placed on this line, comprising over 1,500 guns, both field and siege varieties, as well as mortars.

== Military formations ==
- Owens Company, District of Columbia cavalry {3 months unit-1861}
- 8 Battalions, District of Columbia Infantry {3 months unit-1861}
- 1st Regiment, District of Columbia Infantry
- 2nd Regiment, District of Columbia Infantry
- Unassigned District of Columbia Colored
- Unassigned District of Columbia Volunteers

== Hospitals ==
Hospitals in the Washington area became significant providers of medical services to wounded soldiers needing long-term care after they had been transported to the city from the front lines over the Long Bridge or by steamboat at the Wharf.

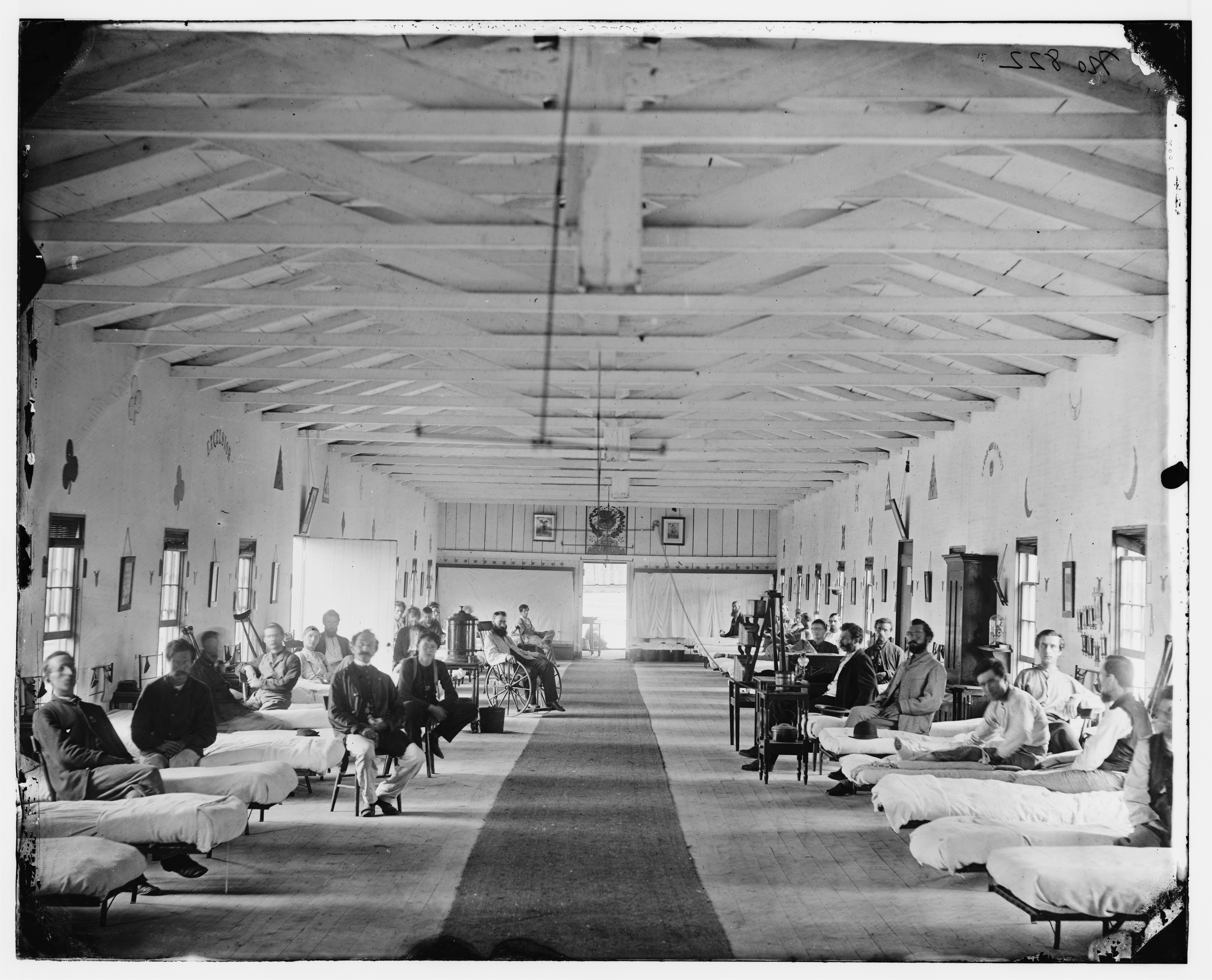
Patients in Ward K at the Armory Square General Hospital

The following hospitals were located in the District of Columbia:

- Armory Square General Hospital,
- Carver General Hospital
- Campbell General Hospital
- Columbia General Hospital
- Columbian General Hospital
- Douglas General Hospital
- Emory General Hospital
- Finley General Hospital
- Freedman General Hospital
- Harewood General Hospital
- Judiciary Square General Hospital
- Kalorama General Hospital
- Lincoln General Hospital
- Mount Pleasant General Hospital
- Ricord General Hospital
- Stanton General Hospital
- Seminary General Hospital
- Stone General Hospital

More than 20,000 injured or ill soldiers received treatment in an array of permanent and temporary hospitals in the capital, including the U.S. Patent Office and for a time the Capitol itself. Among the notables who served in nursing were the American Red Cross founder Clara Barton as well as Dorothea Dix, who served as superintendent of female nurses in Washington. The novelist Louisa May Alcott served at the Union Hospital in Georgetown. The poet Walt Whitman served as a hospital volunteer, and in 1865, he published his famous poem "The Wound-Dresser." The United States Sanitary Commission had a significant presence in Washington, as did the United States Christian Commission and other relief agencies. The Freedman's Hospital was established in 1862 to serve the needs of the growing population of freed slaves.

== Later stages of war ==
As the war progressed, the overcrowding severely strained the city's water supply. The Army Corps of Engineers constructed a new aqueduct that brought 10,000 US gallons (38,000 L; 8,300 imp gal) of fresh water to the city each day. Police and fire protection was increased, and work resumed to complete the unfinished dome of the Capitol Building. However, for most of the war, Washington suffered from unpaved streets, poor sanitation and garbage collection, swarms of mosquitos facilitated by the dank canals and sewers, and poor ventilation in most public and private buildings. That would change in the decade to follow under the leadership of District Governor Alexander "Boss" Shepherd.

Important political and military prisoners were often housed in the Old Capitol Prison in Washington, including accused spies Rose Greenhow and Belle Boyd as well as partisan ranger John S. Mosby. One inmate, Henry Wirz, the commandant of the Andersonville Prison in Georgia was hanged in the yard of the prison shortly after the war for his cruelty and neglect toward the Union prisoners of war.

== Lincoln's assassination ==
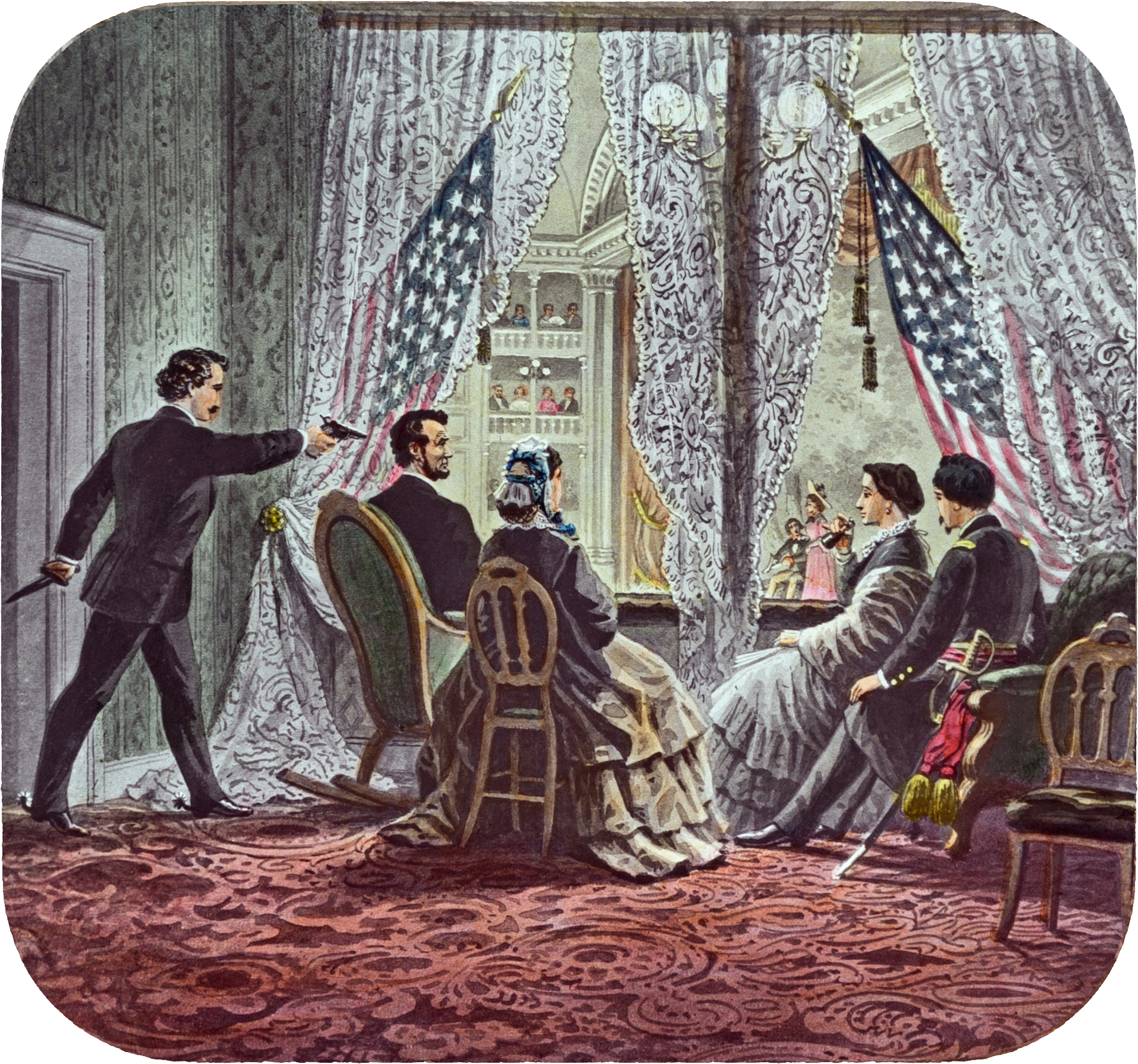
In the presidential booth of Ford's Theatre (from left to right) are: assassin John Wilkes Booth, Abraham Lincoln, Mary Todd Lincoln, Clara Harris, and Henry Rathbone

On April 14, 1865, just days after the end of the war, Lincoln was shot in Ford's Theater by John Wilkes Booth during the play Our American Cousin. At 7:22 the next morning, Lincoln died in the house across the street, the first American president to be assassinated. Secretary of War Edwin M. Stanton said, "Now he belongs to the ages" (or perhaps "angels"). The residents and visitors to the city experienced a wide array of reactions, from stunned disbelief to rage. Stanton took charge of the situation, directing the response to the assassination. Stanton immediately closed off most major roads and bridges, and the city was placed under martial law. Scores of residents and workers were questioned during the growing investigation, and some were detained or arrested on suspicion of having aided the assassins or for a perception that they were withholding information. Despite the bridges being closed, Booth was able to escape the city as the sentries were not aware of the assassination.

Also attacked was Secretary of State William Henry Seward, who was attacked by Booth's accomplice, Lewis Powell. However, Seward survived.

Lincoln's body was displayed in the Capitol rotunda, and thousands of Washington residents and as throngs of visitors stood in long queues for hours to glimpse the fallen president. Hotels and restaurants were filled to capacity, bringing an unexpected windfall to their owners. Following the identification and eventual arrest of the actual conspirators, the city was the site of the trial and execution of several of the assassins, and Washington was again the center of the nation's media attention.

== Grand Review of the Armies ==
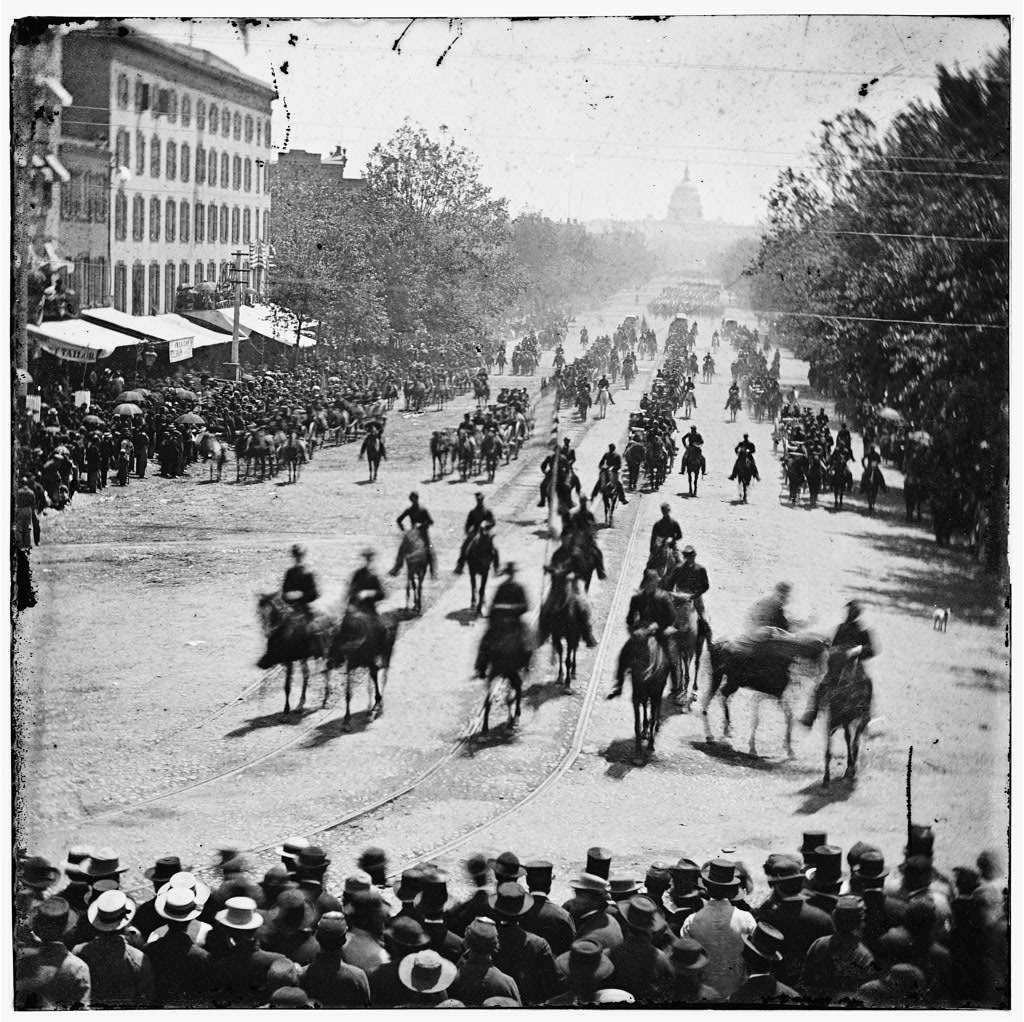
Grand Review of the Armies in May 1865

On May 9, 1865, the new president, Andrew Johnson, declared that the rebellion had virtually ended, and he planned with government authorities a formal review to honor the victorious troops. One of his side goals was to change the mood of the capital, which was still in mourning since the assassination. Three of the leading Union armies were close enough to travel to Washington to participate in the procession: the Army of the Potomac, the Army of the Tennessee, and the Army of Georgia. Officers in the three armies who had not seen one another for some time communed and renewed acquaintances, and at times, infantrymen engaged in verbal sparring and some fisticuffs in the town's taverns and bars over which army was superior.

The Army of the Potomac, led by General George Gordon Meade, was the first to parade through the city, on May 23, in a procession that stretched for seven miles. The mood in Washington was now one of gaiety and celebration, and the crowds and soldiers frequently engaged in singing patriotic songs as column passed the reviewing stand in front of the White House, where Johnson, General-in-Chief Ulysses S. Grant, senior military leaders, the Cabinet, and leading government officials awaited.

On the following day, William T. Sherman led the 65,000 men of the Army of the Tennessee and the Army of Georgia along Washington's streets past the cheering crowds. Within a week after the celebrations, both armies were disbanded, and many of the volunteer regiments and batteries were sent home to be mustered out of the army.

== Notable leaders ==
The District of Columbia and adjoining Georgetown were the birthplace of several Union Army generals and naval admirals and a leading Confederate Army commander.

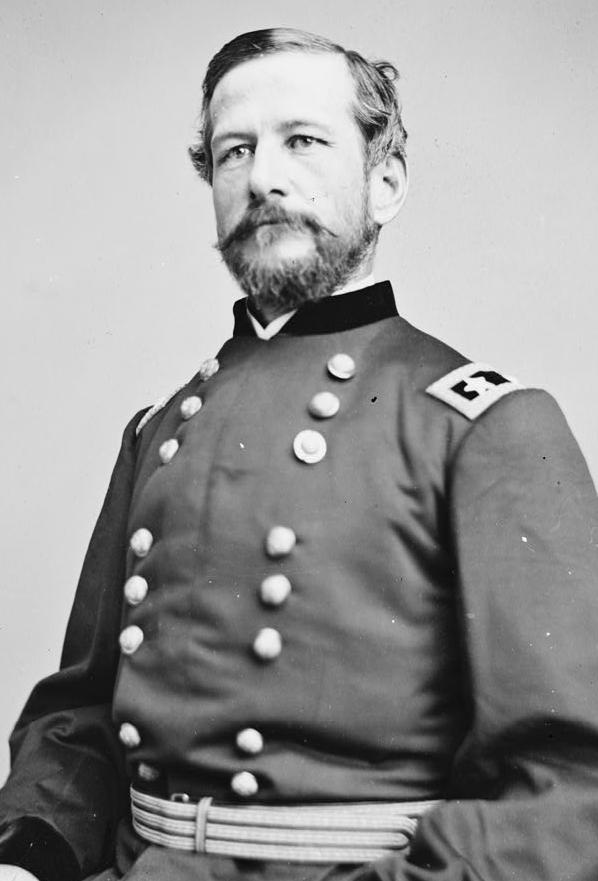
Maj. Gen.
Alfred Pleasonton
USA

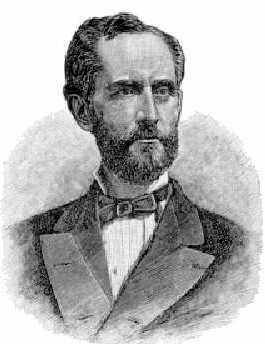
Maj. Gen.
Manning Force
USA

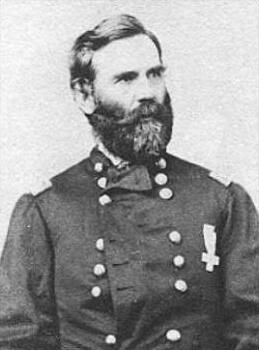
Bvt. Maj. Gen.
George W. Getty
USA

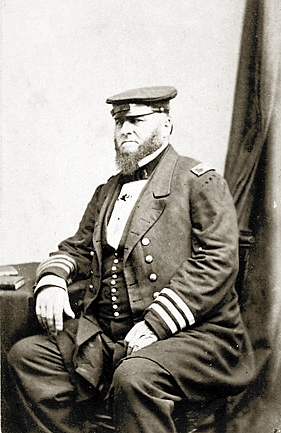
Admiral
Louis M. Goldsborough
USA

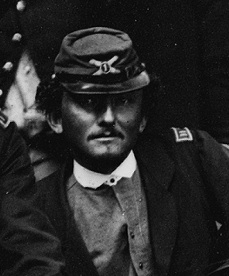
Maj. Gen.
William Montrose Graham, Jr.
USA

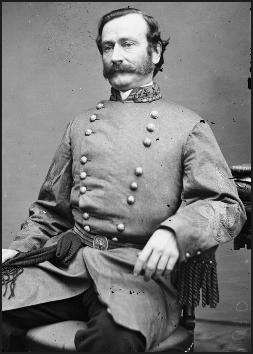
Maj. Gen.
Mansfield Lovell
CSA

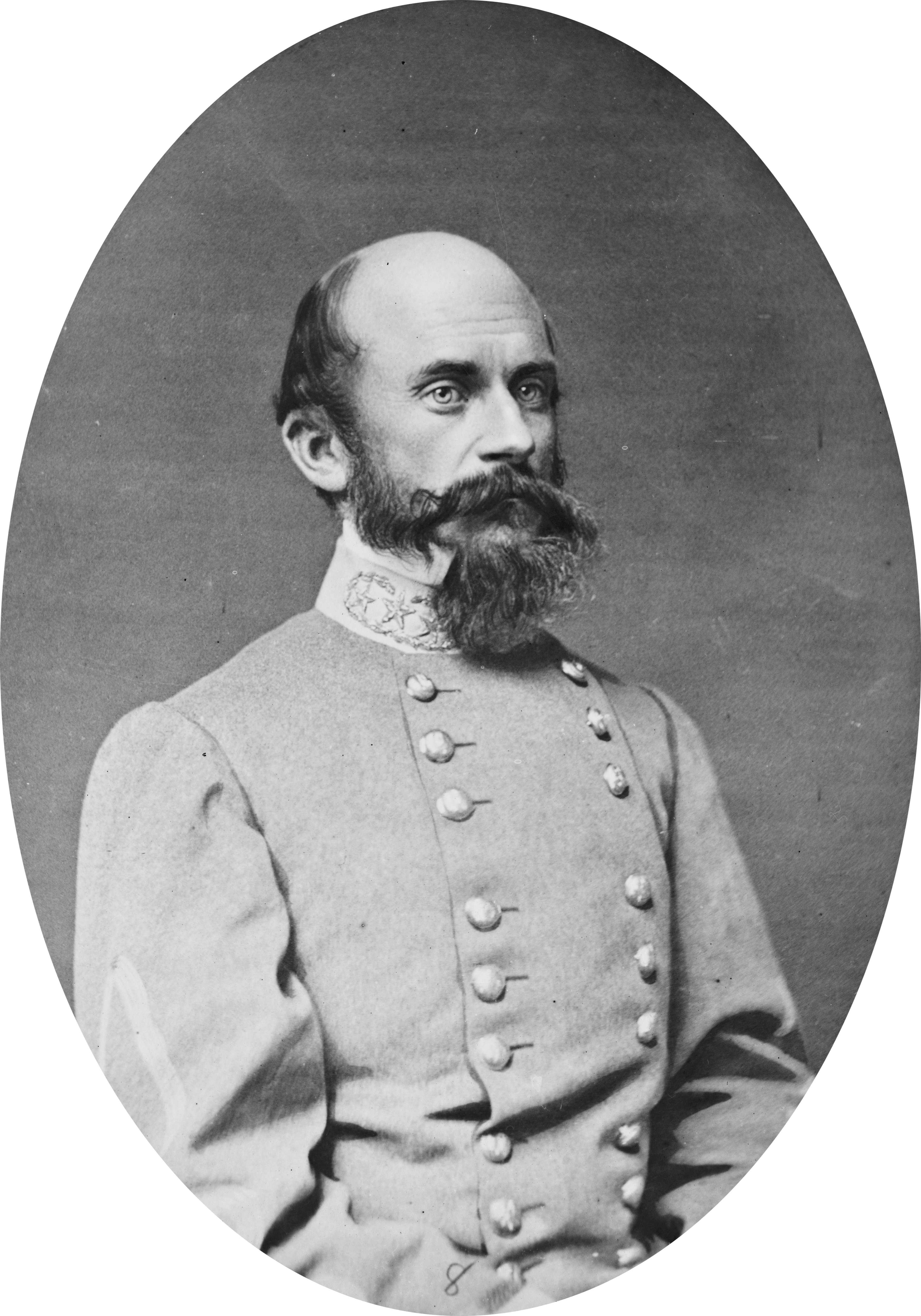
Lt. Gen.
Richard S. Ewell
CSA

Other important personalities of the Civil War born in the immediate Washington area included Confederate Senator Thomas Jenkins Semmes, Union general John Milton Brannan, John Rodgers Meigs (whose death sparked a significant controversy throughout the North), and Confederate brigade commander Richard Hanson Weightman.

== See also ==
- History of Washington, D.C.
- Civil War Defenses of Washington
- Bibliography of the American Civil War
- Bibliography of Abraham Lincoln
- Bibliography of Ulysses S. Grant
- Harewood General Hospital

== Notes ==
^[b]Data provided by "District of Columbia - Race and Hispanic Origin: 1800 to 1990" (PDF). United States Census Bureau. 2002-09-13. Until 1890, the U.S. Census Bureau counted the City of Washington, Georgetown, and unincorporated Washington County as three separate areas. The data provided in this article from before 1890 is calculated as if the District of Columbia were a single municipality as it is today. To view the population data for each specific area prior to 1890 see: Gibson, Campbell (June 1998). "Population of the 100 Largest Cities and Other Urban Places in the United States: 1790 to 1990". United States Census Bureau.
