= Thomas Mallon =

American novelist, essayist, and critic (born 1951)

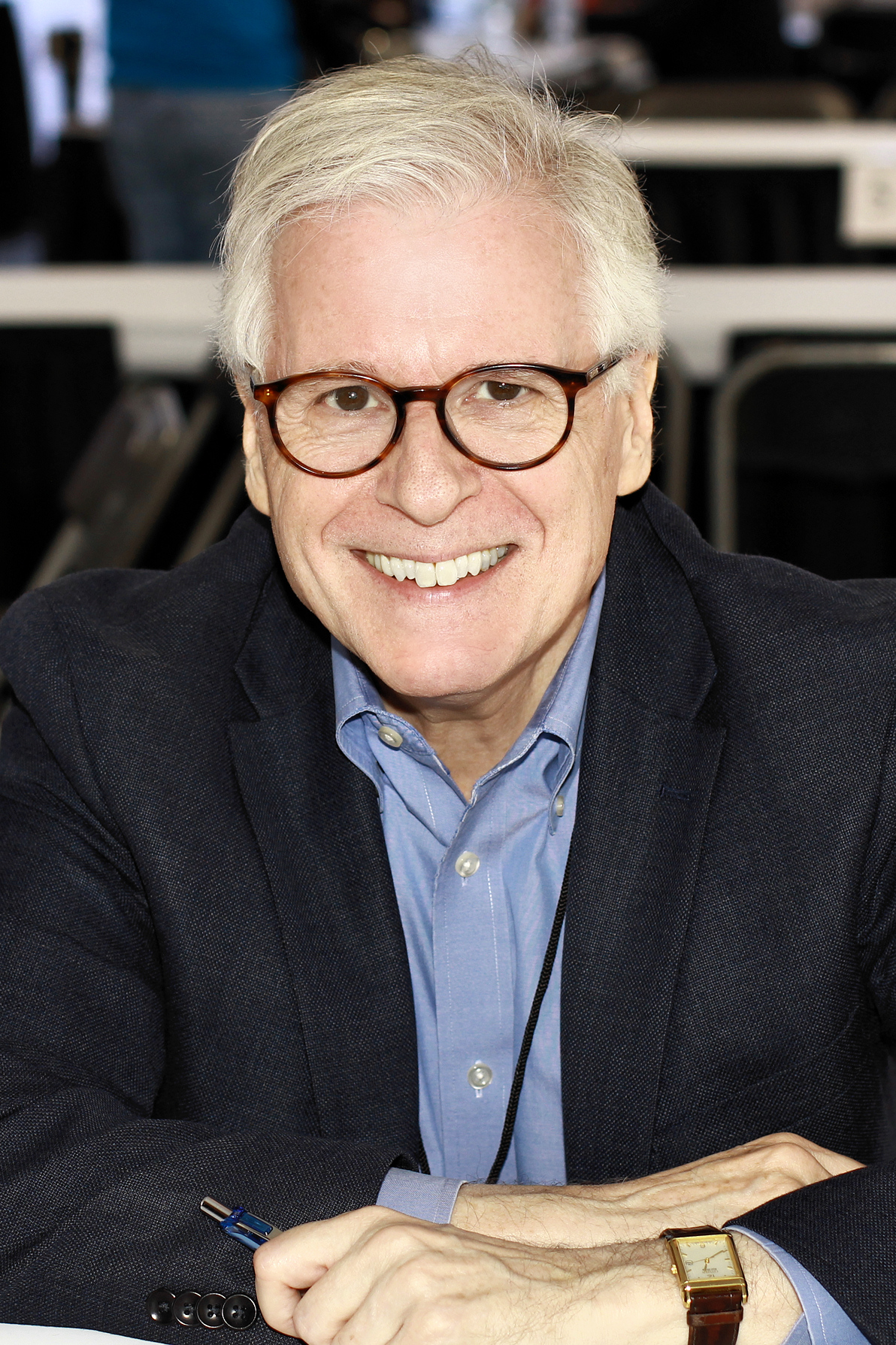
- Mallon in 2019
- Born: November 2, 1951 (age 75); Glen Cove, New York, U.S.
- Education: Brown University (BA); Harvard University (MA, PhD)
- Occupations: Novelist; essayist; critic
- Website: Official website

Thomas Mallon (born November 2, 1951) is an American novelist, essayist, and critic. He is the author of ten books of fiction, including Henry and Clara, Two Moons, Dewey Defeats Truman, Aurora 7, Bandbox, Fellow Travelers (adapted into a miniseries by the same name), Watergate, Finale, Landfall, and most recently Up With the Sun. He has also published nonfiction on plagiarism (Stolen Words), diaries (A Book of One's Own), letters (Yours Ever) and the assassination of John F. Kennedy (Mrs. Paine's Garage), as well as two volumes of essays (Rockets and Rodeos and In Fact).

He is a former literary editor of GQ, where he wrote the "Doubting Thomas" column in the 1990s, and has contributed frequently to The New Yorker, The New York Times Book Review, The Atlantic Monthly, The American Scholar, and other periodicals. He was appointed a member of the National Council on the Humanities in 2002 and served as Deputy Chairman of the National Endowment for the Humanities from 2005 to 2006.

His honors include Guggenheim and Rockefeller fellowships, the National Book Critics Circle citation for reviewing, and the Vursell Memorial Award of the American Academy of Arts and Letters for distinguished prose style. He was elected as a new member of the American Academy of Arts and Sciences in 2012.

== Early life and education ==
Thomas Vincent Mallon was born in Glen Cove, New York, and grew up in Stewart Manor – both in Nassau County, on Long Island. His father, Arthur Mallon, was a salesman and his mother, Caroline, kept the home. Mallon graduated from Sewanhaka High School in 1969. He has often said that he had "the kind of happy childhood that is so damaging to a writer".

Mallon studied English at Brown University, where he wrote his undergraduate honors thesis on American author Mary McCarthy. He credits McCarthy, with whom he later became friends, as the most enduring influence on his career as a writer. He earned a Master of Arts and a PhD from Harvard University, where he wrote his dissertation on the English World War I poet Edmund Blunden. On sabbatical from Vassar College in 1982–1983, Mallon spent a year as a visiting scholar at St. Edmund's House (later College) at Cambridge University, where he drafted most of A Book of One's Own, a work of nonfiction about diarists and diary-writing.

== Career ==
Mallon's writing style has been described as characterized by wit, charm and attention to detail and character development. His nonfiction often explores "fringe" genres – diaries, letters, plagiarism – just as his fiction frequently tells the stories of characters "on the fringes of big events".

A Book of One's Own, an informal guide to the great diaries of literature, was published in 1984 and gave Mallon his first measure of critical acclaim. Richard Eder, writing in the Los Angeles Times, called the book "an engaging meditation on the varied and irrepressible spirit of life that insists on preserving itself on paper." In A Book of One's Own, Mallon covers a wide range of diarists from Samuel Pepys to Anaïs Nin. He explained his enthusiasm for the genre by saying: "Writing books is too good an idea to be left to authors." The success of A Book of One's Own won Mallon a Rockefeller Fellowship in 1986. The book's unexpected success earned Mallon tenure at Vassar College, where he taught English from 1979 to 1991.

Mallon then began publishing fiction, a genre in which he had dabbled throughout childhood and young adulthood. Mallon published his first novel, Arts and Sciences, in 1988 about Arthur Dunne, a 22-year-old Harvard University graduate student in English. Soon after its publication, in 1989, Mallon released a second nonfiction book called Stolen Words: Forays Into the Origins and Ravages of Plagiarism.

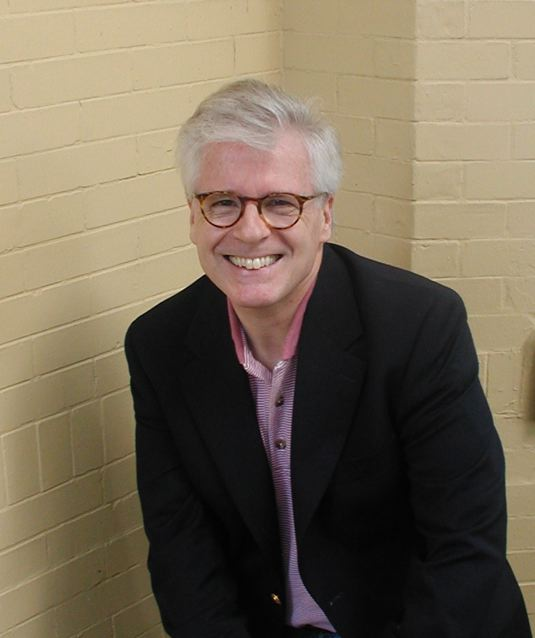
Thomas Mallon in 2009

Henry and Clara, published in 1994, established Mallon as a writer of historical fiction from that point forward. The novel traces the lives of Major Henry Rathbone and Clara Harris, the young couple who accompanied Abraham Lincoln to Ford's Theatre on April 14, 1865. A story of star-crossed lovers intermingles with personal and political tragedies and spans the couple's first meeting in childhood to their eventual derangement. Mallon's writing career took a dramatic turn when John Updike praised Henry and Clara in The New Yorker, calling Mallon "one of the most interesting American novelists at work."

Historical fiction, Mallon has declared in interviews, is the genre in which he is most interested as a writer. "I think the main thing that has led me to write historical fiction is that it is a relief from the self," he explains. American political history has been perhaps his main subject and interest; in 1994, he ghostwrote former Vice President Dan Quayle's memoir, Standing Firm.

After the publication of Henry and Clara, Mallon went on to write seven more works of historical fiction, including his most recent novels, Watergate (2012), Finale (2015), and Landfall (2019). Watergate, a finalist for the 2013 PEN/Faulkner Award for Fiction, is a retelling of the Watergate scandal from the perspective of seven characters, some familiar to the public memory, such as Richard Nixon's secretary Rose Mary Woods, and some brought to light from the sidelines of the scandal, such as Fred LaRue. Finale: A Novel of the Reagan Years, one of The New York Times' 100 Notable Books of 2015, takes readers to the political gridiron of Washington in 1986; the wealthiest enclaves of southern California; and the volcanic landscape of Iceland, where President Ronald Reagan engages in two almost apocalyptic days of negotiation with Mikhail Gorbachev. Readers of Finale find themselves in the shoes of many characters both central and peripheral to the Reagan presidency – from Nancy Reagan to Richard Nixon to actress Bette Davis.

Published in 2019, Landfall takes place during the George W. Bush years against a backdrop of political catastrophe, including the Iraqi insurgency and Hurricane Katrina. At the center of the narrative is a love affair between two West Texans, Ross Weatherall and Allison O'Connor, whose destinies have been intertwined with Bush's for decades.

In June 2025, Knopf published Mallon's The Very Heart of It: New York Diaries, 1983-1994, a selection of his journal entries from that time. Described as a gay coming of age chronicle set in New York City during the early days of the AIDS epidemic, this work also traces Mallon's career at Vassar College and GQ, as well as highlights many of the famous people with whom he crossed paths during those eleven years.

== Accolades ==
- Phi Beta Kappa, 1972
- Rockefeller Fellowship, 1986–87
- Ingram Merrill Award (for outstanding work as a writer), 1994
- Great Lakes Book Award for Fiction, 1998, for Dewey Defeats Truman
- National Book Critics Circle Award (Nona Balakian Citation) for Excellence in Reviewing, 1998
- Guggenheim Fellowship, 2000–2001
- Dictionary of Literary Biography Award for Distinguished Criticism, 2002
- Finalist for 2007 Lambda Literary Award for Fellow Travelers
- American Academy of Arts and Letters' Harold D. Vursell Memorial Award for prose style ($10,000 prize; conferred May 2011)
- Elected to American Academy of Arts and Sciences, 2012
- Finalist, PEN/Faulkner Award for Fiction (For Watergate, 2013)

== Personal life ==
Openly gay, Mallon currently lives with his longtime partner, William Bodenschatz, in Washington, D.C., and is a professor emeritus of English at The George Washington University. He once described himself as a "supposed literary intellectual/homosexual/Republican." During the 2016 election, he was actively involved in Scholars and Writers Against Trump, a group of disaffected conservatives. He left the Republican Party in November 2016.

== See also ==
- List of historical novelists
- Fellow Travelers (opera)
- Fellow Travelers (miniseries)

== Bibliography ==
=== Books ===
==== Nonfiction ====
- Edmund Blunden. Boston: Twayne. 1983.
- A Book of One's Own: People and Their Diaries. Ticknor & Fields. 1984.
- Stolen Words: Forays into the Origins and Ravages of Plagiarism. Ticknor & Fields. 1989.
- Rockets and Rodeos and Other American Spectacles. Diane Publishing Co. 1993.
- In Fact: Essays on Writers and Writing. Pantheon. 2001.
- Mrs. Paine's Garage and the Murder of John F. Kennedy. Pantheon. 2002.
- Yours Ever: People and Their Letters. Pantheon. 2009.
- The Very Heart of It: New York Diaries, 1983-1994. 2025.

==== Fiction ====
- Arts and Science: A Seventies Seduction. Ticknor & Fields. 1988.
- Aurora 7. Ticknor & Fields. 1991.
- Henry and Clara. Ticknor & Fields. 1994.
- Dewey Defeats Truman. Pantheon. 1997.
- Two Moons. Pantheon. 2000.
- Bandbox. Pantheon. 2004.
- Fellow Travelers. Pantheon. 2007.
- Watergate: A Novel. Pantheon. 2012.
- Finale: A Novel. Pantheon. 2015.
- Landfall: A Novel. Pantheon. 2019.
- Up with the Sun. Knopf. 2023.

=== Critical studies and reviews of Mallon's work ===
- Alabanese, Andrew Richard (November 30, 2009). "Man of letters". Publishers Weekly: 22–24.
- Maslin, Janet (February 15, 2012). "Nixon and friends, stalked with literary license: 'Watergate,' a novel by Thomas Mallon". Books of the Times. The New York Times.
- Birns, Nicholas (2009). "Thomas Mallon". American Writers. Supplement (XIX): 131–47. Survey of Mallon's career up to 2008.
- Bliven, Naomi (January 21, 1985). "Quiddities". The New Yorker. 60 (49): 92–93. Review of A book of one's own.
- Gibbons, Kaye (February 8, 2004). "The '20s roar again with rollicking energy". The Atlanta Journal-Constitution. Review of Bandbox.
- Maslin, Janet (February 15, 2012). "Nixon and friends, stalked with literary license: 'Watergate,' a novel by Thomas Mallon". Books of the Times. The New York Times.
- Pritchard, William H. (January 14, 2001). "The company he keeps". The New York Times Book Review: 13. Review of In fact : essays on writers and writing.
- Schiff, Stacy (November 29, 2009). "Please Mr. Postman". The New York Times Book Review: 13. Review of Yours Ever.
- Smith, Wendy (April 29, 2007). "Opportunism knocks". Los Angeles Times Book Review. Review of Fellow Travelers.
- Swaim, Barton (February 15, 2019). "‘Landfall’ Review: How It Really Never Happened." The Wall Street Journal. Review of Landfall.
- Upchurch, Michael (January 20, 2002). "How history happens". Chicago Tribune. Review of Mrs. Paine's Garage and the murder of John F. Kennedy.
