= Ira Harris =

American politician and lawyer

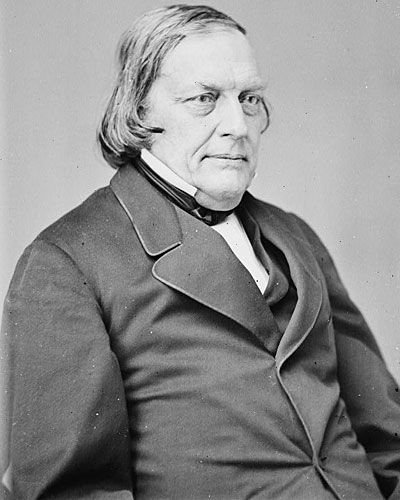
- Harris c. 1855–65

United States Senator from New York
- In office March 4, 1861 – March 3, 1867
- Preceded by: William H. Seward
- Succeeded by: Roscoe Conkling

1st Chancellor of the University of Rochester
- In office 1850–1853
- Succeeded by: W. Allen Wallis

Personal details
- Born: May 31, 1802 Charleston, New York, U.S.
- Died: December 2, 1875 (aged 73) Albany, New York, U.S.
- Party: Whig, Republican
- Spouses: Clarissa T. Harris; Pauline Rathbone
- Profession: Lawyer, politician, judge, professor

Ira Harris (May 31, 1802 – December 2, 1875) was an American jurist and senator from New York. He was also a friend of Abraham Lincoln.

== Life ==
Ira Harris was born in Charleston, New York on May 31, 1802. He grew up on a farm, and graduated from Union College in 1824. He then studied law in Albany and, in 1827, was admitted to the bar.

He was a Whig/Anti-Rent member of the New York State Assembly (Albany Co.) in 1845 and 1846. He was a delegate to the New York State Constitutional Convention of 1846 and a member of the New York State Senate (3rd D.) in 1847.

He was a justice of the New York Supreme Court (3rd D.) from 1847 to 1859 and was, ex officio, a judge of the New York Court of Appeals in 1850 and 1858.

== U.S. Senate ==
In February 1861, Harris was elected a U.S. Senator from New York to succeed William H. Seward who did not seek re-election, but would be appointed U.S. Secretary of State by Abraham Lincoln. In the U.S. Senate, Harris served on the Committees on Foreign Relations, the Judiciary, and the Select Joint Committee on the Southern States. Although he supported the administration in the main, he did not fear to express his opposition to all measures, however popular at the time, that did not appear to him either wise or just. He visited Lincoln at the White House often and grew a friendship with him. He was also a good friend of his predecessor in the Senate, William H. Seward.

His son William Hamilton Harris (1838-1895) was a brevet lieutenant colonel in the United States Army Ordnance Department. His daughter Clara Harris and his stepson/future son-in-law Henry Rathbone were the Lincolns' guests at Ford's Theatre on April 14, 1865, when the president was shot and killed by John Wilkes Booth. Booth stabbed Rathbone in the arm when he tried to stop the assassin from escaping. Clara and Henry were married in 1867, but were also step siblings – Harris had remarried to Pauline Rathbone, Henry's mother.

Judge Harris was, for more than twenty years, a professor of equity, jurisprudence and practice in the Albany Law School and, during his senatorial term, delivered a course of lectures at the law school of Columbian University (now George Washington University), Washington, D.C. In the Senate, he also served on the Joint Committee on Reconstruction which drafted the Fourteenth Amendment to the United States Constitution.

Ira Harris died in Albany on December 2, 1875. He was buried at the Albany Rural Cemetery with his first wife, Clarissa.

His grandson, Henry Riggs Rathbone, was a congressman from Illinois.

== Notes ==
New York State Senate
Preceded by John C. Wright	New York State Senate; Third District (Class 4); 1847	Succeeded by district abolished
U.S. Senate
Preceded by William H. Seward	U.S. senator (Class 3) from New York; 1861–1867; Served alongside: Preston King and Edwin D. Morgan	Succeeded by Roscoe Conkling
