= William E. Mason (American politician) =

American politician (1850–1921)

William Ernest Mason
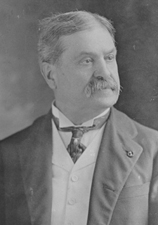

United States Senator from Illinois
- In office March 4, 1897 – March 3, 1903
- Preceded by: John M. Palmer
- Succeeded by: Albert J. Hopkins

Member of the U.S. House of Representatives from Illinois
- In office March 4, 1887 – March 3, 1891
- Preceded by: James Hugh Ward
- Succeeded by: Allan C. Durborow, Jr.
- Constituency: 3rd district
- In office March 4, 1917 – June 16, 1921
- Preceded by: William E. Williams
- Succeeded by: Winnifred S. M. Huck
- Constituency: At-large

Member of the Illinois Senate

Member of the Illinois House of Representatives

Personal details
- Born: July 7, 1850 Franklinville, New York, U.S.
- Died: June 16, 1921 (aged 70) Washington, D.C., U.S.
- Party: Republican
- Spouse: Edith
- Children: 6 (including Lowell)

William Ernest Mason (July 7, 1850 – June 16, 1921) was a Republican U.S. representative and senator from Illinois. He was the father of Winnifred Sprague Mason Huck.

Mason was born in Franklinville, New York. His family moved to Bentonsport, Iowa when he was 8. He attended Birmingham College. After graduating, he taught at Bentonsport Academy, which he had previously attended. After studying law, he moved to Chicago in 1872 and was admitted to the bar.

Mason was elected to Congress in 1886 and again two years later. Following his defeat in 1890, he returned to law practice in Chicago in 1891 but was elected to the U.S. Senate in 1896. After one term, he returned to Chicago. He served three more terms in the House from 1917 until his death. Mason often was an opponent of U.S. intervention in foreign affairs. He delivered a fiery speech advocating self-governance for the Philippines during the Philippine–American War at the turn of the 20th century: "You cannot govern the Philippine Islands without taxing them. You have not yet their consent to tax them. You propose again to tax them without representation. Look out for tea parties" On April 5, 1917, he was one of 50 representatives who voted against declaring war on Germany.

He is buried in Oakwood Cemetery in Waukegan, Illinois.

== See also ==
- 1914 United States Senate election in Illinois
- List of members of the United States Congress who died in office (1900–1949)

U.S. House of Representatives
Preceded by James H. Ward	Member of the U.S. House of Representatives from Illinois's 3rd congressional district 1887–1891	Succeeded by Allan C. Durborow, Jr.
Preceded by William E. Williams	Member of the U.S. House of Representatives from Illinois's at-large congressional district March 4, 1917 – June 16, 1921	Succeeded by Winnifred S. M. Huck
U.S. Senate
Preceded by John M. Palmer	U.S. senator (Class 3) from Illinois; 1897–1903; Served alongside: Shelby M. Cullom	Succeeded by Albert J. Hopkins
