= Henry R. Rathbone =

American politician

Henry Riggs Rathbone
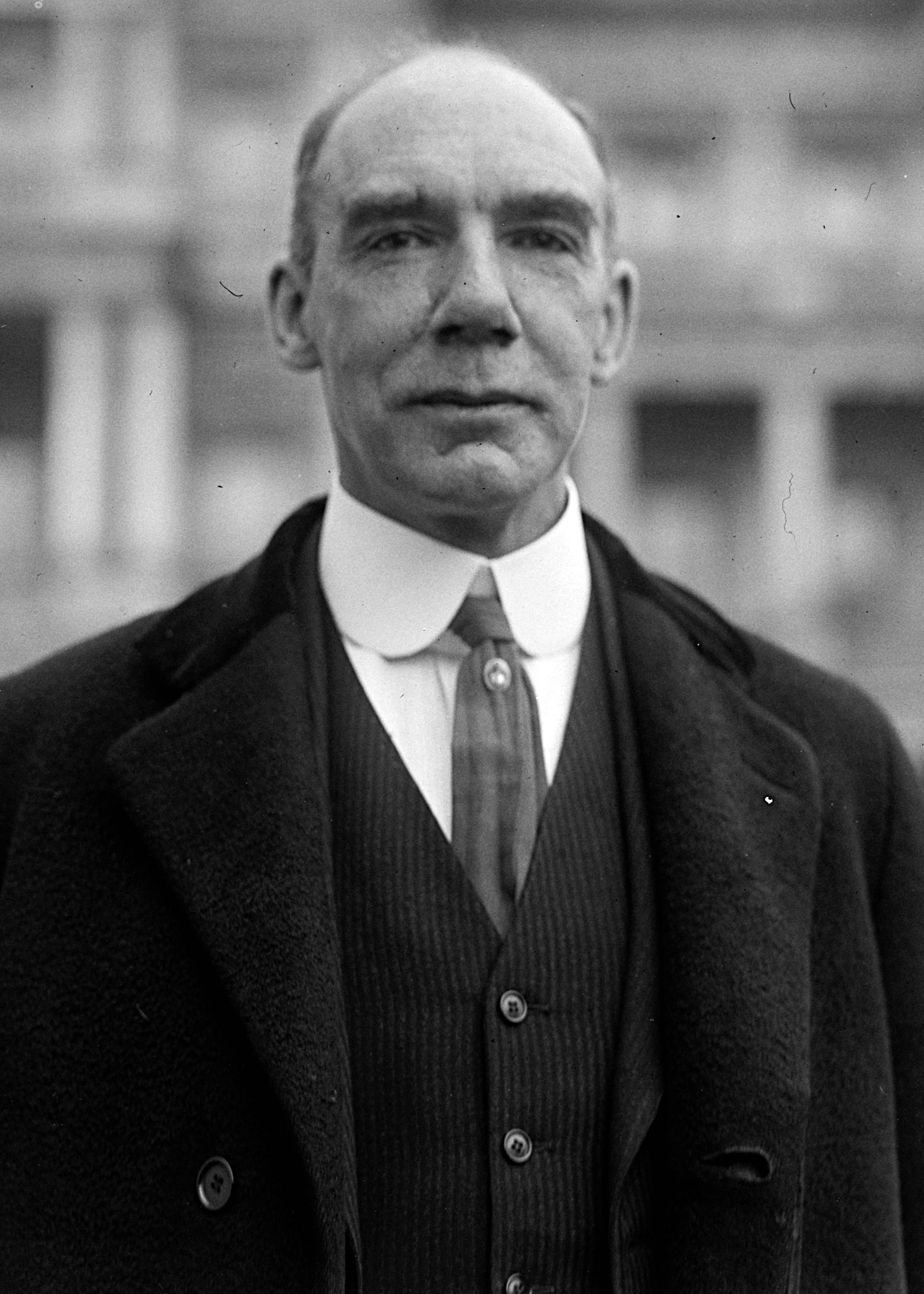
- Rathbone in 1923

Member of the U.S. House of Representatives from Illinois's at-large district
- In office March 4, 1923 – July 15, 1928
- Preceded by: Winnifred Sprague Mason Huck
- Succeeded by: Richard Yates Jr.

Personal details
- Born: February 12, 1870 Washington, D.C., US
- Died: July 15, 1928 (aged 58) Chicago, Illinois, US
- Party: Republican
- Education: Yale University; University of Wisconsin
- Profession: Politician, Lawyer

Henry Riggs Rathbone (February 12, 1870 – July 15, 1928) was a congressman from Illinois. He served Illinois's at-large congressional district from 1923 until his death in 1928.

== Early life ==
Rathbone was born in Washington, D.C., to Brevet Colonel Henry Reed Rathbone and Clara Rathbone née Harris. His maternal grandfather, Ira Harris, was a United States Senator representing New York, while his paternal grandfather, Jared Lewis Rathbone, was the first elected Mayor of Albany, New York.

Rathbone's parents had been guests in the presidential box when Abraham Lincoln was assassinated on April 14, 1865. He moved to Hanover, Germany, with his family in 1882. The next year, his father murdered his mother and tried to kill himself, then was admitted to an asylum for the criminally insane in Hildesheim; Henry and his siblings were returned to the United States to be raised by their uncle, William Harris.

Rathbone graduated from Phillips Academy in 1888, from Yale University in 1892, and from the Law Department at the University of Wisconsin in 1894, after which he commenced practicing law in Chicago.

== Political career ==
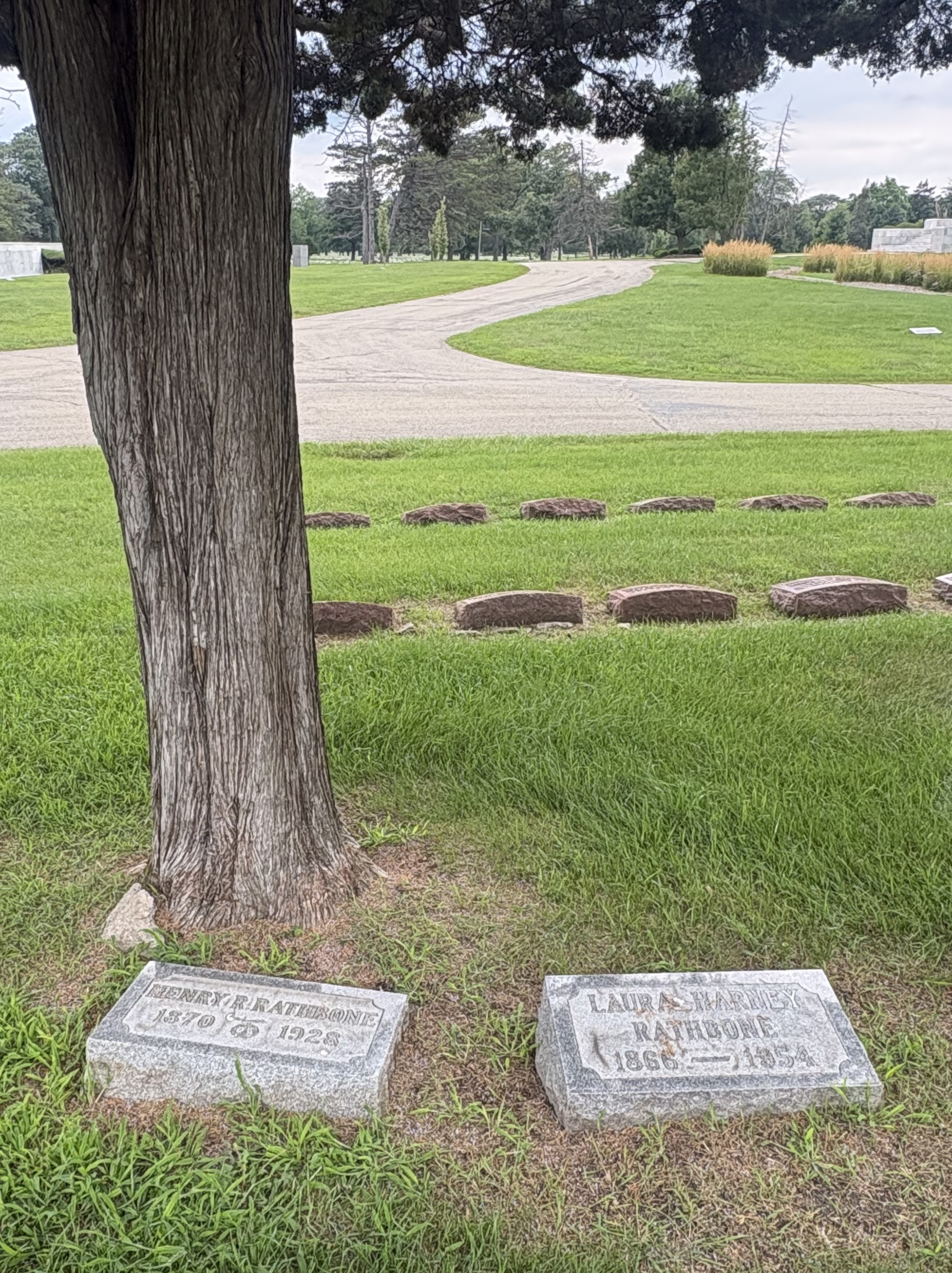
Rathbone's grave at Acacia Park Cemetery

Rathbone later became involved in politics. He was a delegate to the Republican National Convention in 1916 which nominated Charles Evans Hughes for the presidency. He was elected as a Republican to the United States House of Representatives in 1922, and served from 1923 until his death in 1928. Rathbone also served one year as President of the Illinois State Society of Washington, D.C., until his death in Chicago on July 15, 1928. He was buried at Acacia Park Cemetery in Norwood Park Township, Illinois.

== See also ==
- List of members of the United States Congress who died in office (1900–1949)

U.S. House of Representatives
Preceded by Winnifred Sprague Mason Huck	Member of the U.S. House of Representatives from Illinois's at-large congressional district March 4, 1923 – July 15, 1928	Succeeded by Ruth Hanna McCormick
