= Winnifred Mason Huck =

American journalist and politician (1882–1936)

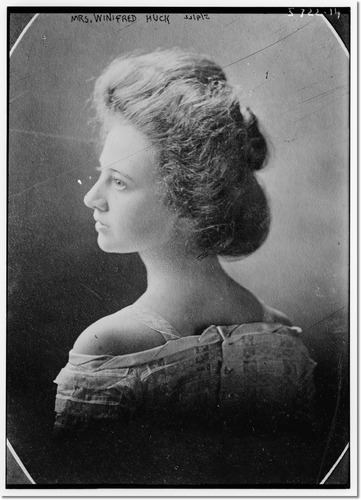

Member of the U.S. House of Representatives from Illinois's at-large district
- In office November 7, 1922 – March 3, 1923
- Preceded by: William E. Mason
- Succeeded by: Henry R. Rathbone

Personal details
- Born: Winnifred Sprague Mason; September 14, 1882 Chicago, Illinois, U.S.
- Died: August 24, 1936 (aged 53) Chicago, Illinois, U.S.
- Resting place: Oakwood Cemetery, Waukegan, Illinois, U.S. 42.3428°N 87.8314°W
- Party: Republican
- Other political affiliations: National Woman's Party
- Spouse: Robert W. Huck
- Relations: William E. Mason (father)
- Children: 4
- Occupation: Investigative journalist

Winnifred Sprague Huck (née Mason; September 14, 1882 – August 24, 1936) was an American journalist and politician from the state of Illinois who became the third woman to serve in the United States Congress, after Jeannette Rankin and Alice Mary Robertson, the first woman to represent Illinois in Congress, the first woman to win a special election for the United States Congress, and the first mother. She was elected to fill the at-large seat of her father, Representative William Ernest Mason, after his death.

== Life and career ==
Huck was born Winnifred Sprague Mason in Chicago, Illinois, and attended public schools in Chicago and in Washington, D.C. She worked as her father's secretary.

Huck was elected as a Republican to the 67th United States Congress by special election to fill the vacancy caused by the death of her father. She served a partial term from November 7, 1922, to March 3, 1923, a term which overlapped with the one-day term of the first woman in the U.S. Senate Rebecca Felton. Unlike most first-term Representatives, she introduced several bills.

She was an unsuccessful candidate for renomination to the 68th Congress in 1922, and an unsuccessful candidate for nomination for a special election (February 27, 1923) to fill the vacancy caused by the death of Representative James Mann. After her term she joined the National Woman's Party.

She later became an investigative journalist, and exposed abuses in the prison system.

Huck died in Chicago, and her ashes were interred in Oakwood Cemetery, in Waukegan, Illinois.

== Gallery ==
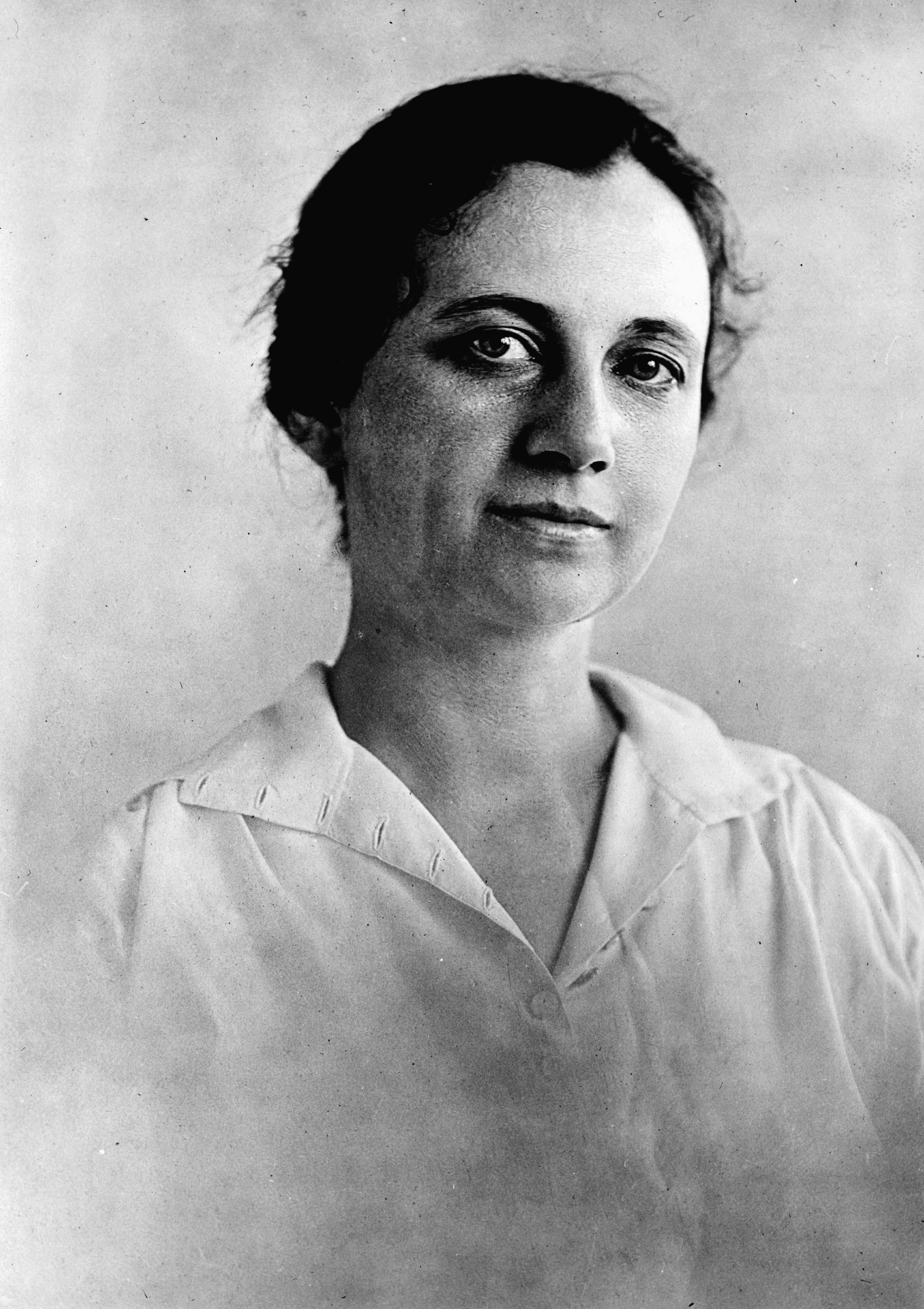
Huck in 1921

== See also ==
- History of the United States Republican Party
- Women in the United States House of Representatives

U.S. House of Representatives
Preceded by William E. Mason	Member of the U.S. House of Representatives from Illinois's at-large congressional district November 7, 1922 – March 3, 1923	Succeeded by Henry Riggs Rathbone
