= 1861 United States Senate election in New York =

- February 5, 1861

Majority vote of each house needed to win
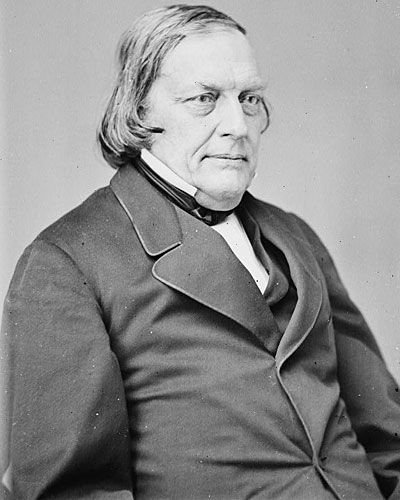

Nominee	Ira Harris	Horatio Seymour
Party	Republican	Democratic
Senate	22	9
Percentage	68.75%	28.13%
House	88	31
Percentage	68.75%	24.22%
Senator before election
William Seward
Republican
Elected Senator
Ira Harris
Republican

The 1861 United States Senate election in New York was held on February 5, 1861, by the New York State Legislature to elect a U.S. senator (Class 3) to represent the State of New York in the United States Senate.

== Background ==
Whig William H. Seward had been re-elected in February 1855 to this seat, had become a Republican upon the foundation of that party in September 1855, and his term would expire on March 3, 1861. Seward did not seek re-election, instead being certain to be appointed to an office in the incoming Abraham Lincoln administration.

The election was held amid the ongoing secession crisis, as much of the South had already seceded in anticipation of the impending inauguration of President Lincoln.

=== Legislative composition ===
At the 1859 state election, 23 Republicans and 9 Democrats were elected for a two-year term in the State Senate. At the 1860 election, 93 Republicans and 35 Democrats were elected to the Assembly for the session of 1861. The 84th New York State Legislature met from January 1 to April 16, 1861, at Albany, New York.

Thus, Republicans were assured of electing the next Senator unless the party split.

== Republican caucus ==
=== Candidates ===
- William Evarts, New York City attorney
- Horace Greeley, editor of the New-York Tribune and former U.S. Representative
- Ira Harris, judge of the New York Supreme Court and former Assemblyman

Though Seward was no longer a factor in the election, his political patron Thurlow Weed expected to control the outcome. His preferred candidate was William Evarts, a leading member of the New York City bar who had chaired the New York delegation at the 1860 Republican National Convention. However, Evarts was opposed by Horace Greeley, the influential editor of the New York Tribune who had joined Weed and Seward to control the Whig and Republican parties in the state for the past several years. A third candidate in the race, Ira Harris, held himself out at Weed's disposal in case Evarts could not be elected.

=== Caucus results ===
After weeks of canvassing, formal ballots were held in which Greeley and Evarts exchanged the lead as Harris slipped behind. On the ninth ballot, when it appeared Greeley would win the nomination (and thus the election), Weed ordered the Evarts men to vote for Harris.

Greeley fell short of a majority on the ninth ballot, and on the tenth, Harris was nominated.

== Election ==
Both in the Assembly and the Senate a strict party vote confirmed the caucus selections.

In the Assembly 119 votes were given. Republicans Smith Anthony (Cayuga Co.), Martin Finch (Essex Co.), Henry A. Prendergast (Chautauqua Co.), Victor M. Rice (Erie Co.) and Perez H. Field (Ontario Co.); and Democrats Luke F. Cozans (NYC), Benjamin H. Long (Erie Co.), N. Holmes Odell (Westchester Co.) and Christian B. Woodruff (NYC); did not vote.

In the State Senate, 31 votes were given. William H. Ferry (Rep., 19th D.) was absent.

== Result ==
Ira Harris was the choice of both the Assembly and the Senate, and was declared elected.

1861 United States Senator election result
Office	House	Republican		Democrat	
U.S. Senator	State Senate (32 members)	Ira Harris	22	Horatio Seymour	9
	State Assembly (128 members)	Ira Harris	88	Horatio Seymour	31

== Aftermath ==
Harris served one term, and remained in office until March 3, 1867.

== Sources ==
- The New York Civil List compiled by Franklin Benjamin Hough, Stephen C. Hutchins and Edgar Albert Werner, 1867 (see pg. 568 for U. S. Senators; pg. 442 for State Senators 1861; pg. 492ff for Members of Assembly 1861)
- Members of the 37th United States Congress
- Result state election 1859 in The Tribune Almanac for 1860 compiled by Horace Greeley of the New York Tribune
- Result state election 1860 in The Tribune Almanac for 1861 compiled by Horace Greeley of the New York Tribune
- FROM THE STATE CAPITAL.; Election of United States Senator in NYT on February 6, 1861
- Result, State Senate: Journal of the Senate (84th Session) (1861; pg. 137)
- Result, Assembly: Journal of the Assembly (84th Session) (1861; pg. 247f)

== See also ==
- United States Senate elections, 1860 and 1861
