= Clara Harris =

American socialite (1834–1883)

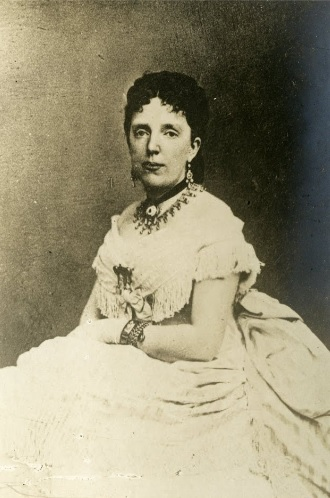
- Born: Clara Hamilton Harris; September 9, 1834; Albany, New York, U.S.
- Died: December 24, 1883 (aged 49); Hildesheim, Kingdom of Prussia, German Empire
- Cause of death: Gunshot wound to the head
- Resting place: Stadtfriedhof Engesohde (disinterred in 1952)
- Spouse: Henry Rathbone (m. 1867)
- Children: Henry Riggs Rathbone; Gerald Lawrence Rathbone; Clara Pauline Rathbone
- Parent(s): Ira Harris; Louisa Tubbs Harris

Clara Hamilton Harris (September 9, 1834 – December 24, 1883) was an American socialite. She and her then-fiancé, and future husband, Henry Rathbone, were the guests of President Abraham Lincoln on the night he was shot at Ford's Theatre. Rathbone's mental state deteriorated after the assassination, and in 1883, he murdered Harris.

== Early life and family ==
Harris was born in Albany, New York, one of four children of U.S. Senator Ira Harris of New York, and his second wife Louisa Harris (née Tubbs). Harris' mother Louisa died in 1845. On August 1, 1848, Ira Harris married Pauline Rathbone (née Penney), the widow of Jared L. Rathbone, a successful merchant who later became the mayor of Albany. Jared and Pauline Rathbone had four children (two of whom, Anna and Charles, died in infancy) including sons, Jared Jr. and Henry.

Although Harris and Henry Rathbone were raised in the same household and were stepsiblings through their parents' marriage, they fell in love and later became engaged. Their engagement was interrupted when the American Civil War broke out in 1861 and Henry Rathbone joined the Union Army that year and became major in 1869 upon joining the 5th United States Infantry.

== Lincoln assassination ==
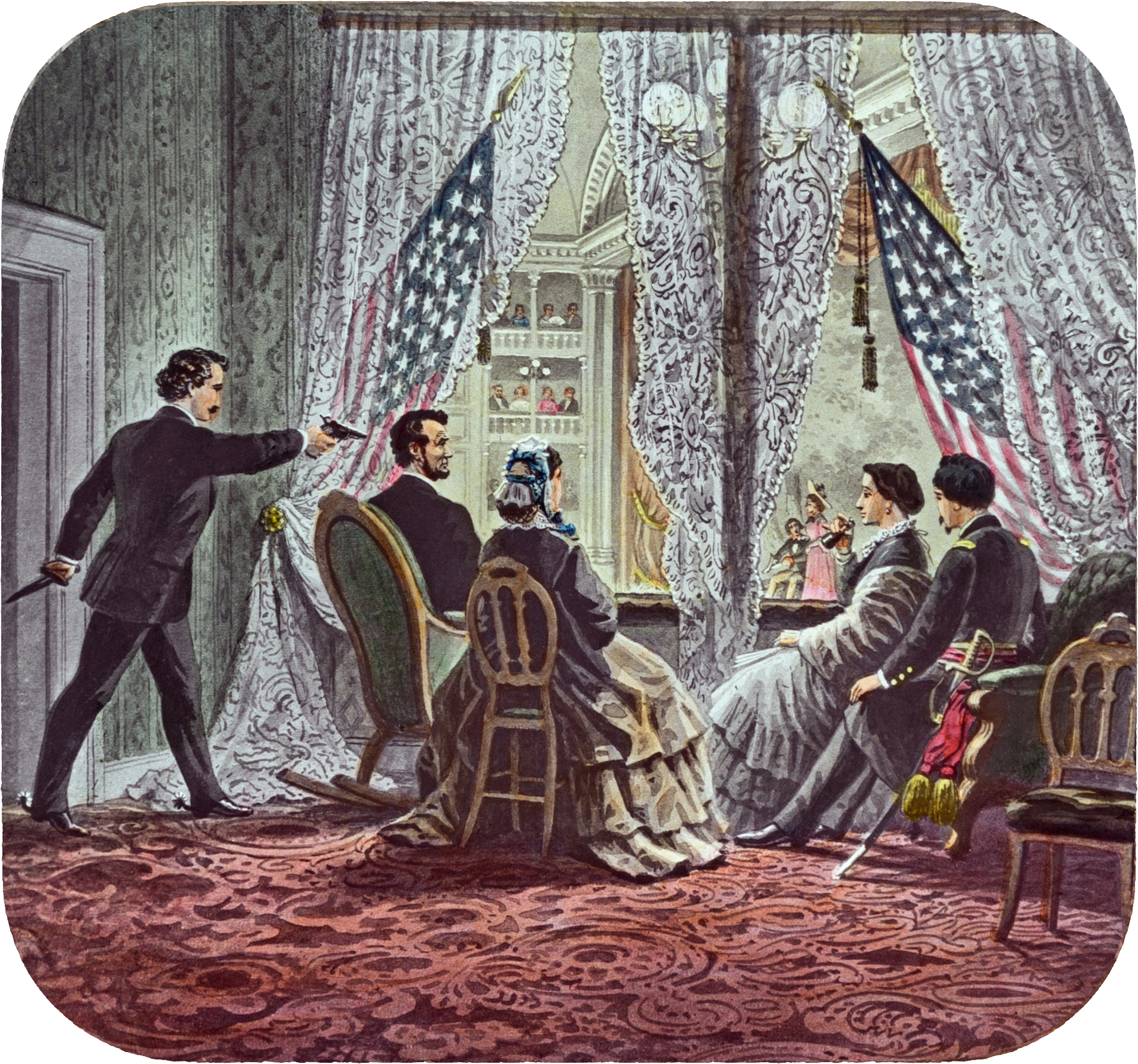
Shown in the presidential booth of Ford's Theatre, from left to right, are assassin John Wilkes Booth, Abraham Lincoln, Mary Todd Lincoln, Clara Harris, and Henry Rathbone

On April 14, 1865, Rathbone and Harris accepted an invitation to see a play at Ford's Theatre from President Abraham Lincoln and his wife, First Lady Mary Todd Lincoln. The couple, who had been friends with the President and his wife for some time, were invited after Ulysses S. Grant and his wife Julia, Thomas Eckert and several other people had declined Mrs. Lincoln's invitation to the play.

While they watched the play Our American Cousin in the Presidential Box at Ford's Theatre that evening, John Wilkes Booth shot President Lincoln in the back of the head, and stabbed Rathbone as Rathbone came at him. Rathbone lost a considerable amount of blood which stained Harris' white dress, face and hands when she attempted to aid him.

Despite his wounds, Rathbone escorted Mary Lincoln to the Petersen House, where doctors had taken the unconscious Lincoln; Rathbone soon after passed out from loss of blood. Harris arrived at the house soon after and held Rathbone's head in her lap while he drifted in and out of consciousness. Surgeons now realized that Booth had severed an artery just above Rathbone's elbow, cutting him nearly to the bone. He was taken home while Harris stayed with Mary Lincoln. Harris later wrote:

Poor Mrs. Lincoln, all through that dreadful night would look at me with horror & scream, "Oh! my husband's blood, my dear husband's blood

It was Henry's blood, not the president's.

Lincoln died the following morning. Although Rathbone recovered, he blamed himself for Lincoln's death, and spent the remainder of his life battling delusions and physical symptoms including constant headaches.

Harris kept the bloodied white dress she had been wearing on the night of the assassination. Unable to bring herself to wash or destroy it, she eventually stored it in a closet in the family's summer home near Albany. After what she believed to be a visit from Lincoln's ghost, she had the closet bricked up. In 1910, her son reopened the closet and had the dress destroyed, claiming it was a curse on the family.

== Later life and death ==
Harris and Rathbone were married on July 11, 1867. The couple had three children: Henry Riggs (born February 12, 1870), who later became a U.S. Congressman from Illinois, Gerald Lawrence (born August 26, 1871) and Clara Pauline (born September 15, 1872). Rathbone, who had risen to the rank of colonel, resigned from the Army in December 1870. The family settled in Washington D.C., where Rathbone's mental health deteriorated. Rathbone's behavior became increasingly erratic and he began drinking heavily, gambling and having affairs. Due to his behavior, Rathbone found it difficult to hold a job for an extended period of time.

Every year on the anniversary of Lincoln's assassination, journalists would contact the couple with questions about Lincoln's death, furthering Rathbone's feelings of guilt. Harris later wrote to a friend:

I understand his distress...in every hotel we're in, as soon as people get wind of our presence, we feel ourselves become objects of morbid scrutiny.... Whenever we were in the dining room, we began to feel like zoo animals. Henry...imagines that the whispering is more pointed and malicious than it can possibly be.

As time went on, Rathbone's mental instability worsened and he often became jealous of other men who paid attention to Harris and resented the attention Harris paid their children. He also reportedly threatened his wife on several occasions, convinced that Harris was going to divorce him and take the children. Despite his behavior, Rathbone was appointed U.S. Consul to the Province of Hanover by President Chester A. Arthur in 1882. The family relocated to Germany where Rathbone's mental health continued to decline.

On December 24, 1883, Rathbone attacked his family in a fit of madness. He fatally shot his wife in the head and then attempted to kill the children, but a groundskeeper prevented him from doing so. Rathbone then stabbed himself five times in the chest in an attempted suicide. Blaming his crime on an intruder, Rathbone was charged with murder and declared insane by doctors. He was convicted and committed to an asylum for the criminally insane in Hildesheim, Germany, where he died on August 14, 1911. The couple's children were sent to live with their uncle, William Harris, in the United States.

Harris was buried in the city cemetery at Hanover/Engesohde. Her husband was buried next to her upon his death in 1911. In 1952, the Rathbones' remains were disinterred and their remains disposed of in accordance with the German cemetery's policies, i.e. the couple's surviving family lived overseas and could not regularly tend their graves.

== Portrayals ==
- The dress Harris wore the night Lincoln was shot was the subject of the 1929 book The White Satin Dress, by Mary Raymond Shipman Andrews.
- In 1994, Thomas Mallon released the novel Henry and Clara, a fictional account of the lives of Harris and her husband.
- Mercedes Herrero (1998) The Day Lincoln Was Shot
- Eleanor Perkinson (2013) Killing Lincoln
- Carrie Anne Hunt (2024) Manhunt
