= Henry Rathbone =

US military officer and diplomat (1837–1911)

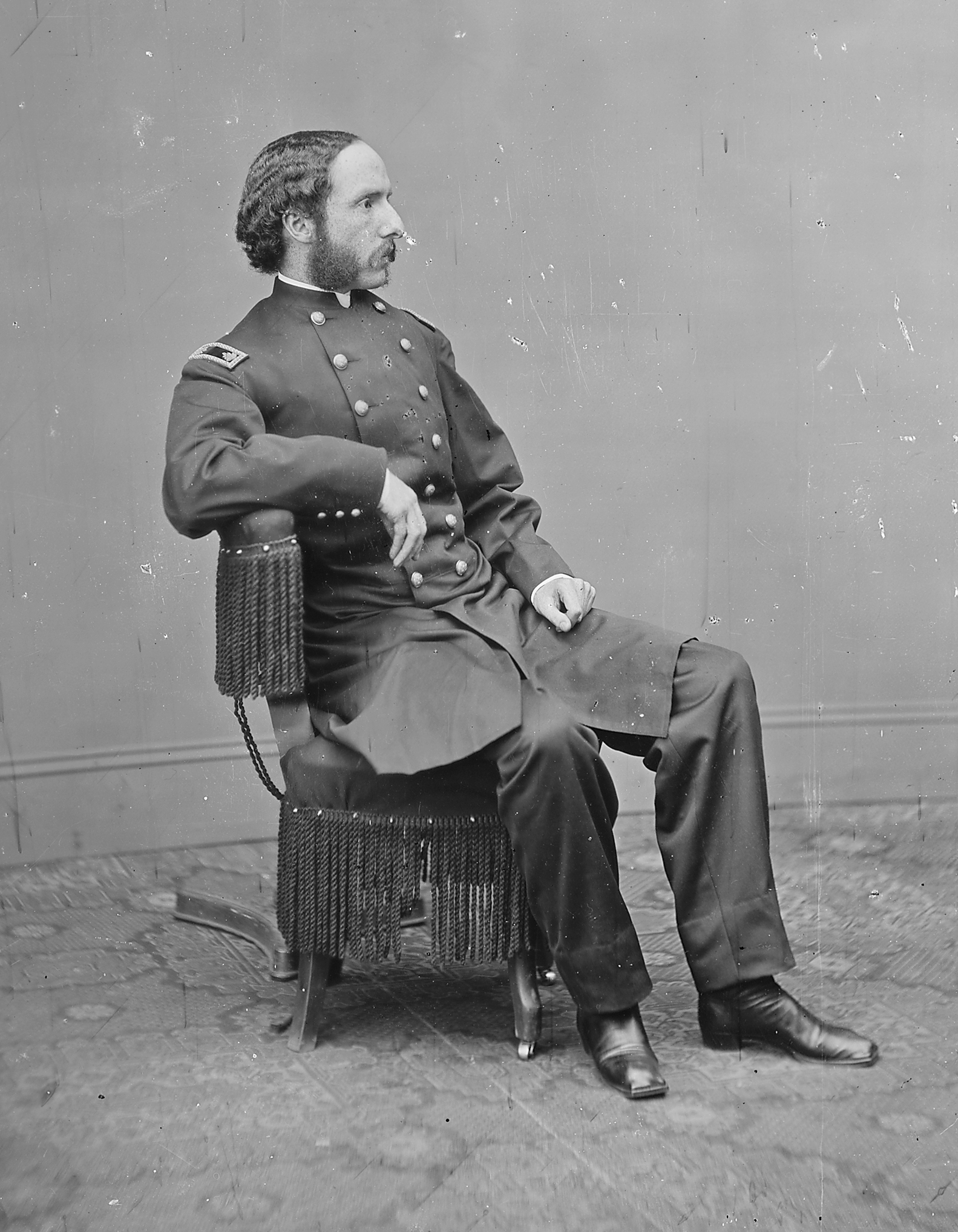
- 1865 Mathew Brady photograph of Rathbone
- Born: Henry Reed Rathbone; July 1, 1837; Albany, New York, U.S.
- Died: August 14, 1911 (aged 74); Hildesheim, Kingdom of Prussia, German Empire
- Burial place: Stadtfriedhof Engesohde (disinterred in 1952)
- Spouse: Clara Harris (m. 1867; died 1883)
- Children: Henry Riggs Rathbone; Gerald Lawrence Rathbone; Clara Pauline Rathbone
- Relatives: Ira Harris (stepfather and father-in-law)
- Military career
- Allegiance: United States (Union)
- Branch: U.S. Army (Union Army)
- Service years: 1861–1870
- Rank: Brevet colonel
- Unit: 12th U.S. Infantry
- Conflicts: American Civil War; Battle of Antietam; Battle of Fredericksburg; Battle of the Crater
- Other work: Attorney

Henry Reed Rathbone (July 1, 1837 – August 14, 1911) was an American military officer and lawyer who was present at the assassination of President Abraham Lincoln; Rathbone and his fiancée Clara Harris were sitting with Lincoln and Lincoln's wife Mary Todd Lincoln when the president was shot by John Wilkes Booth at Ford's Theatre on April 14, 1865.

When Rathbone attempted to apprehend Booth, Booth stabbed and seriously wounded him. Rathbone may have played a part in Booth's leg injury. His mental state deteriorated afterwards, and in 1883, he killed his wife, Clara; he was declared insane and lived the rest of his life in a lunatic asylum.

== Early life and family ==
Rathbone was born in Albany, New York, one of four children of Jared L. Rathbone, a merchant and wealthy businessman, who later became the first elected Mayor of Albany, and Pauline Rathbone (née Penney). Upon his father's death in 1845, Rathbone inherited $200,000 (equivalent to $8 million in 2025). His widowed mother married Ira Harris in 1848. Harris was later appointed U.S. Senator from New York after William H. Seward became Abraham Lincoln's secretary of state in 1861.

As a result of the marriage, Ira Harris became Rathbone's stepfather. Harris was a widower with four children of his own, including a daughter named Clara, who became Rathbone's stepsister when the two were approximately ages 11 and 14. Despite being step-siblings, they formed a close friendship and later fell in love, becoming engaged shortly before the American Civil War.

The couple married on July 11, 1867, and had three children: Henry Riggs (born February 12, 1870), who later became a U.S. Congressman; Gerald Lawrence (born August 26, 1871); and Clara Pauline (born September 15, 1872).

== Legal and military career ==
Rathbone studied law at Union College, where he was known to miss many classes, and worked in a law partnership in Albany. In 1858, he entered the New York National Guard, where he worked as a judge advocate. Shortly after this, he was selected to be sent to Europe as an observer during the Second Italian War for Independence.

He entered the Union Army at the start of the American Civil War and served as a captain in the 12th Infantry Regiment at the Battle of Antietam and the Battle of Fredericksburg. In 1863, he was pulled from frontline duty and given a desk job. By the war's end, he had attained the rank of major. When he resigned from the military in 1870, Rathbone had risen to the rank of brevet colonel.

== Lincoln assassination ==
On April 14, 1865, Rathbone and Harris accepted an invitation from President Lincoln and First Lady Mary Todd Lincoln to see a play at Ford's Theatre. Rathbone and Harris had been friends with the president and his wife for some time and were invited after Ulysses S. Grant and his wife, Julia, and several others had declined the invitation.

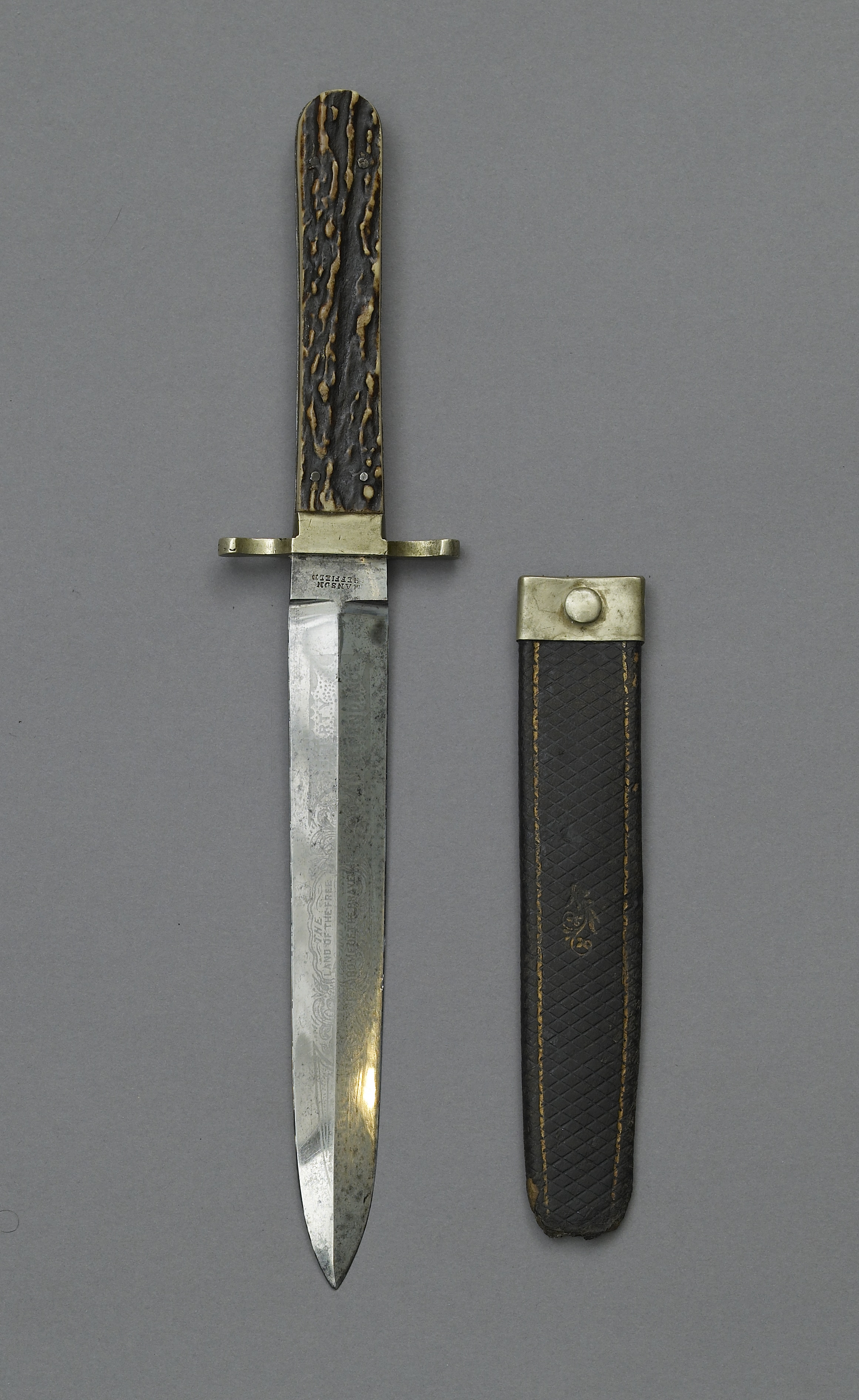
The dagger used by Booth to attack Rathbone.

During the play, noted stage actor John Wilkes Booth entered the presidential box and shot President Lincoln in the back of the head with a pistol. Rathbone heard the shot and turned to see Booth standing in gunsmoke less than four feet behind Lincoln; Booth shouted something that Rathbone thought was "Freedom!" Rathbone immediately leapt from his seat and grabbed Booth. Rathbone was horrified at the anger on Booth's face, as Booth wrestled himself away, dropped the pistol and drew a dagger, and attempted to stab Rathbone in the chest. Rathbone parried the blow by raising his arms and Booth slashed Rathbone's left arm from the elbow to his shoulder.

Although wounded, Rathbone recovered and grabbed onto Booth's coat, as Booth prepared to jump from the box, causing Booth to lose balance as he leapt to the stage, possibly breaking his leg, though some historians have suggested that the injury occurred later. As Booth landed on the stage, Rathbone cried out, "Stop that man!" Audience member Joseph B. Stewart climbed over the orchestra pit and footlights and pursued Booth across the stage, repeating Rathbone's cry of "Stop that man!" several times. Booth escaped and remained at large for twelve days.

Rathbone assessed the President as unconscious and mortally wounded. He rushed to the door of the box for the purpose of calling medical aid. Rathbone testified that it was "barred by a heavy piece of plank, one end of which was secured in the wall, and the other resting against the door. It had been so securely fastened that it required considerable force to remove it. This wedge or bar was about four feet from the floor. Persons upon the outside were beating against the door for the purpose of entering. I removed the bar, and the door was opened. Several persons, who represented themselves as surgeons, were allowed to enter. I saw there Colonel Crawford, and requested him to prevent other persons from entering the box. I then returned to the box, and found the surgeons examining the President's person. They had not yet discovered the wound. As soon as it was discovered, it was determined to remove him from the theater."

As Lincoln was carried out, Rathbone escorted Mary Lincoln to the Petersen House across the street, where the president was taken. Rathbone said that upon "reaching the head of the stairs, I requested Major Potter to aid me in assisting Mrs. Lincoln across the street to the house where the President was being conveyed."

Shortly thereafter, Rathbone passed out due to blood loss. Harris arrived soon after and held Rathbone's head in her lap while he lay semiconscious. When surgeon Charles Leale, who had been attending Lincoln, finally examined Rathbone, it was realized that his wound was more serious than initially thought. Booth had cut him nearly to the bone and severed an artery. Rathbone was taken home. Harris remained with Mary Lincoln as the president lay in a comatose state over the next nine hours before he died on the morning of April 15.

== Later life and death ==
Although Rathbone's physical wounds healed, his mental state deteriorated in the years following Lincoln's death as he anguished over his perceived inability to thwart the assassination.

After his resignation from the military in 1870, Rathbone struggled to find and keep a job due to his mental instability. He became convinced that Harris was unfaithful and resented the attention she paid their children. He reportedly threatened her on several occasions after suspecting that she was going to divorce him and take the children. During this time, he made multiple unsuccessful attempts to obtain a position as a United States consul, before eventually being offered the appointment as Consul to Hanover by President Chester A. Arthur.

Rathbone and his family relocated to Germany, where his mental health continued to decline. On December 23, 1883, he attacked his children in a fit of madness. He fatally shot and stabbed his wife, who was attempting to protect the children. He stabbed himself five times in the chest in an attempted suicide. He was charged with murder, but was declared insane by doctors after he blamed the murder on an intruder. He was convicted and committed to an asylum for the criminally insane in Hildesheim, Germany. The couple's children were sent to live with their uncle, William Harris, in the United States.

Rathbone spent the rest of his life in the asylum. On August 31, 1910, it was reported that he was "near death". He died on August 14, 1911, and was buried next to his wife at the Stadtfriedhof Engesohde cemetery in Hanover. In 1952, the Rathbones' remains were disinterred and their remains disposed of in accordance with the German cemetery's policies, i.e. the couple's surviving family lived overseas and could not regularly tend their graves.

== Portrayals ==
- Earl Schenck (1924) The Dramatic Life of Abraham Lincoln
- Lloyd Whitlock (1936) The Prisoner of Shark Island
- Steve Darrell (1955) Prince of Players
- John Cooler (1977) The Lincoln Conspiracy
- Sean Baldwin (1998) The Day Lincoln Was Shot
- Andy Martin (2010) The Conspirator
- Joseph Carlson (2013) Killing Lincoln
- Larry David (2026) Life, Larry and the Pursuit of Unhappiness

His experience at the Lincoln assassination and the murder of Clara Harris are covered in the non-fiction book Worst Seat in the House: Henry Rathbone's Front Row View of the Lincoln Assassination by Caleb Stephens.

Rathbone and Harris are also the subjects of Henry and Clara, a 1994 historical fiction novel by Thomas Mallon.
