= Ford's Theatre =

Theater in Washington, D.C.

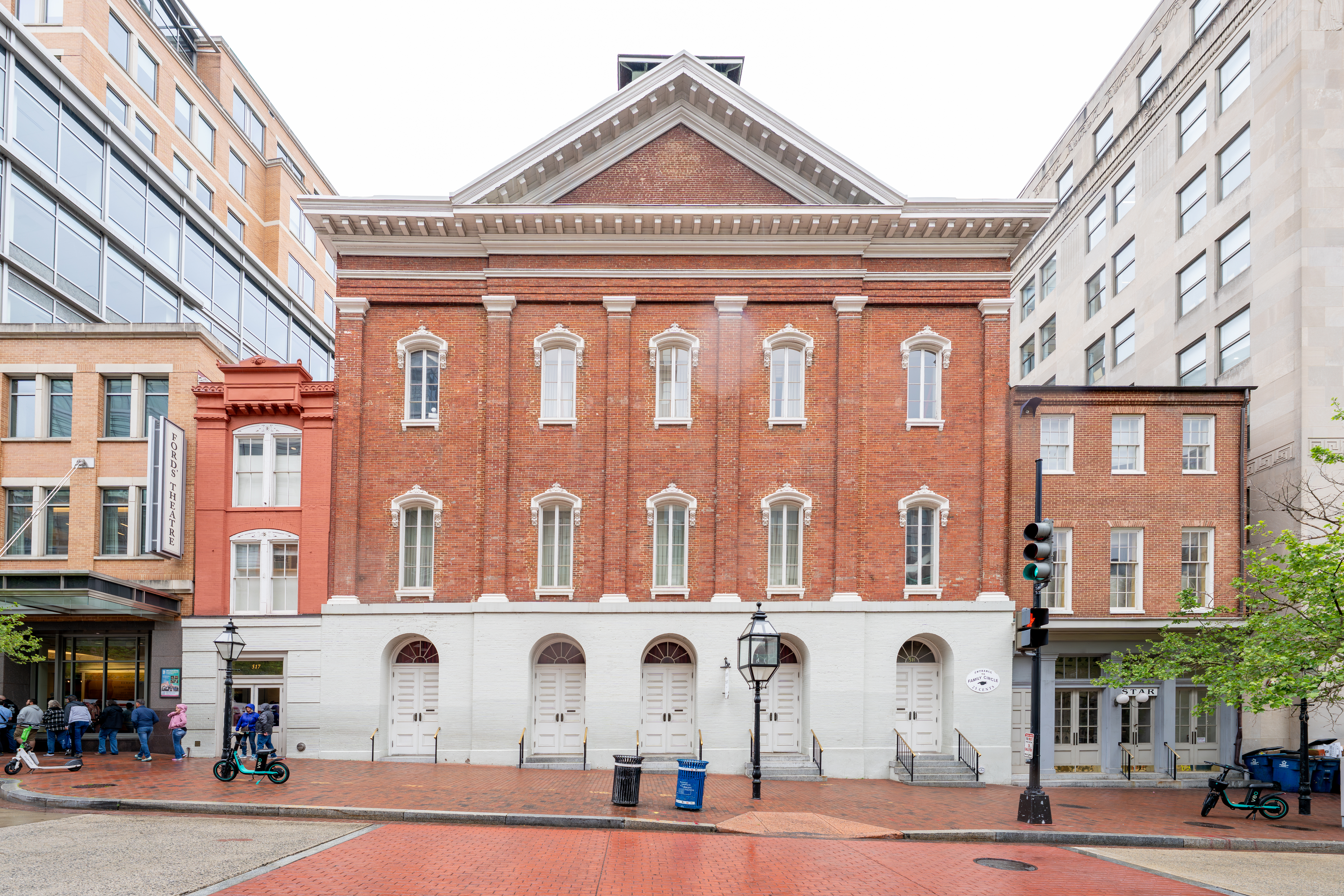
- The building in 2026

- Location within Central Washington, D.C. Location within the District of Columbia Location within the United States
- Address: 511 10th St, N.W. Washington, D.C. United States
- Coordinates: 38°53′48″N 77°1′33″W
- Owner: National Park Service
- Operator: Ford's Theatre Society
- Capacity: 665
- Type: Regional theater

Construction
- Opened: August 1863; 163 years ago
- Reopened: 1968, 2009

Website
- www.fords.org

U.S. National Register of Historic Places
- Type: National Historic Site
- Designated: October 15, 1966
- Reference no.: 66000034

D.C. Inventory of Historic Sites
- Designated: November 8, 1964
- Reference no.: 205

Ford's Theatre is a theater in Washington, D.C., which opened in 1863. In 1865, it was the site of the assassination of Abraham Lincoln by John Wilkes Booth. The theater was later used as a warehouse and government office building. In 1893, part of its interior flooring collapsed, causing 22 deaths, and needed repairs were made. The building became a museum in 1932, and it was renovated and re-opened as a theater in 1968. A related Center for Education and Leadership museum opened in 2012, next to Petersen House.

The Petersen House and the theater are preserved together as Ford's Theatre National Historic Site, administered by the National Park Service. Programming within the theater and the Center for Education is overseen separately by the Ford's Theatre Society.

== History ==
The site was originally a house of worship, constructed in 1833 as the second meeting house of the First Baptist Church of Washington, with Obadiah Bruen Brown as the pastor. In 1861, after the congregation moved to a newly built structure, John T. Ford bought the former church and renovated it into a theater. He first called it Ford's Athenaeum. It was destroyed by fire in 1862 and was rebuilt.

=== Assassination of Abraham Lincoln ===
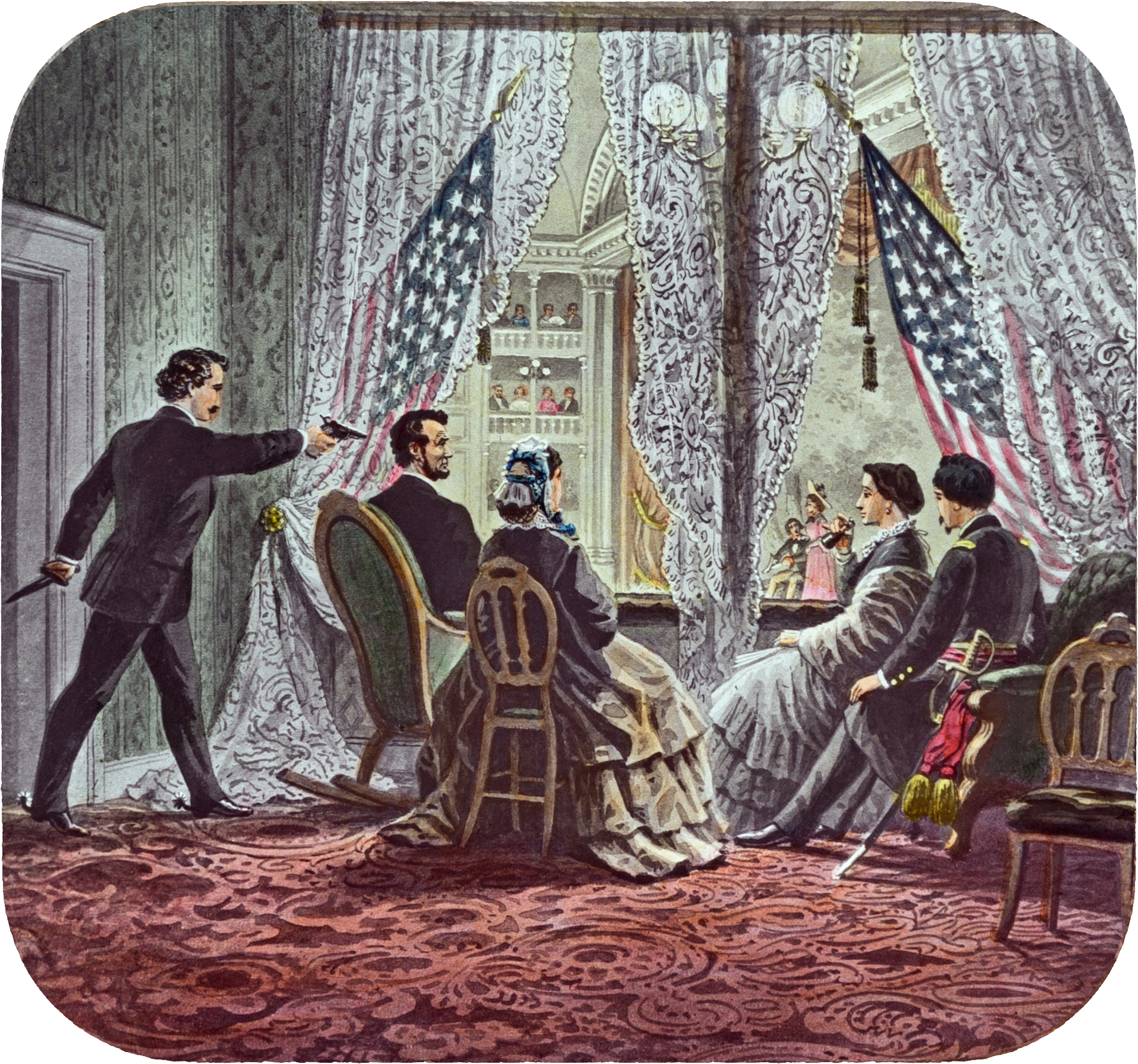
A depiction of the assassination of Abraham Lincoln, showing Booth, Lincoln, Mary Todd Lincoln, Clara Harris, and Henry Rathbone

On April 14, 1865, five days after General Lee's surrender at Appomattox Court House, President Abraham Lincoln attended a performance of Tom Taylor's play Our American Cousin at Ford's Theatre. John Wilkes Booth entered the presidential box and shot Lincoln in the back of the head with a 5.87-inch derringer, mortally wounding him. Booth stabbed Major Henry Rathbone as Rathbone came at him, then leapt from the box onto the stage and made his escape through the back of the theater, en route stabbing orchestra leader William Withers Jr.

The assassination was witnessed by a theater full of about 1,700 people, possibly including the then 5-year-old Samuel J. Seymour who claimed to be the last living witness to the Lincoln assassination before his death in 1956. An unconscious Lincoln was taken across the street to the nearby Petersen House, where he died the next day.

Following the assassination, the theater was shut down for a criminal investigation which continued until Booth's co-conspirators were executed in July 1865. Once it was in his possession again, Ford announced that the theater would reopen on July 10, 1865, with a performance of The Octoroon; or, Life in Louisiana. It was advertised that "the Theatre is in the same condition as when last opened to the public", and that Ford planned to give some of the proceeds to a fund for the construction of a monument to Lincoln, as he had done at his other theater in Baltimore. However, Ford was met with angry letters and threats. On the night of the reopening, Secretary of War Edwin Stanton had the theater seized again to prevent any incidents and dispersed the crowd waiting to enter.

The next day, Ford was told that the theater had been confiscated permanently. Congress paid Ford $88,000 ($1.85 million in 2025) in compensation, and an order was issued forever prohibiting its use as a place of public amusement. Between 1866 and 1887, the theater was taken over by the U.S. military and served as a facility for the War Department with records kept on the first floor, the Library of the Surgeon General's Office on the second floor, and the Army Medical Museum on the third. In 1887, the building exclusively became a clerk's office for the Record and Pension Office of the War Department when the medical departments moved out.

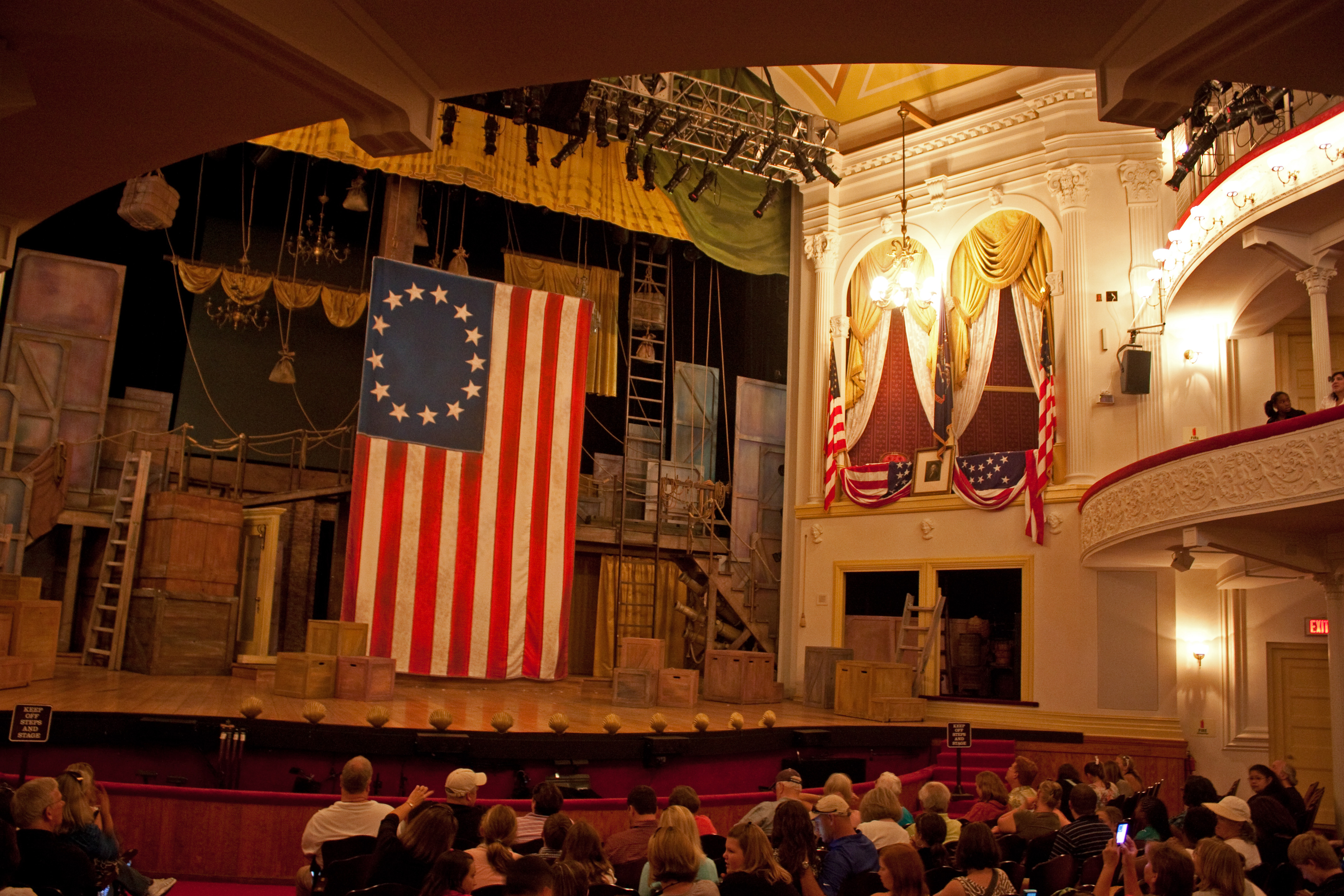
View from beneath the balcony. The Presidential Box is on the right.

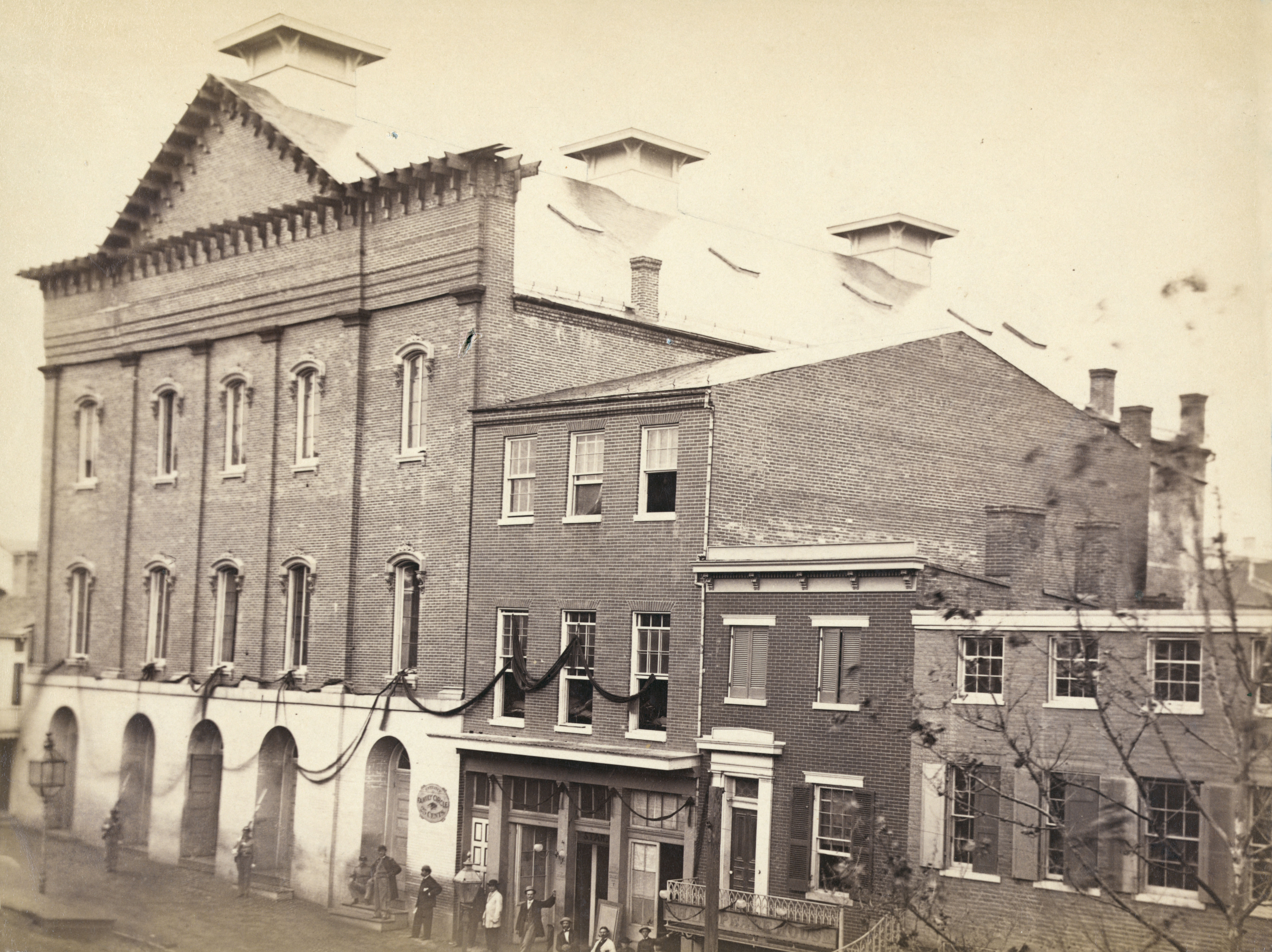
Ford's Theatre in 1865

=== Disrepair and restoration ===
On June 9, 1893, the front section of the three interior floors collapsed when a supporting pillar was undermined during excavation of the cellar, killing 22 clerks and injuring another 68. This led some people to believe that the former church turned theater and storeroom was cursed. The building was repaired and Record and Pension Office clerks were moved back on July 30, 1894.

In 1928, the building was turned over from the War Department Office to the Office of Public Buildings and Parks of the National Capital. A Lincoln museum opened on the first floor of the theater building on February 12, 1932—Lincoln's 123rd birthday. In 1933, the building was transferred to the National Park Service.

The restoration of Ford's Theatre was brought about by the two-decade-long lobbying efforts of Democratic National Committeeman Melvin D. Hildreth and Republican North Dakota Representative Milton Young. Hildreth first suggested to Young the need for its restoration in 1945. Through extensive lobbying of Congress, a bill was passed in 1955 to prepare an engineering study for the reconstruction of the building. In 1964, Congress approved funds for its restoration, which began that year and was completed in 1968.

On January 21, 1968, Vice President Hubert Humphrey and 500 others dedicated the restored theater. The theater reopened on January 30, 1968, with a gala performance. The presidential box is never occupied.

The theater was again renovated during the 2000s. It has a current seating capacity of 665. The reopening ceremony was on February 11, 2009, which commemorated Lincoln's 200th birthday. The event featured remarks from President Barack Obama as well as appearances by Katie Couric, Kelsey Grammer, James Earl Jones, Ben Vereen, Jeffrey Wright, the President's Own Marine Band, Joshua Bell, Patrick Lundy and the Ministers of Music, Audra McDonald and Jessye Norman.

In March of every year, the Abraham Lincoln Institute holds a symposium at Ford's Theatre.

== Ford's Theatre National Historic Site ==
The National Historic Site consisting of two contributing buildings, the theater and the Petersen House, was designated in 1932.

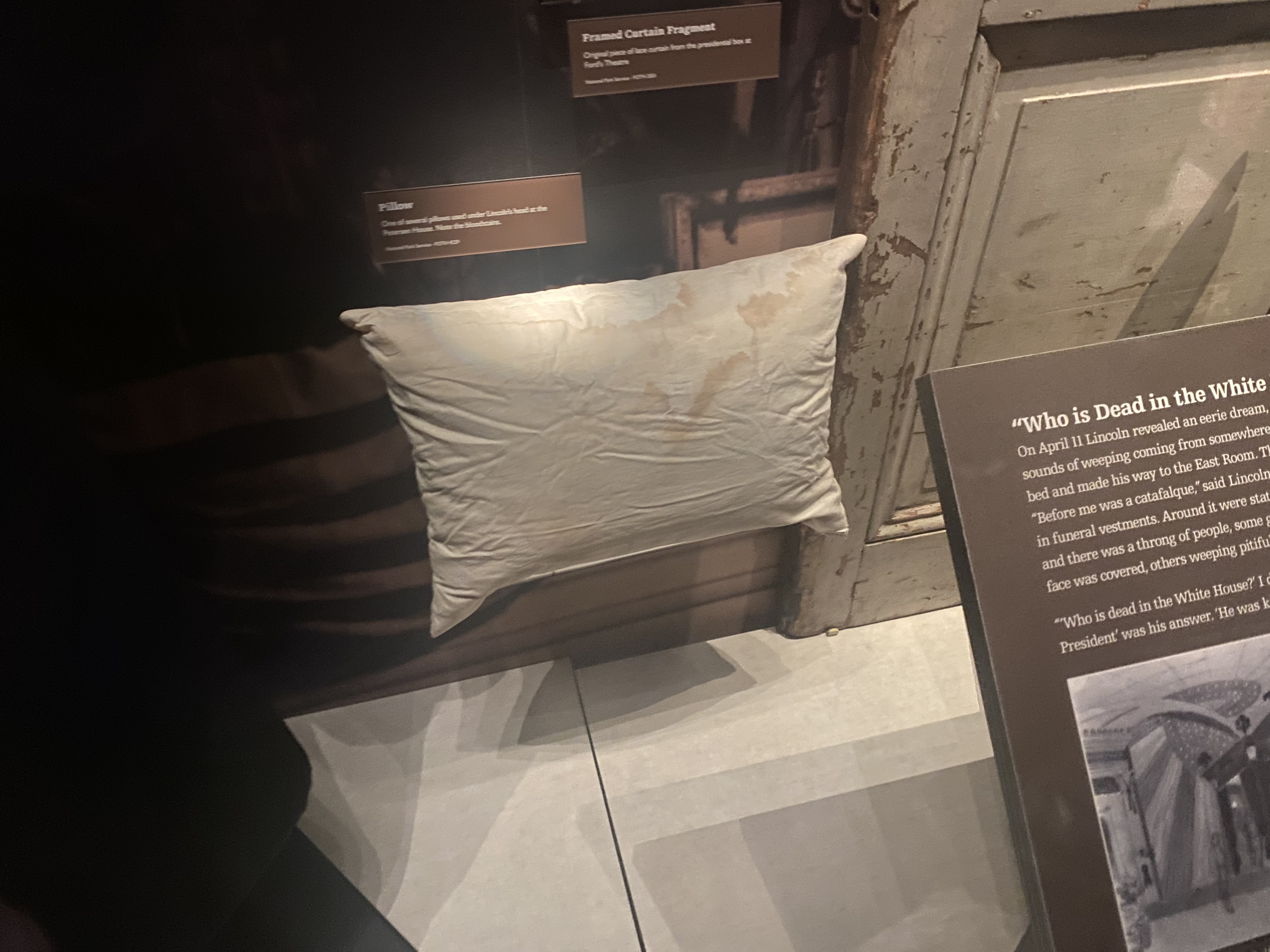
The pillow used under Lincoln's head after his assassination at the Ford Theatre Museum. Blood stains are visible on the top of the pillow.

The Ford's Theatre Museum beneath the theater contains portions of the Olroyd Collection of Lincolniana. Most recently renovated for a July 2009 reopening, the Museum is run through a partnership with the National Park Service and the private non-profit 501(c)(3) organization Ford's Theatre Society. The collection includes multiple items related to the assassination, including the Derringer pistol used to carry out the shooting, Booth's diary and the original door to Lincoln's theater box.

A number of Lincoln's family items, his coat, without the blood-stained pieces, some statues of Lincoln and several large portraits of the President are on display in the museum. The blood-stained pillow from the President's deathbed is in the Ford's Theatre Museum. In addition to covering the assassination conspiracy, the renovated museum focuses on Lincoln's arrival in Washington, his presidential cabinet, family life in the White House and his role as orator and emancipator. The museum also features exhibits about Civil War milestones and generals and about the building's history as a theatrical venue. The rocking chair in which Lincoln was sitting is now on display at The Henry Ford Museum in Dearborn, Michigan.

=== Petersen House ===
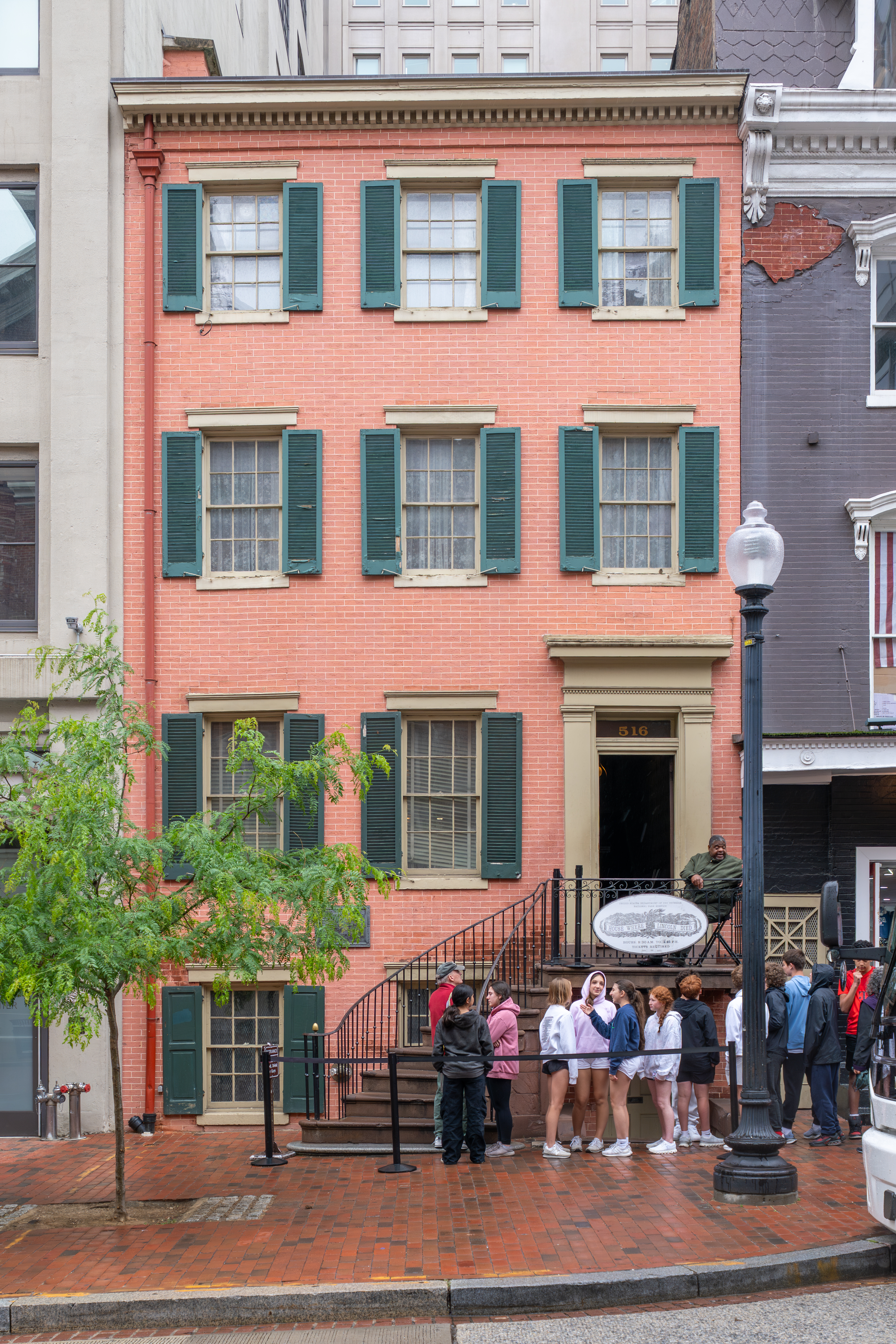
Lincoln died in Petersen House, across from Ford's Theatre.

After Lincoln was shot, doctors had soldiers carry him into the street in search of a house in which he would be more comfortable. A man on the steps of the house of tailor William Petersen beckoned to them. They took Lincoln into the first-floor bedroom and laid him on the bed—diagonally because of his unusual height. Many people came to visit him throughout the night before he died the following morning at 7:22 a.m.

The Petersen House was purchased by the U.S. government in 1896 as the "House Where Lincoln Died", being the federal government's first purchase of a historic home. The National Park Service has operated the building as a historic house museum since 1933, with the rooms being furnished as they were on the day Lincoln died.

== See also ==
- Abraham Lincoln Birthplace National Historic Site
- Abraham Lincoln Presidential Library and Museum
- Lincoln Boyhood National Memorial
- Lincoln Home National Historic Site
- Lincoln Memorial
- Lincoln Memorial University
- Lincoln Tomb
- Mount Rushmore
- National Register of Historic Places listings in central Washington, D.C.
- Theater in Washington, D.C.
- President Lincoln's Cottage
- Presidential memorials in the United States
