= Campbell General Hospital =

Union Civil War Hospital in Washington, D.C.

- Part of military hospitals in the United States
- Washington, D.C.
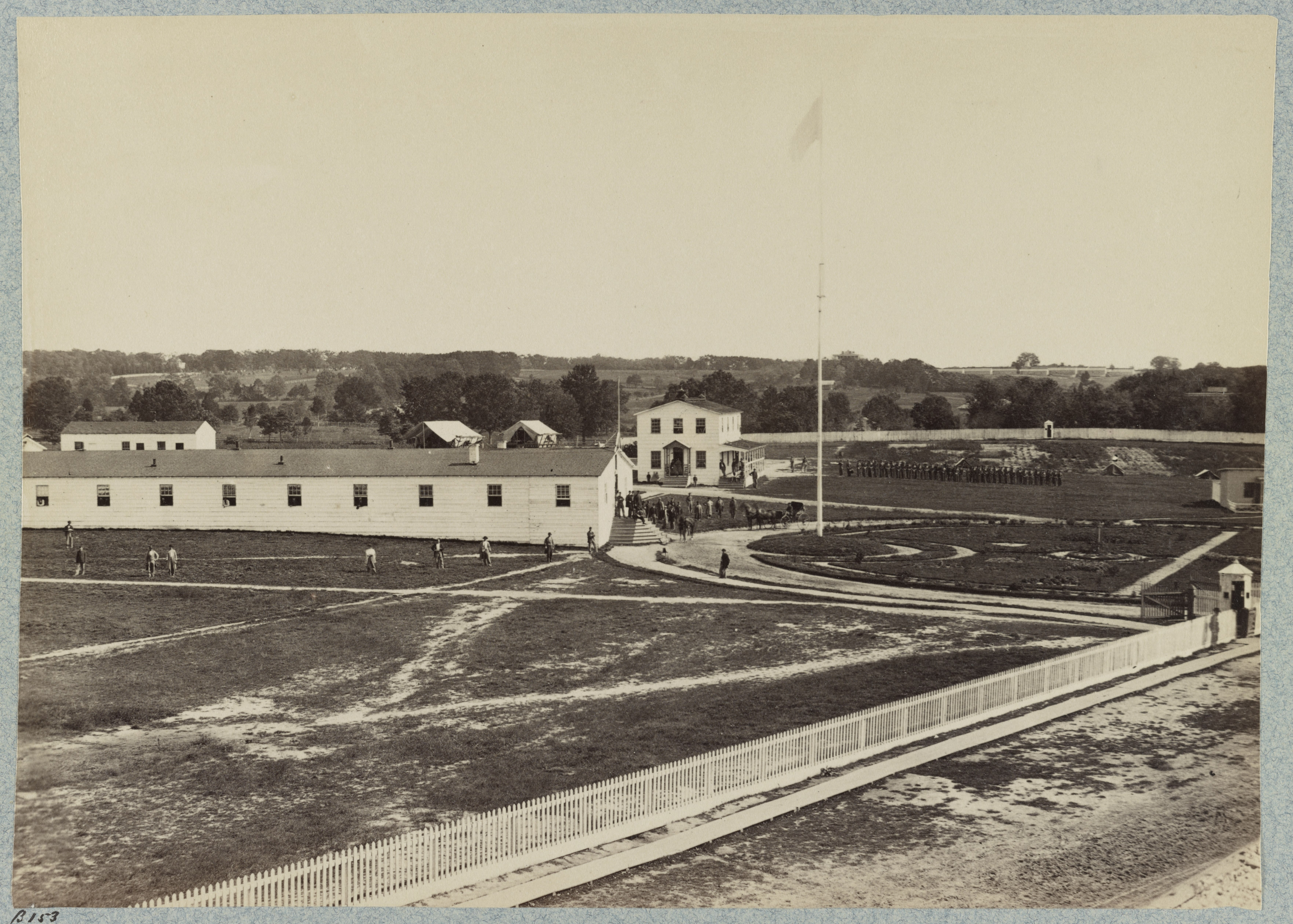
- General view of the hospital

Site information
- Controlled by: Union Army

Location
- Location within Washington, D.C.
- Coordinates: 38.916748°N 77.022436°W

Site history
- Built: 1862
- In use: 1862–1865
- Battles/wars: American Civil War

Campbell General Hospital was a Union Civil War hospital which operated from September 1862 to July 20, 1865, in northwest Washington, D.C.

The hospital was located on Boundary Street NW (now Florida Avenue NW) between 5th Street NW and 6th Street NW.

== History ==
=== Military hospital ===
The hospital was opened in September 1862 but did not receive most of its patients until in December 1862.

The hospital was built with 900 beds. In the Census of the General Hospitals, Department of Washington of December 17, 1864, only 633 beds were occupied.

=== Freedmen's Hospital ===
Freedmen's Hospital moved to the Campbell General Hospital in January 1865 when the one-story building was razed, and later that year it was placed under the Freedmen's Bureau. It had been established in 1862 as Camp Barker by the War Department at 12th Street NW and R Street NW, and was renamed to Freedmen's Hospital in 1863. The old Freedman General Hospital had 72 beds which were full in 1864.

The hospital had a theater offering nightly entertainment to patients. This feature led to the Hospital almost becoming the scene of the abduction of President Lincoln. John Wilkes Booth was informed that President Lincoln would be attending a performance of Still Waters Run Deep on March 17, 1865. He arranged for an ambush in a rush. Upon arriving at the location, a carriage approached, but it was not Abraham Lincoln on board. It could have been Salmon P. Chase, Chief Justice of the United States who attended the show. President Lincoln's schedule had been changed and he was meeting with a group of Indiana soldiers instead. The abduction plot was postponed, changed to assassintion and took place on April 14, 1865, at Ford's Theatre instead.

The hospital was reported empty in July 1865. In 1869, the Freedmen’s Hospital moved to the campus of Howard University.

== Gallery ==
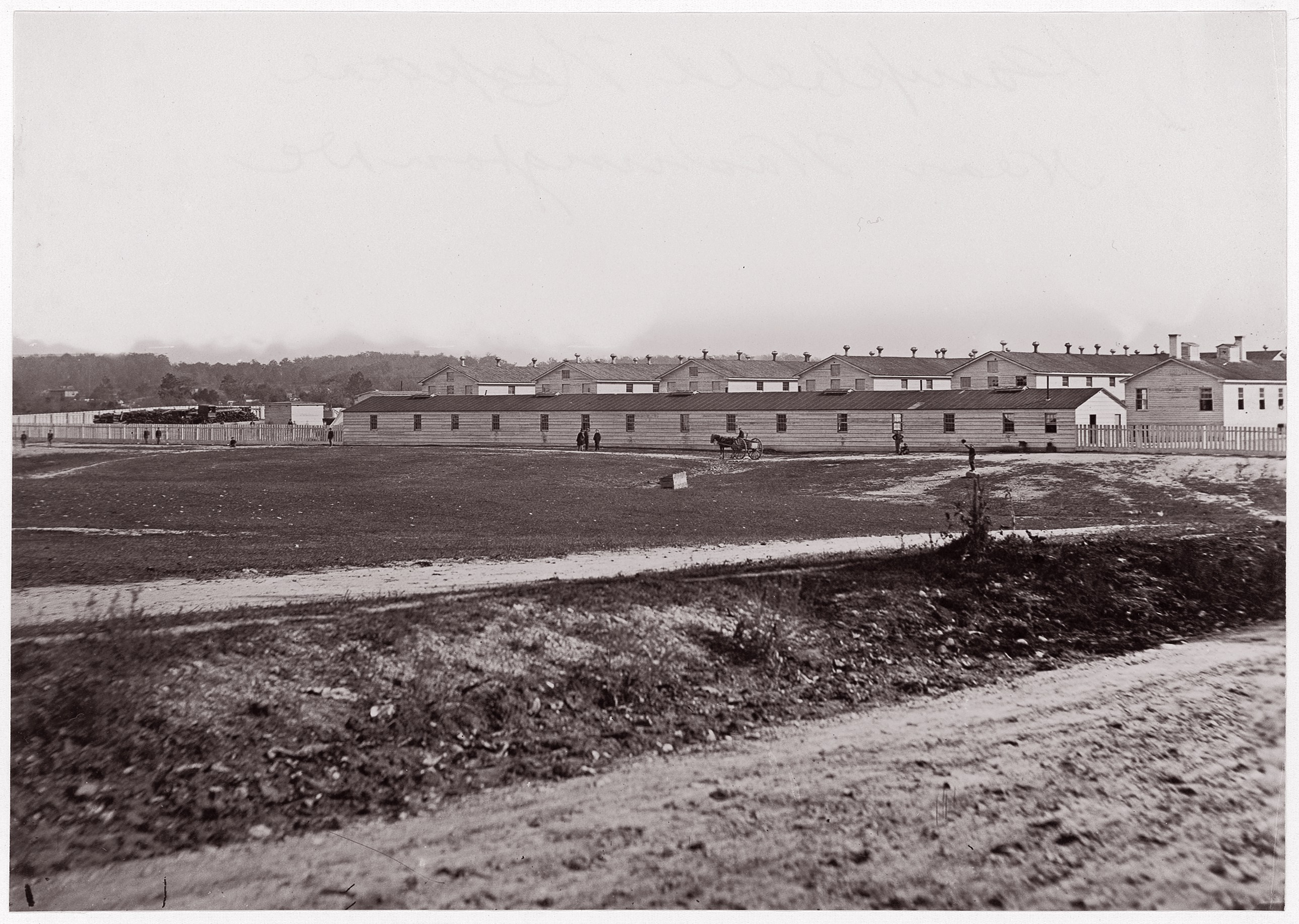
General view of the Campbell Hospital during the Civil War

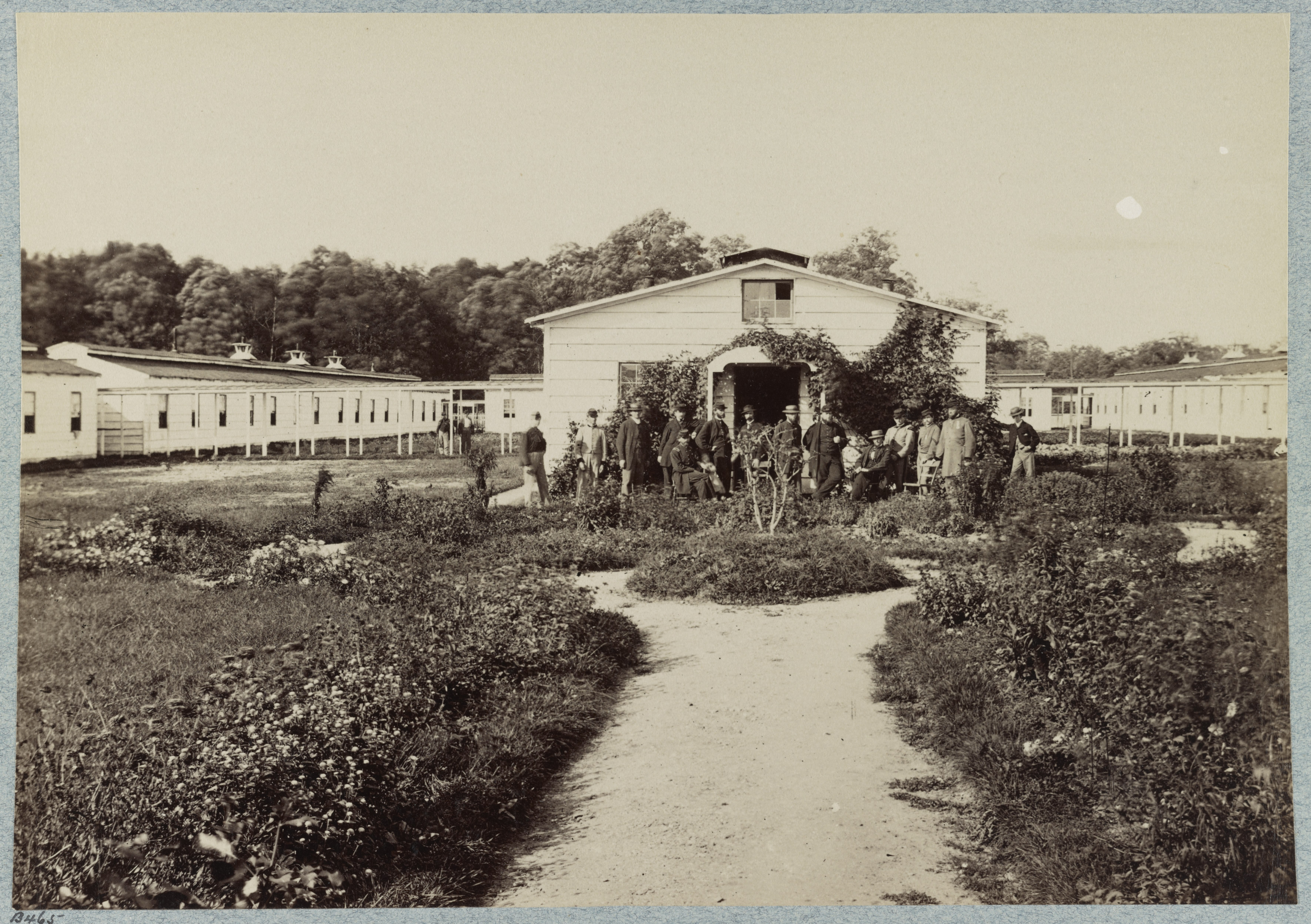
The Garden at Campbell Hospital

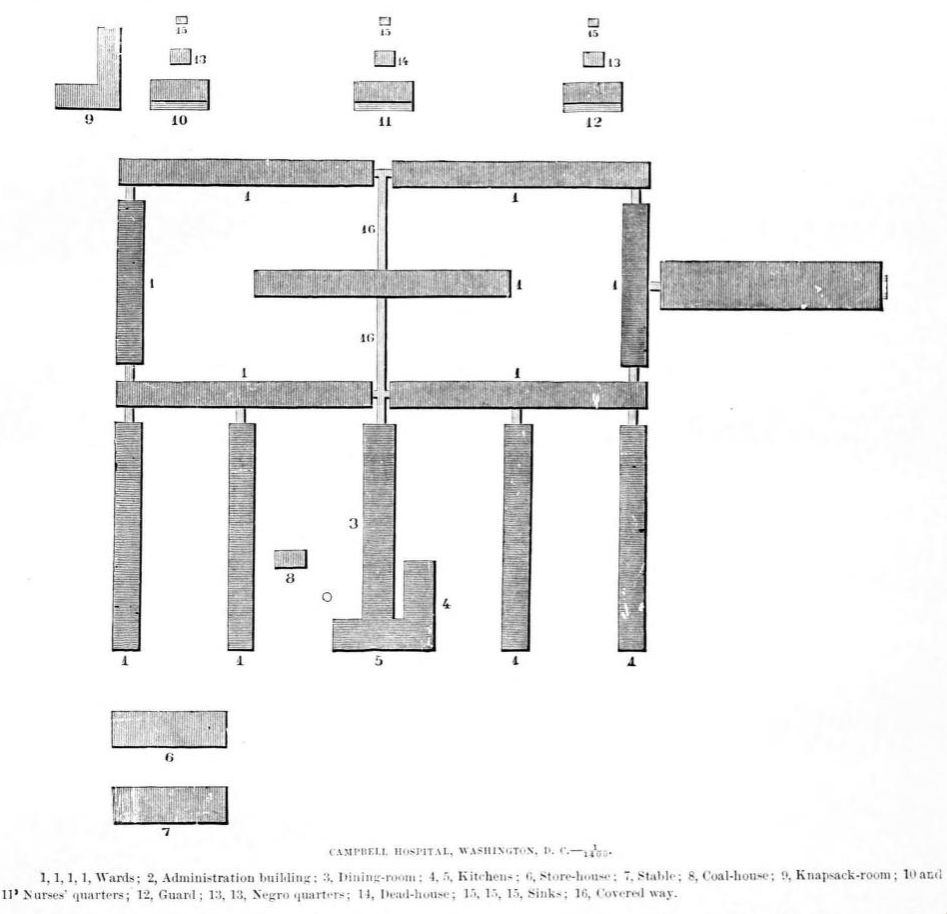
Campbell General Hospital plan

== See also ==
- Washington, D.C., in the American Civil War
- Medicine in the American Civil War
- Armory Square Hospital
- Lincoln Hospital
- Mount Pleasant General Hospital
- Harewood General Hospital
- Finley General Hospital
- Lincoln assassination
- Abraham Lincoln
