= Finley General Hospital =

- Part of military hospitals in the United States
- Washington, D.C.
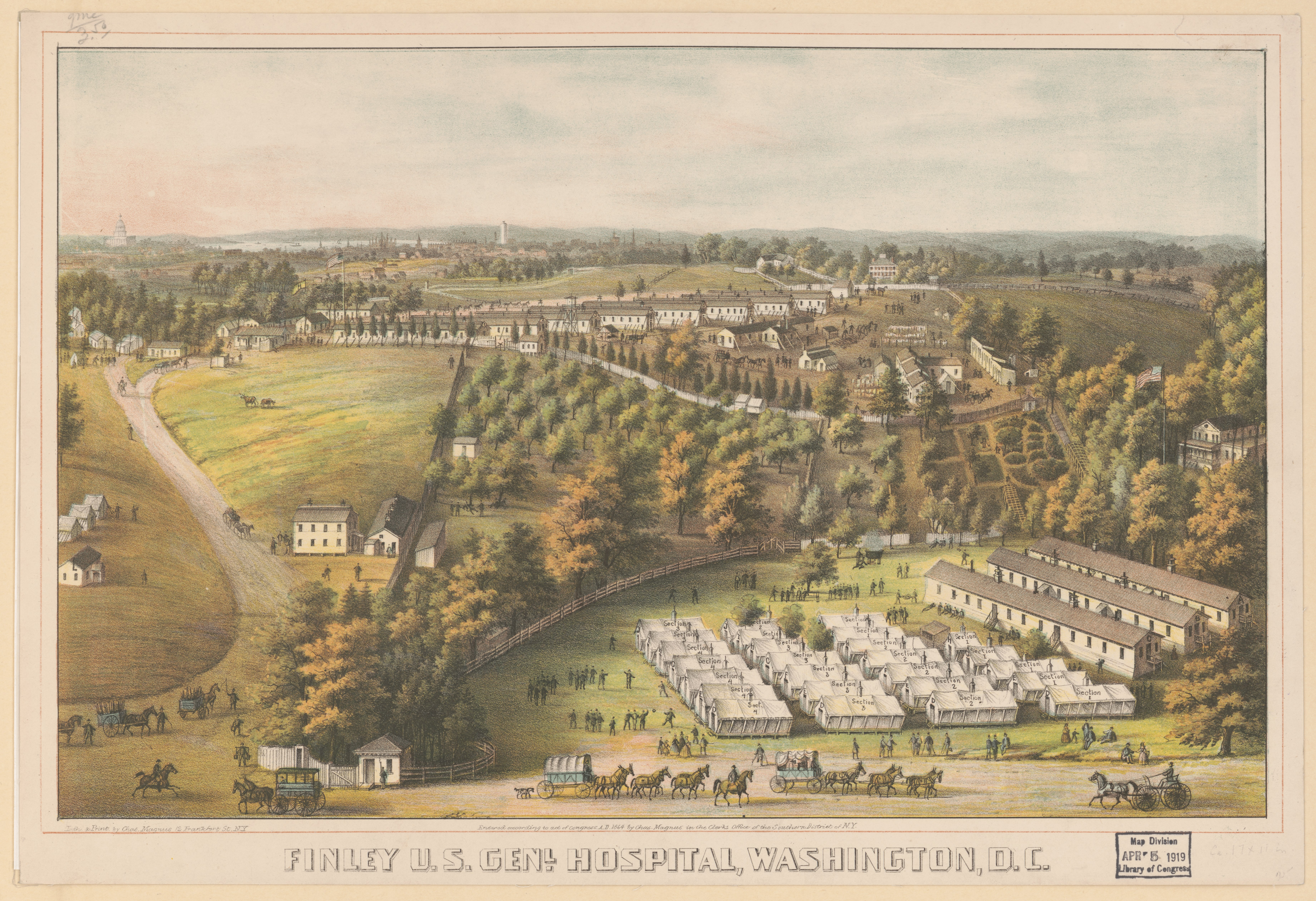
- Finley General Hospital looking south in 1864

Site information
- Controlled by: Union Army

Location
- Coordinates: 38.908325°N 77.000122°W

Site history
- Built: 1862
- In use: 1862–1865
- Battles/wars: American Civil War

Finley General Hospital was a Union Army hospital which operated near Washington, D.C., during the Civil War. It operated from 1862 to 1865.

The hospital was set up with 1,061 beds. On December 17, 1864, 755 beds were occupied.

== Location ==
The precise location of the hospital has been lost over time. However, several sources mention it and it is possible to deduct it from these pieces of information.

Walt Whitman mentions it in December 1862 in the Daily Morning Chronicles:

That little town, as you might suppose it, off there on the brow of a hill, is indeed a town, but of wounds, sickness, and death. It is Finley Hospital, northeast of the city, on Kendall Green, as it used to be call'd.

Gallaudet University was established on land donated by United States Postmaster General Amos Kendall and known as Kendall Green in 1856.

In The War Hospitals, John wells Bulkley writes in 1902:

North of Boundary Street, on the Bladensburg Road, near Kendall Green, were a number of wards, supplemented by office and other buildings, and tents, designated as the Finley Hospital, in charge, from July, 1862, to 1865, of Drs. R. A. Bradley, Jr., and G. L. Pancoast.

A clarification is needed regarding the name of the streets:

- Bladensburg Road is not the current Bladensburg Road (known at the time as Bladensburg Pike or Turnpike). It became known as the Old Bladensburg Road and sits were Delaware Avenue crossed Boundary Street.
- Boundary Street was renamed Florida Avenue on January 14, 1890.

Cantonment Sprague (also known as Camp Sprague), occupied by 1st Regiment R.I. Detached Militia was located next to Mrs. Joseph Gales's Mansion (her husband had died in 1860). The Eckington General Hospital opened in 1862 and closed in April 1863 when it merged with the adjacent Finley General Hospital.

The map below shows the direction to Glenmont Cemetery which still stands today along with "Bladensburg Road".

A confirmed illustration of Finley Hospital (lithography) from 1864 shows the Capitol Building and the Washington Monument.

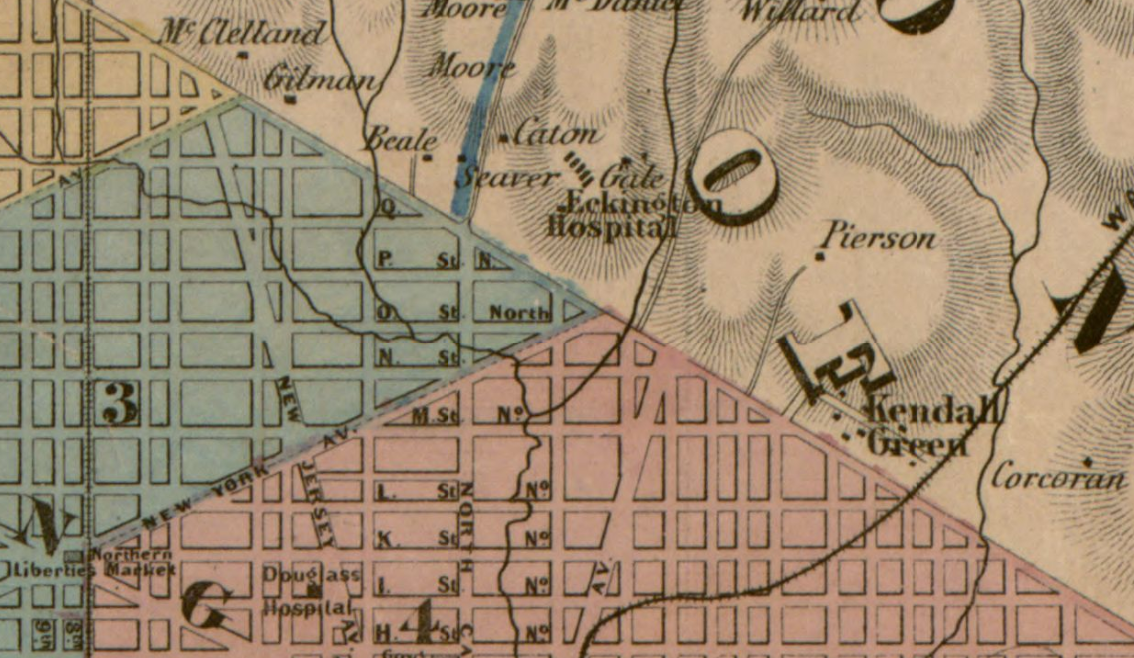
Eckington Hospital and Kendall Green on an 1862 map of Washington City

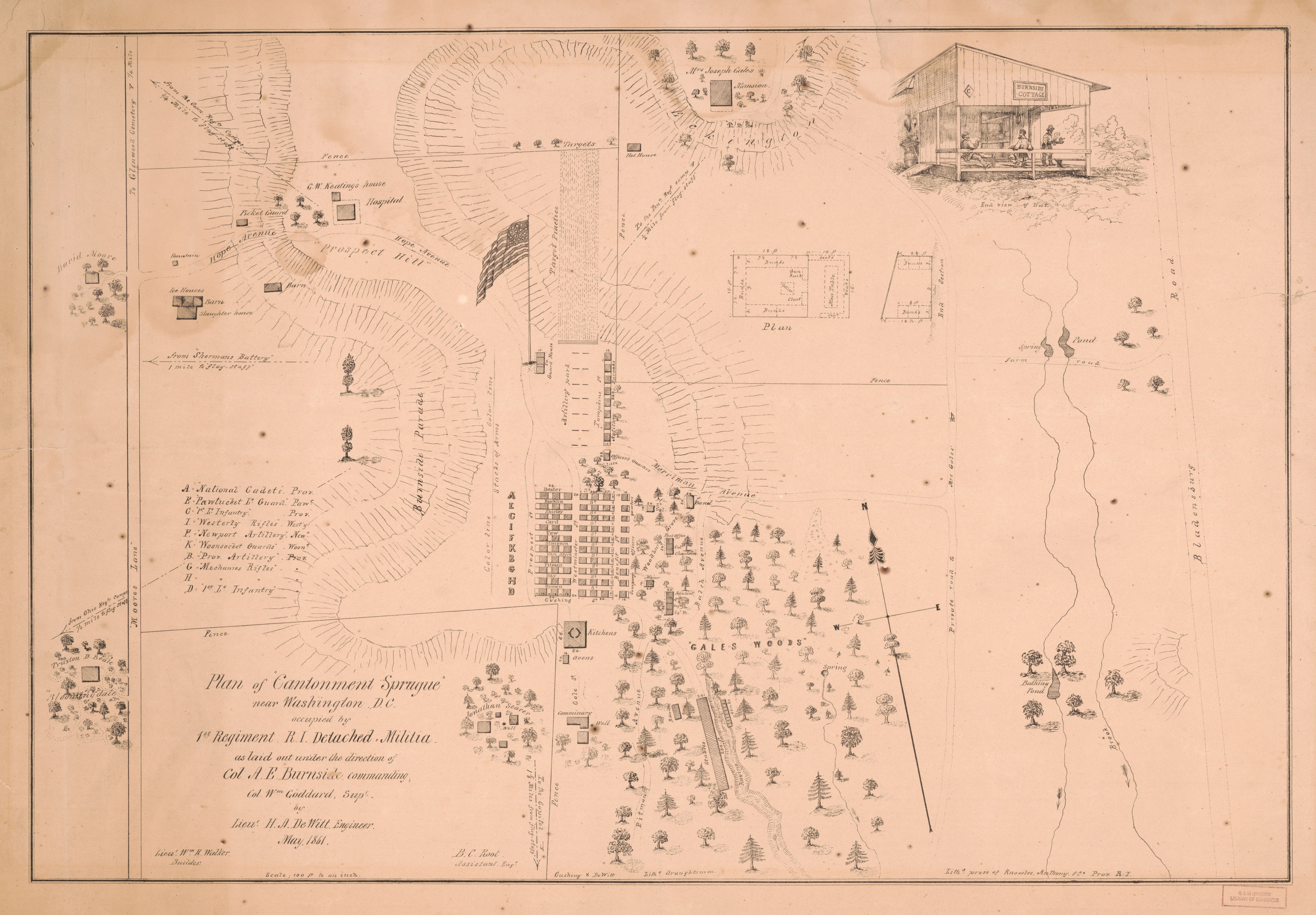
Plan of Camp Sprague showing it location with regards to the Old Bladensburg Road

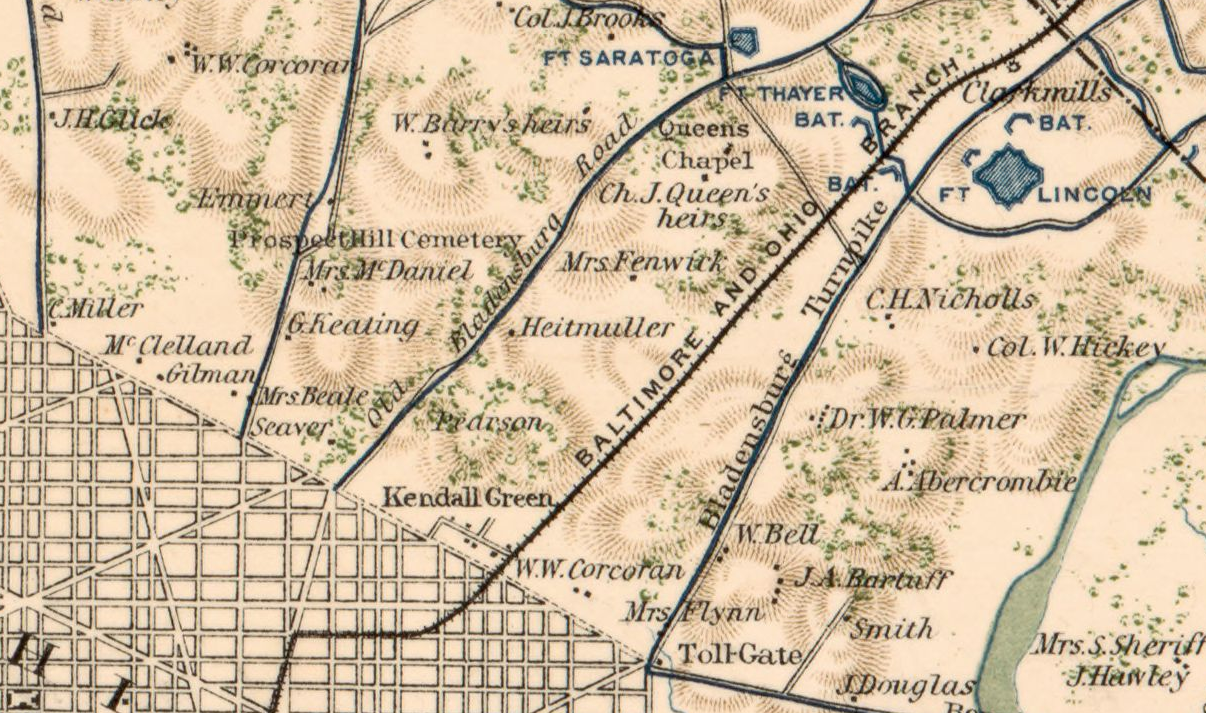
Detail of "Defenses of Washington, extract of military map of N.E. Virginia : showing forts and roads" showing Old Bladensburg Road

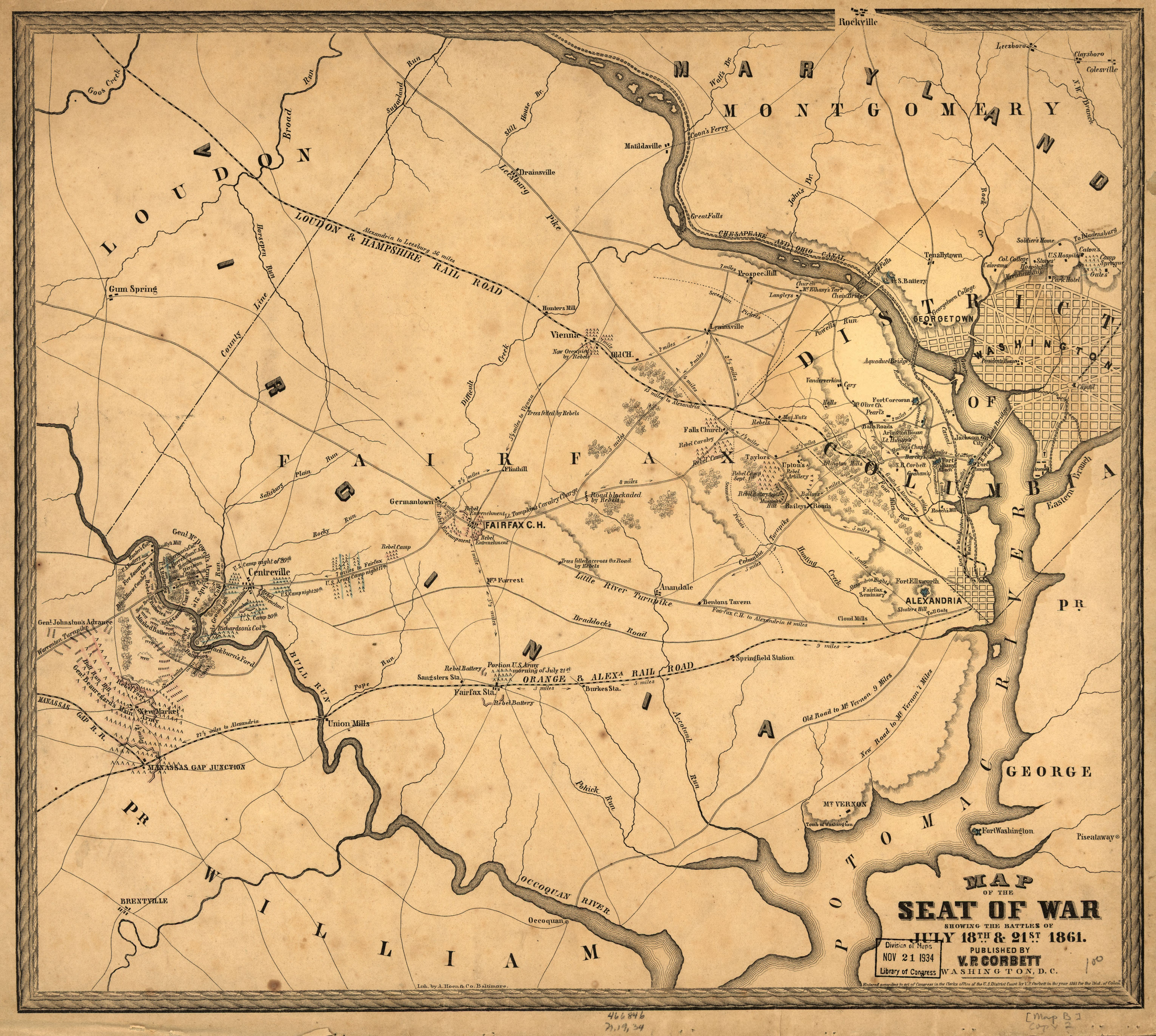
1861 map of Washington City showing Camp Sprague

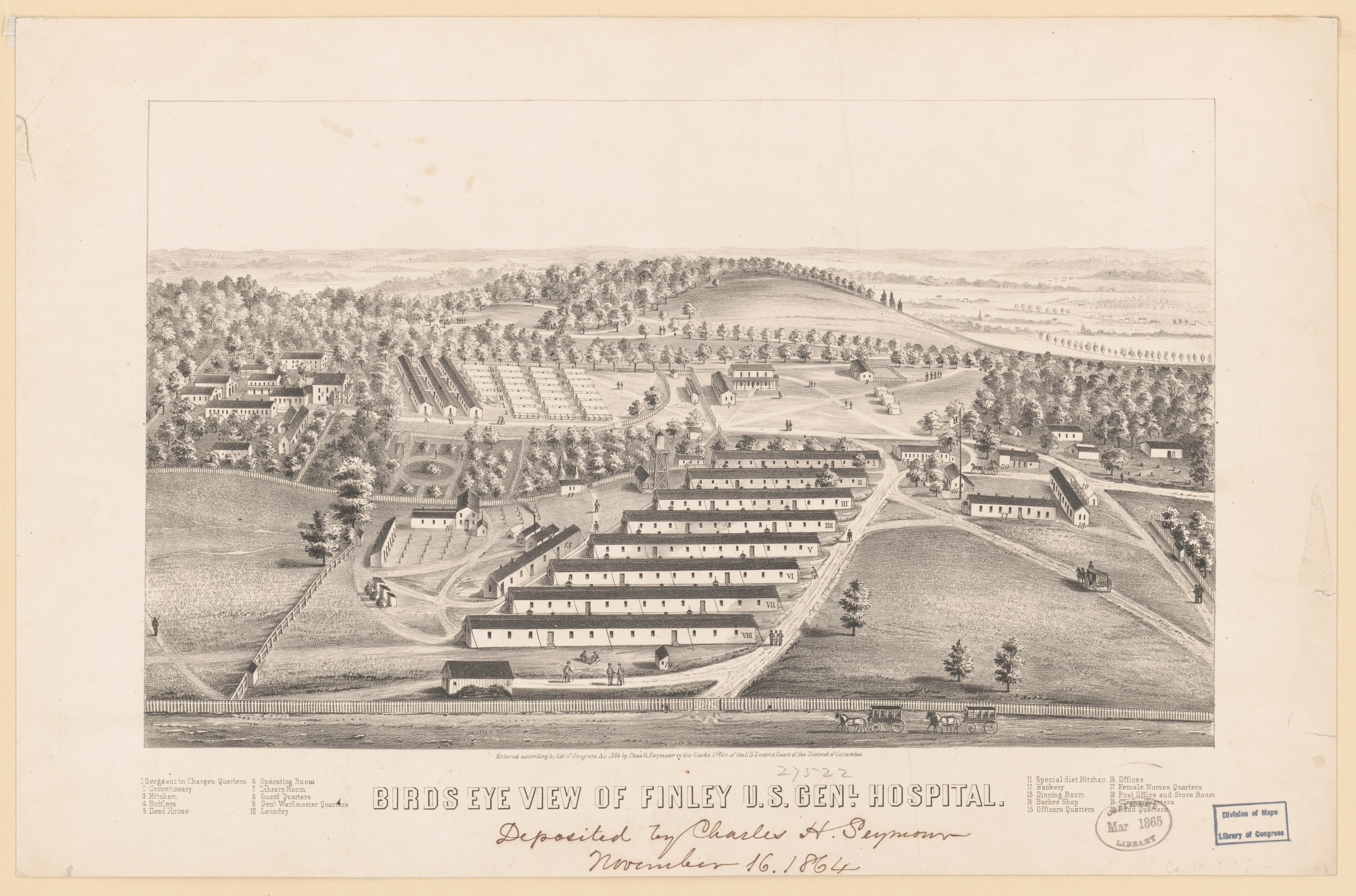
Birds eye view of Finley Hospital in 1865

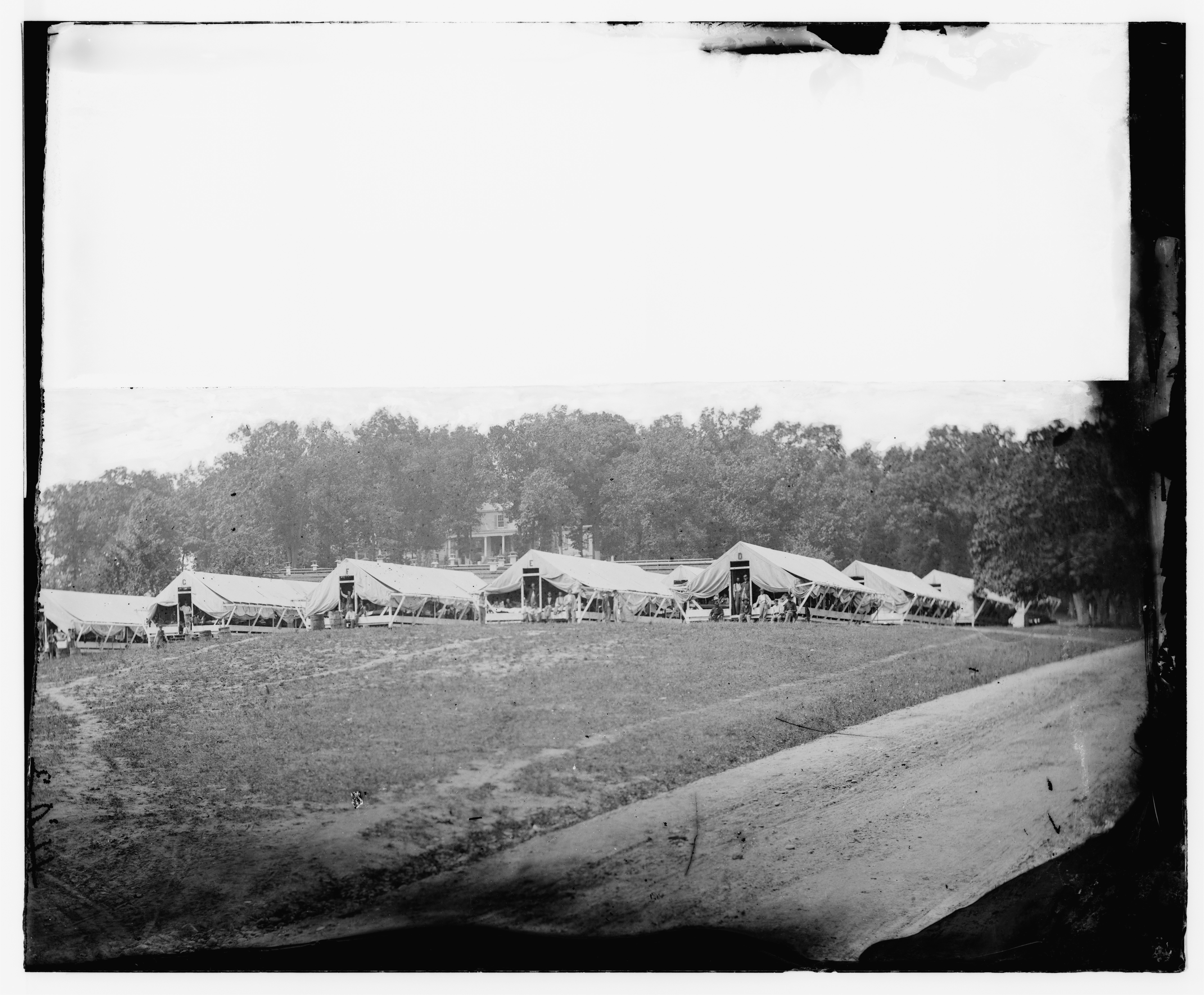
Hospital Camp on Kendall Green during the Civil War. This was probably Finley Hospital

== See also ==
- Washington, D.C., in the American Civil War
- Medicine in the American Civil War
- Armory Square Hospital
- Lincoln Hospital
- Mount Pleasant General Hospital
- Harewood General Hospital
- Gallaudet University
- Joseph Gales
