= Armory Square Hospital =

Hospital in Washington, D.C. (1862–1865)

- Part of military hospitals in the United States
- Washington, D.C.
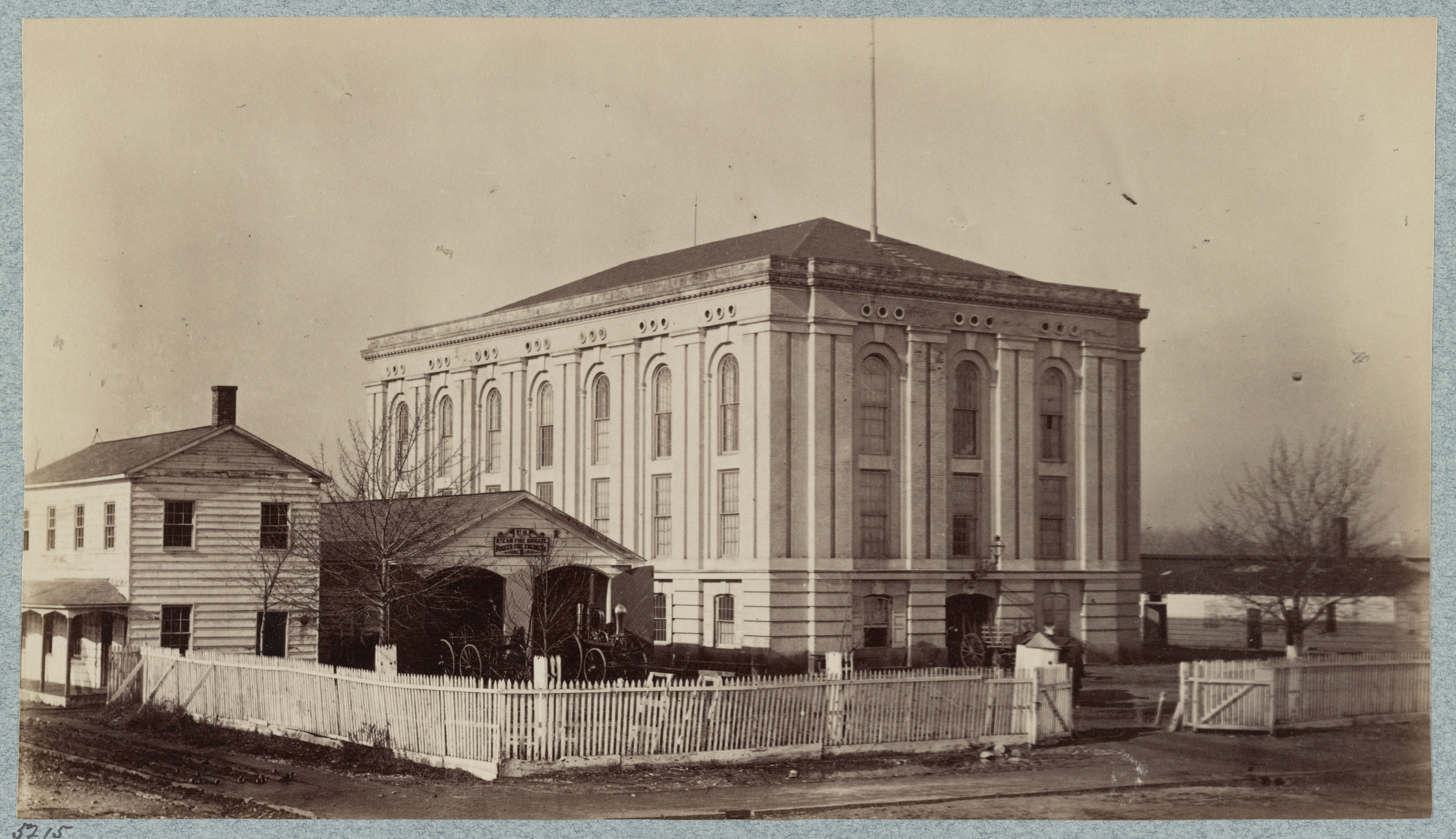

Site information
- Controlled by: Union Army

Location
- Coordinates: 38.8877778°N 77.0205556°W

Site history
- Built: 1862
- In use: 1862–1865
- Demolished: 1964
- Battles/wars: American Civil War

The Armory Square Hospital formally known as the District Armory or Armory of the District of Columbia was a military hospital for the Union Army located on the National Mall in Washington, D.C., which operated from 1862 to 1865. It stood at the intersection of 6th Street SW and B Street SW (now Independence Avenue) between the Smithsonian Castle and the Capitol. The 12 wards extended across the Mall, all the way to the Canal. Today, the National Air and Space Museum stands in its place.

== History ==
=== The Armory ===
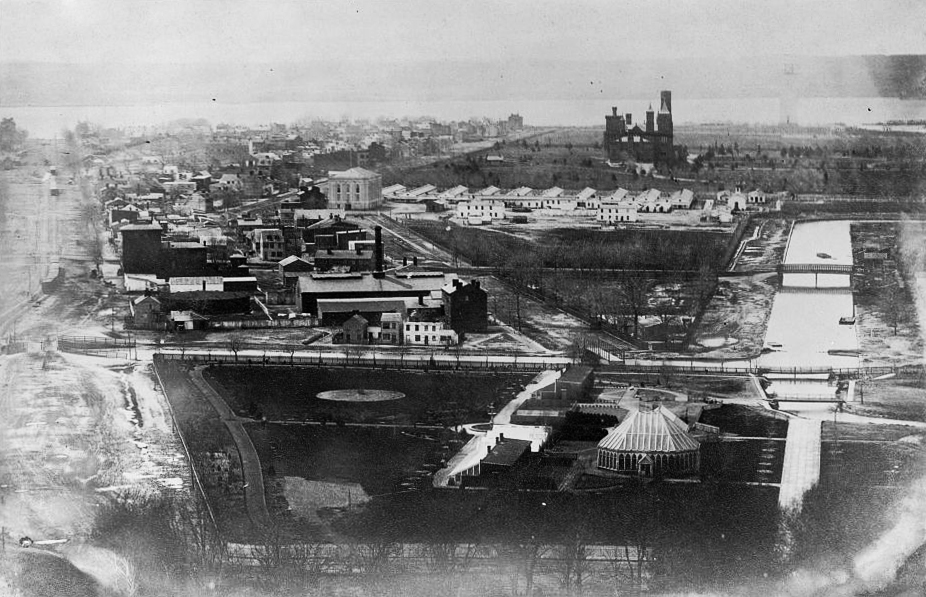
View of the Mall in 1863 with the Armory and the Wards along with the Smithsonian Castle and the Canal.

On March 11, 1856, President Franklin Pierce sent a message to the Senate Committee on Military Affairs with information regarding a suitable location for an Armory for "the preservation of ordnance, arms, etc., in Washington". The report was passed from the Ordnance Officer to Secretary of War Jefferson Davis and then to the President. Five sites were analysed and the second one was recommended.

The next site examined was at the intersection of B street south and Sixth street west, north of the former street and west of the latter. Situated at a nearly central point, the ground was "level and firm enough for building on" with easy access from other parts of the city and "ample space on the government reservation contiguous to the site not only for future extension of the building, but for military parade grounds, with little hazard of these two advantages of space being trenched upon by other improvements.

Based on these recommendations, the Armory was built that same year next to the canal.

=== The Hospital ===
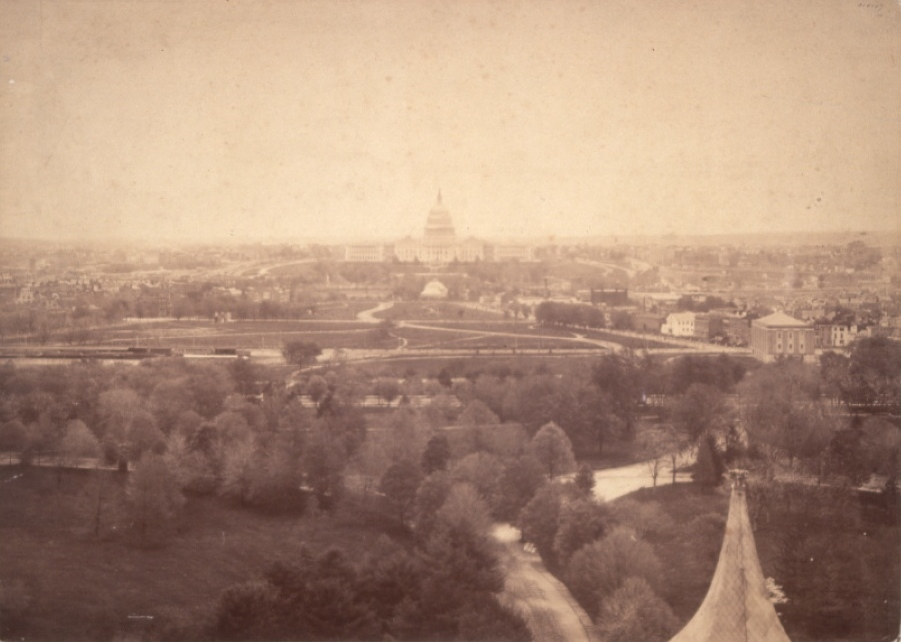
View of the eastern side of the Mall in 1879. The Armory is the first square building on the right.

Following the American Civil War's 1861 beginning, President Abraham Lincoln asked Doctor Willard Bliss to organize a system of hospitals in and around the city of Washington, D.C. Among the facilities which resulted from this directive were several facilities which were built in or near Washington, D.C., including the Armory Square Hospital, which was built on the land surrounding the city's Armory in 1862.

It offered 1,000 beds in twelve wards (barracks) and overflow tents to treat the wounded from the battlefields of Virginia. Wounded soldiers were brought across the Potomac River to the city wharves in southwest Washington, D.C., including the Fish Wharf as well as on the Long Bridge which landed at the other end of Maryland Avenue SW a few blocks away. In addition to these barracks, quarters for officers, service facilities and a chapel were built on site.

The closest to the arrival points for the steamboats of all of the Washington, D.C.–based Union Army hospitals, it became the treatment facility where the gravely wounded remained, receiving end-of-life care if terminally ill or undergoing additional surgeries or other types of treatment until well enough to be shipped home or moved to a hospital farther away from the war. Volunteers from the northern States came to provide assistance in the hospitals including the Armory as nurses as well as support staff. Dr. Bliss became the superintendent for the hospital and remained to practice in the city after the war.

Among those volunteers was poet Walt Whitman, who had made his way from New York to Washington, D.C., after reading that his brother might have been wounded. After finding his brother and learning that he had sustained only a minor injury, Whitman realized the depth of suffering that other less fortunate soldiers were enduring, and began volunteering as part of the Christian Commission in the city hospitals, visiting wounded soldiers and developing close relationships with many of them and raising money for provisions for them. This experience would have a profound influence on him and his later writings. In The Wound Dresser, he wrote:

I devote myself much to Armory-square hospital because it contains by far the worst cases, most repulsive wounds, has the most suffering and most need of consolation. I go every day without fail, and often at night – sometimes stay very late.

Close to the White House, the Armory hospital was visited by President Lincoln in 1863, as reported by Amanda Akin Stearns in her memoir, The lady nurse of Ward E, which was published in 1909:

It was pathetic to see him pass from bed to bed and give each occupant the warm, honest grasp for which he is noted. I hear that he is especially interested in this hospital, and has suggested having flower beds made between the wards with plants from the Government gardens, which Dr. Bliss is having done. His homely face with such sad eyes and ungainly figure did not fill my youthful idea of a "President of the United States"; but it was a grand thing for him to come and cheer our soldier boys with his presence.

Hospital chaplains also worked to ease the suffering of wounded soldiers, dispensing books and other reading materials, as well as words of comfort and advice. The first issue of the Armory Square Hospital Gazette was published on January 6, 1864. In an article entitle Salutatory, the publisher wrote: "the hospital is an episode in soldier's life—sometimes a painful termination of it, which has many an event worthy of a chronicle. Such we propose this paper to be.

The Gazette went on for several months, offering reading and news updates to patients and recognition staff for their service. The last issue was published on the 21 August 1865. With hostilities ended following the Surrender at Appomattox on April 9, 1865, and the resulting decline in the number of patients being sent to Union Army hospitals, military leaders determined that the Armory hospital was no longer needed and was closed during the summer of 1865. The last edition of the hospital newspaper, which was published on 21 August 1865, offered the following reflection:

During the last three years, thousands of our brave soldiers have been inmates of Armory Square [...] One cannot conceive of a gun-shot wound that has not been treated here. Of nearly every disease in the catalogue we have had examples. Such an opportunity for the practice of surgery, or the study of pathology and the treatment of disease, will not probably occur again soon. God grant that the stern emergency of a bloody civil war, which rendered so many asylums for our wounded and sick soldiers a necessity, may never again arise to curse with its mildew blights our native land.

We now bid adieu to Armory Square—but not without some regrets [...] Within its walls we have learned many a lesson of wisdom, of patience under suffering—of the keenest grief—of faith, forgiveness, of true manhood.

The hospital buildings north of the Armory began to be demolished in 1867, although the Armory building itself remained in use. By 1873 landscaping of the area as part of the Armory Square portion of the National Mall began.

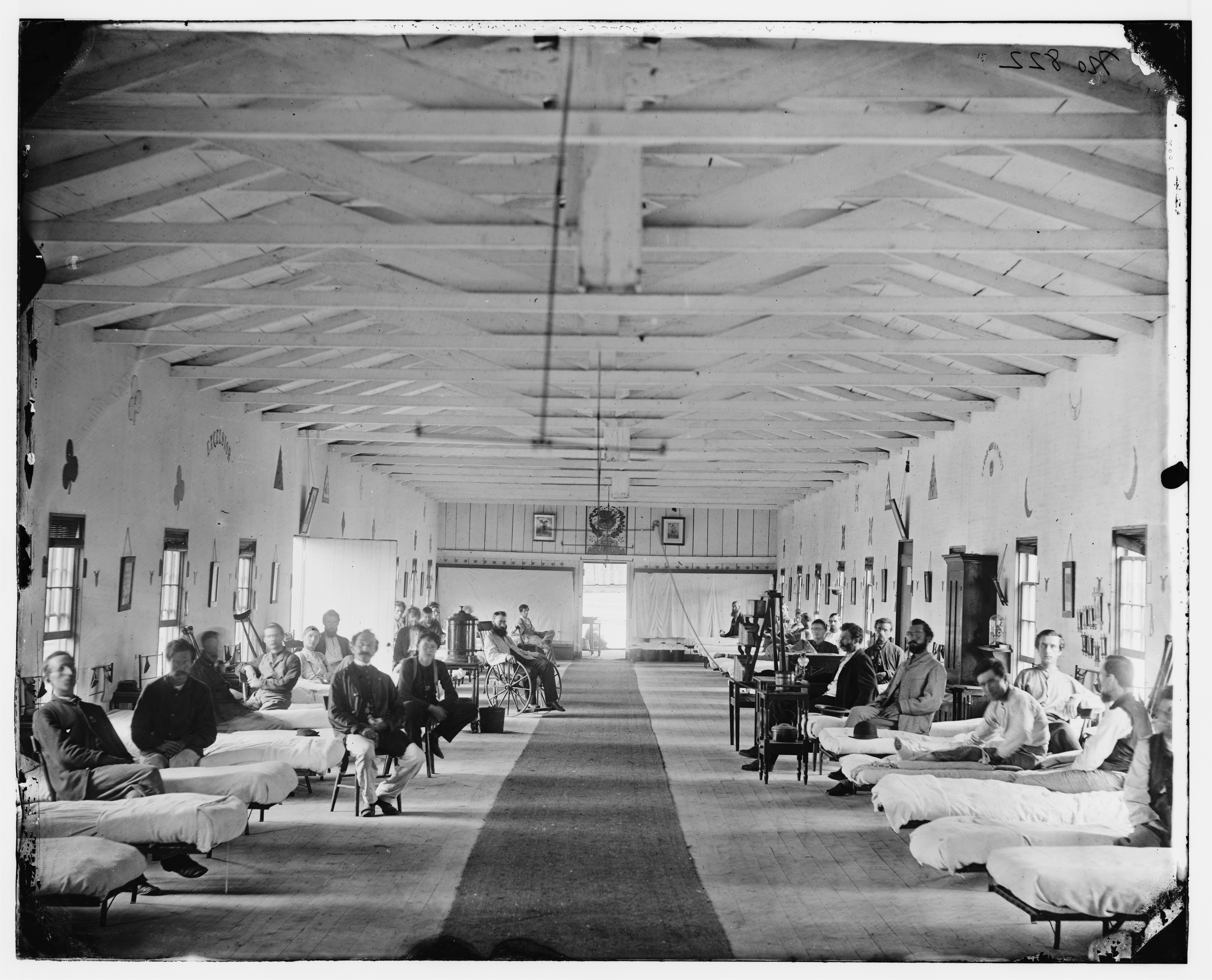
Patients in Ward K

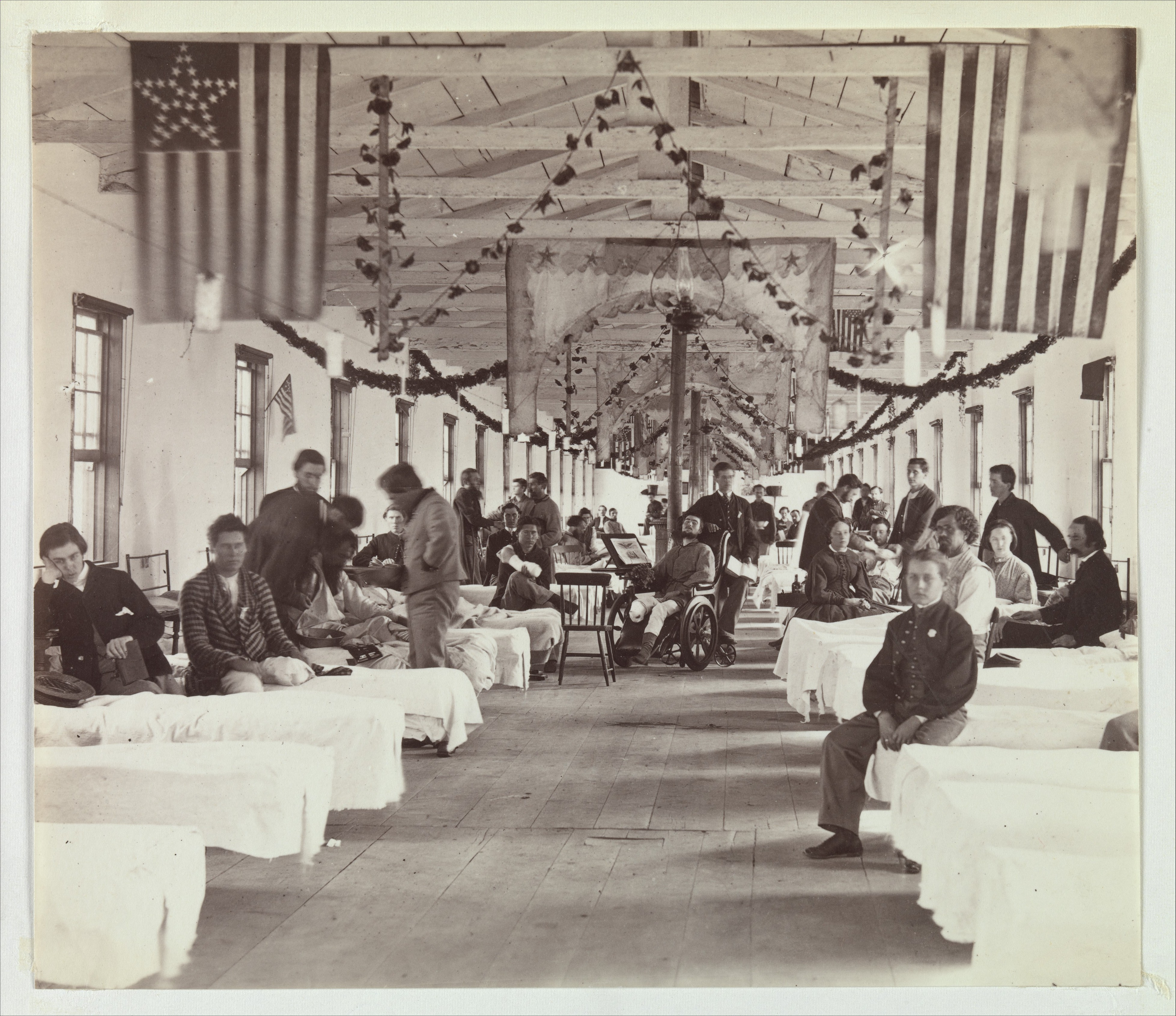
Some of the wounded soldiers in a Ward

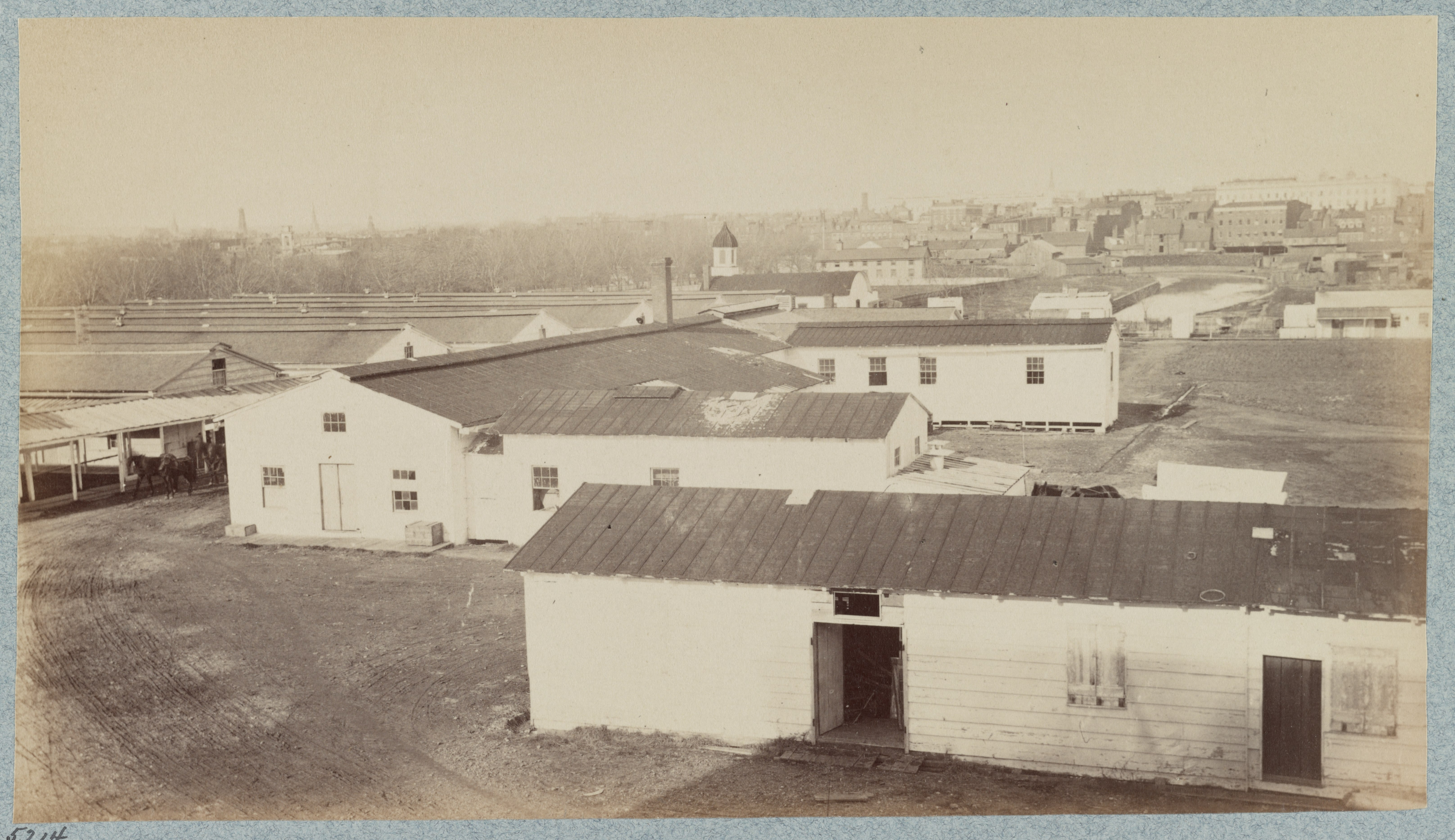
The Wards, Chapel and other buildings

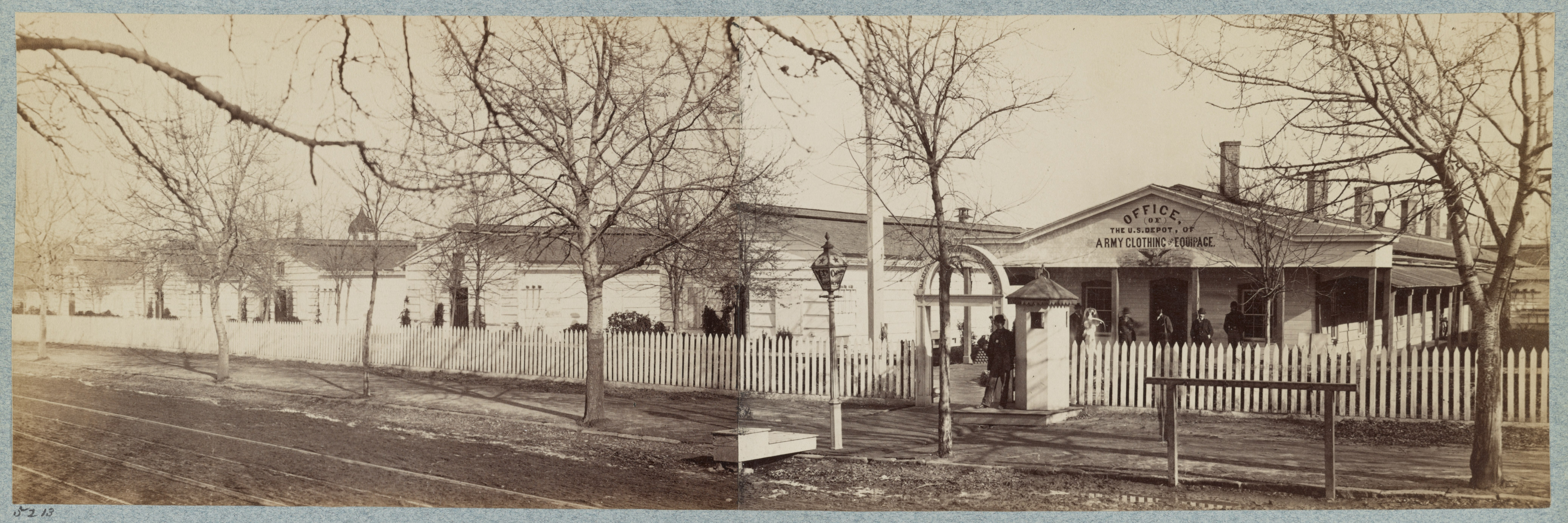
The Office

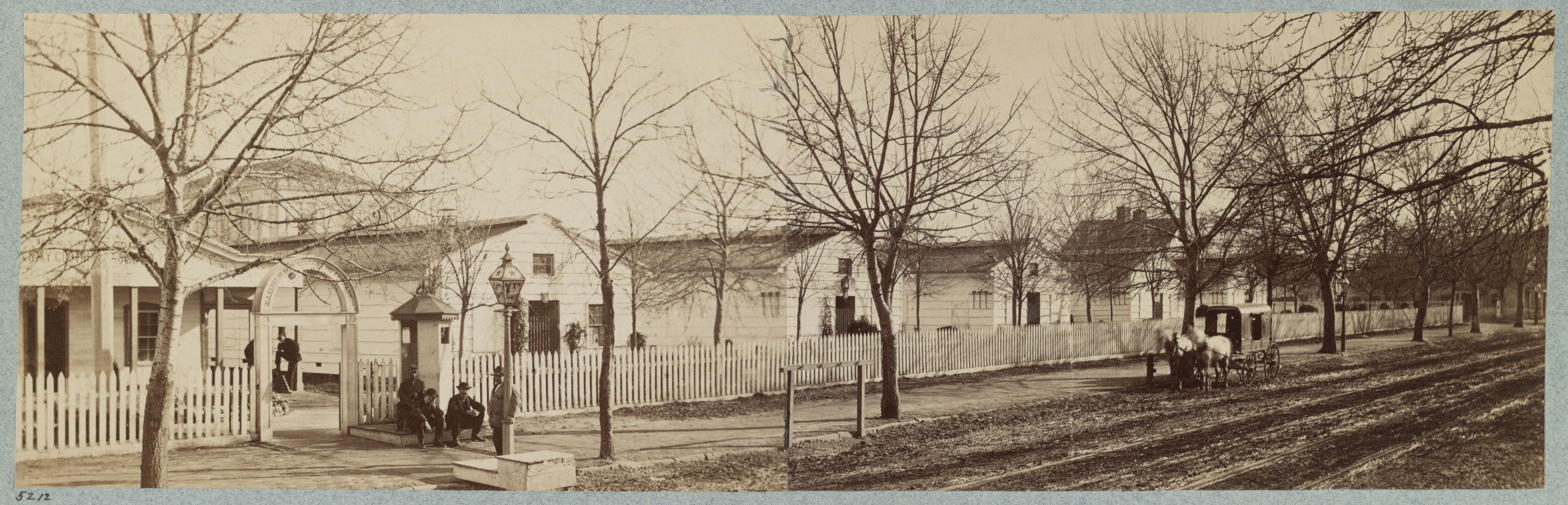
The Wards

The chapel and other buildings

=== Later history ===
The Armory Building was used for a time as a storage facility until the Smithsonian Arts and Industries Building was constructed. During 1881 to 1932 it served as the United States Fish Commission headquarters. A series of temporary buildings of the National Mall existed alongside the building beginning in 1918. Finally in January 1964, it was demolished to make way for the National Air and Space Museum.

== See also ==
- Washington, D.C., in the American Civil War
- Medicine in the American Civil War
- Finley Hospital
- Lincoln Hospital
- Mount Pleasant General Hospital
- Harewood General Hospital
