= Mount Pleasant General Hospital =

- Part of military hospitals in the United States
- Washington, D.C.
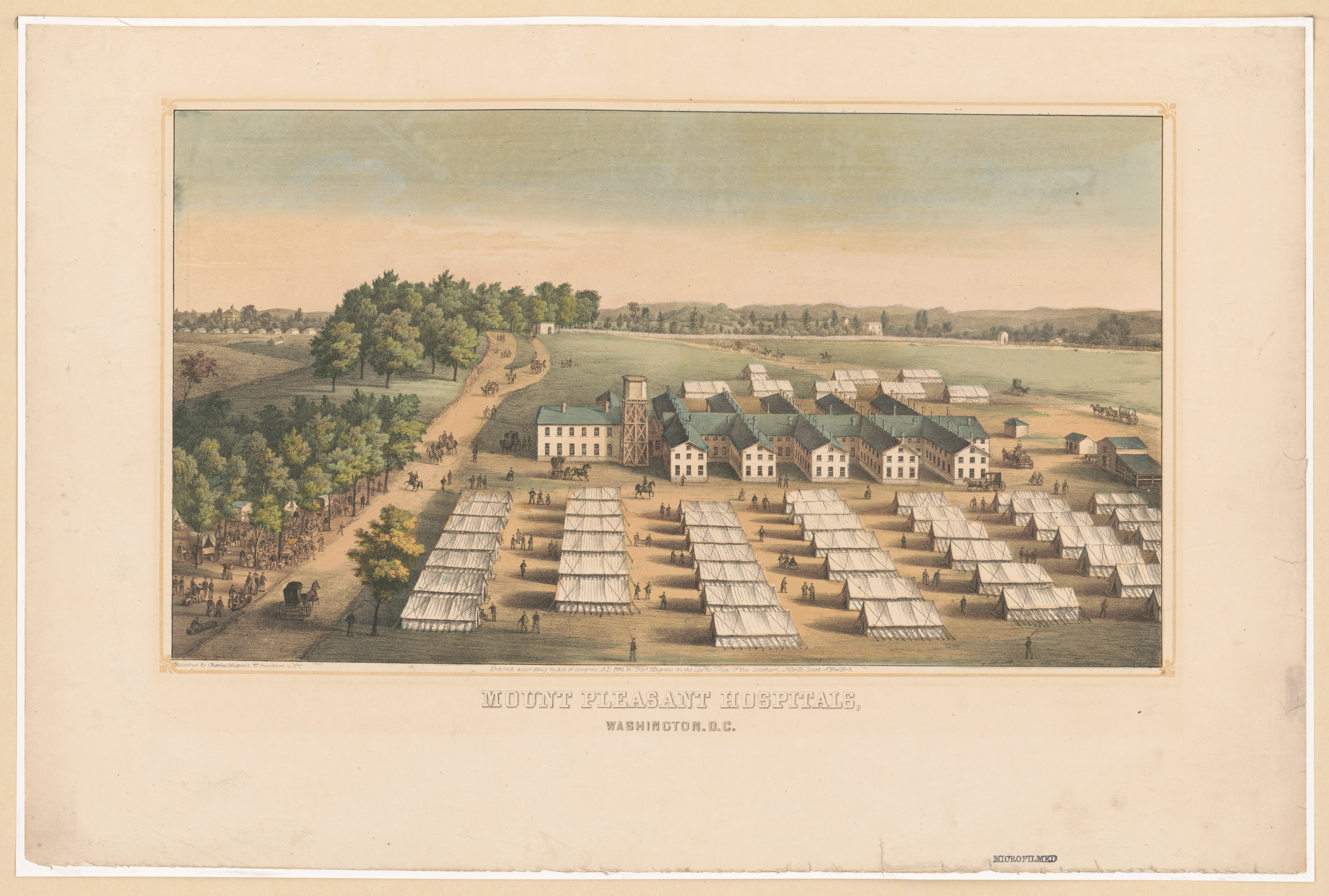
- Mount Pleasant General Hospital

Site information
- Controlled by: Union Army

Location
- Coordinates: 38.930434°N 77.032577°W

Site history
- Built: 1862
- In use: 1862–1865
- Battles/wars: American Civil War

Mount Pleasant General Hospital was a Union Civil War hospital in northwest Washington, D.C., which operated from March 28, 1862, to August 10, 1865.

== Location ==
The hospital was located on Meridian hill, east of 14th Street NW, North of Stone General Hospital probably north of Prince's Mill Road (now Park Road NW).

It is unclear who owned the land. Two versions exist:

- The first version is that the land belonged to Samuel P. Brown who had purchased it the same year from William Selden. Selden was a Confederate sympathizer who had been forced to move back to his native Virginia when the Civil War started.
- The second version is that it belonged to Mr. Stone.

== History ==
Mount Pleasant General Hospital was a purpose-built hospital built in the winter of 1861-1862. During construction the buildings were guarded day and night by 9 soldiers under the orders of General Sykes to prevent attempts of incendiarism. It was based on plans provided by P.B. Wight, Esq. of New York and built under the approval of the Sanitary Commission.

It covered about an acre and a half and contained ten wards along with a kitchen and an administration building two stories high on the south side, 80 feet long and connected to the back via a 275 feet long corridor to the wards (five on each side of it). A 27 feet wide yard was added between each building to introduce light and ventilation to the wards.

The wards were 87 feet long and 28 feet wide and had both gas and water. The surgical room will be at the end of the corridor on the north side. It was fitted with the necessary equipment found in hospitals at the time. The kitchen laundry and other supporting services were on the east side of the administration building.

In total, the whole structure was 380 feet long by 200 wide. All the buildings were constructed on piles and elevated 3 feet above the ground to limit the dampness from the soil.

Designed originally for 400 patients, the hospital had a total of 1,618 beds. On the Census of December 17, 1864, 898 beds were occupied. This number was possible with the addition of tents.

== Pictures ==
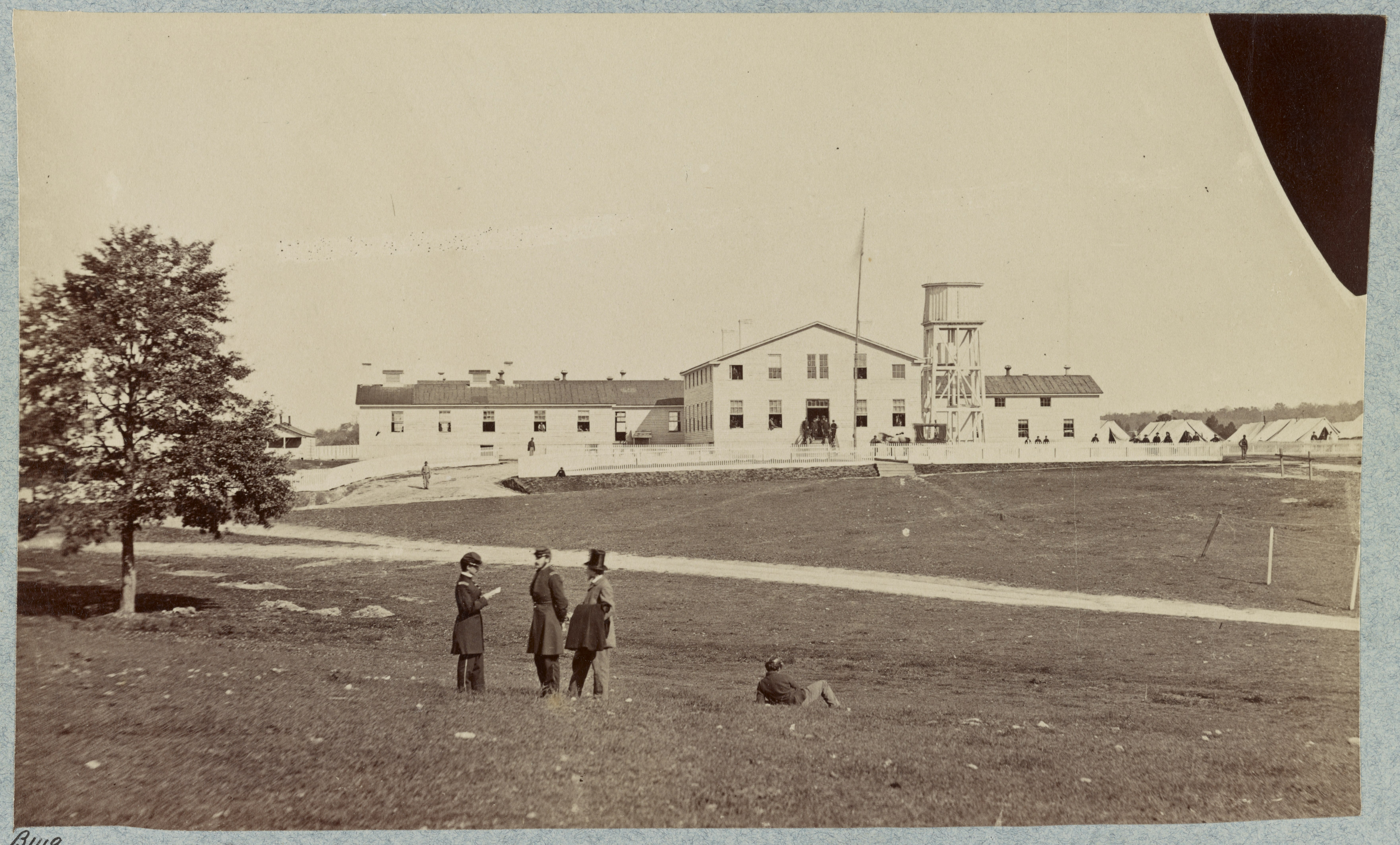
Mount Pleasant Hospital - The administration building facing south

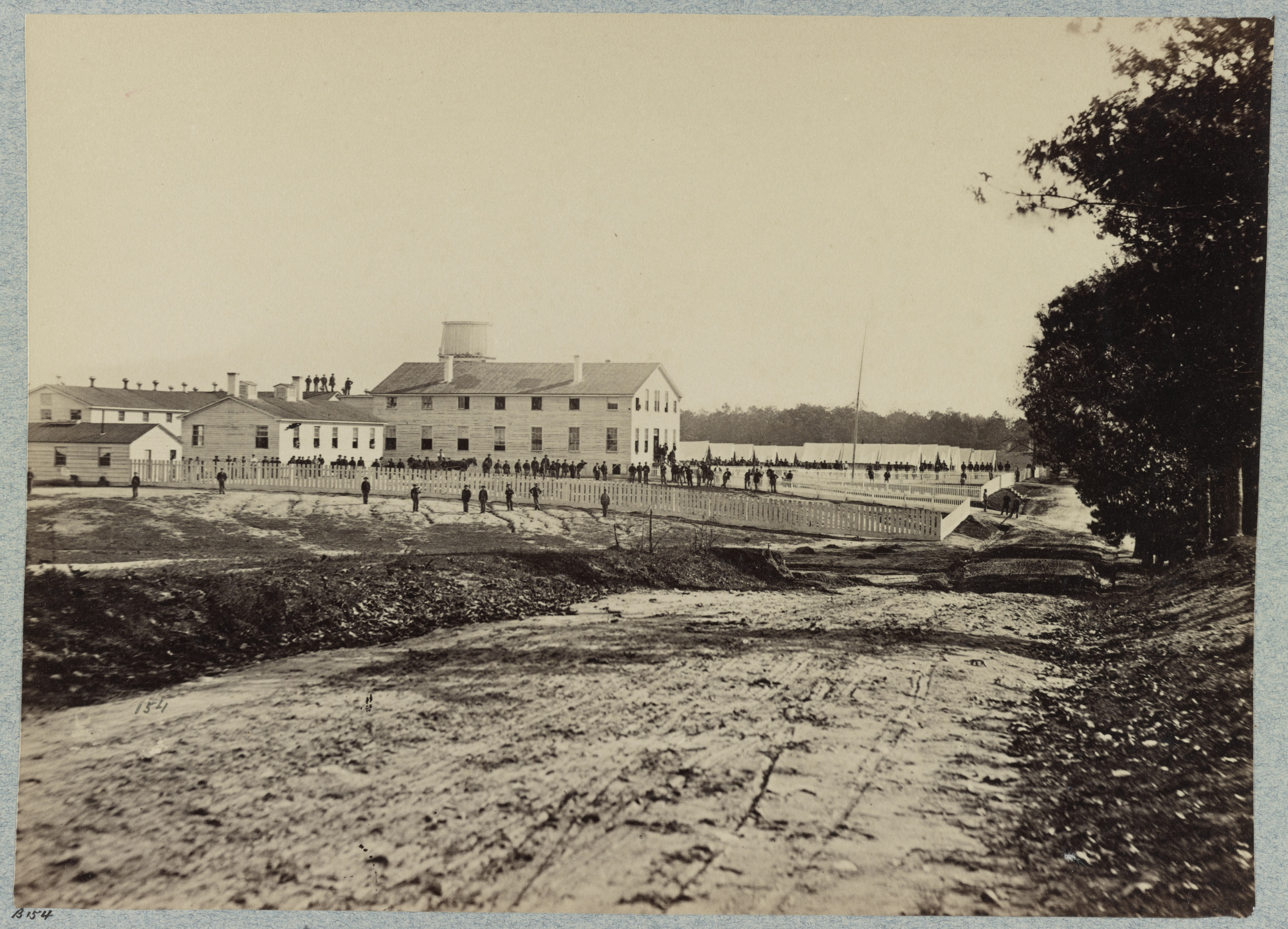
Mount Pleasant Hospital - View from the road looking east

== See also ==
- Washington, D.C., in the American Civil War
- Medicine in the American Civil War
- Armory Square Hospital
- Finley Hospital
- Lincoln Hospital
- Harewood General Hospital
