= Lincoln Park (Washington, D.C.) =

Park in Washington, D.C., U.S.

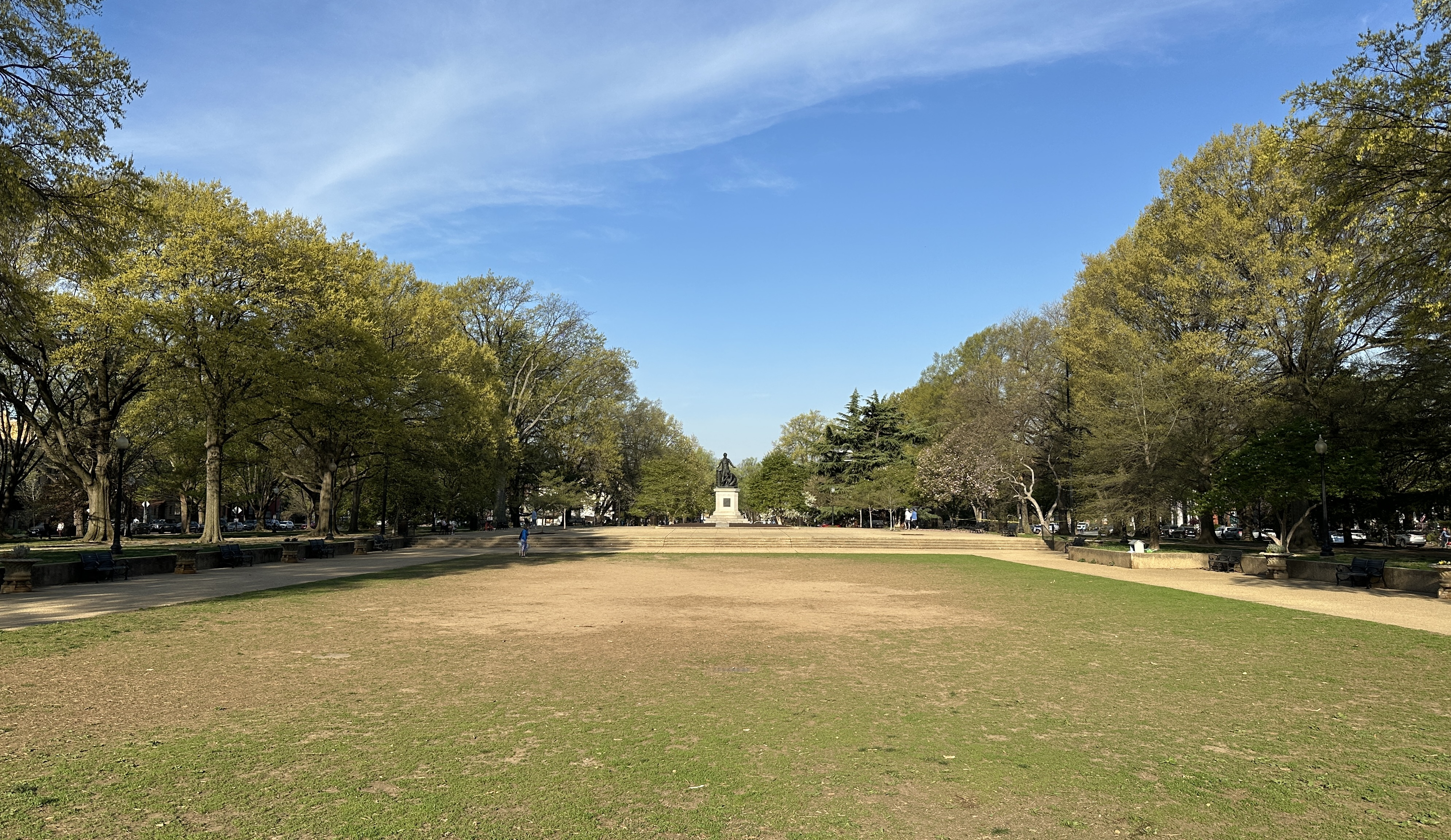
- Lincoln Park in 2026 looking west towards the Emancipation Memorial

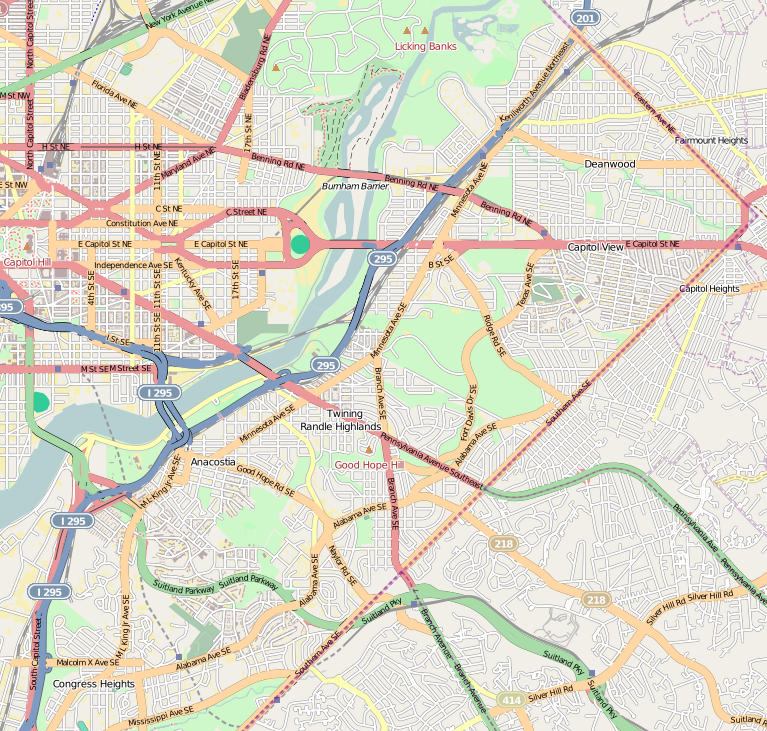
- Location within Washington, D.C.
- Location: Washington, D.C.
- Coordinates: 38°53′23″N 76°59′23″W
- Created: 1867
- Website: www.nps.gov/cahi/learn/historyculture/cahi_lincoln.htm

Lincoln Hospital
- Part of military hospitals in the United States
- Washington, D.C.
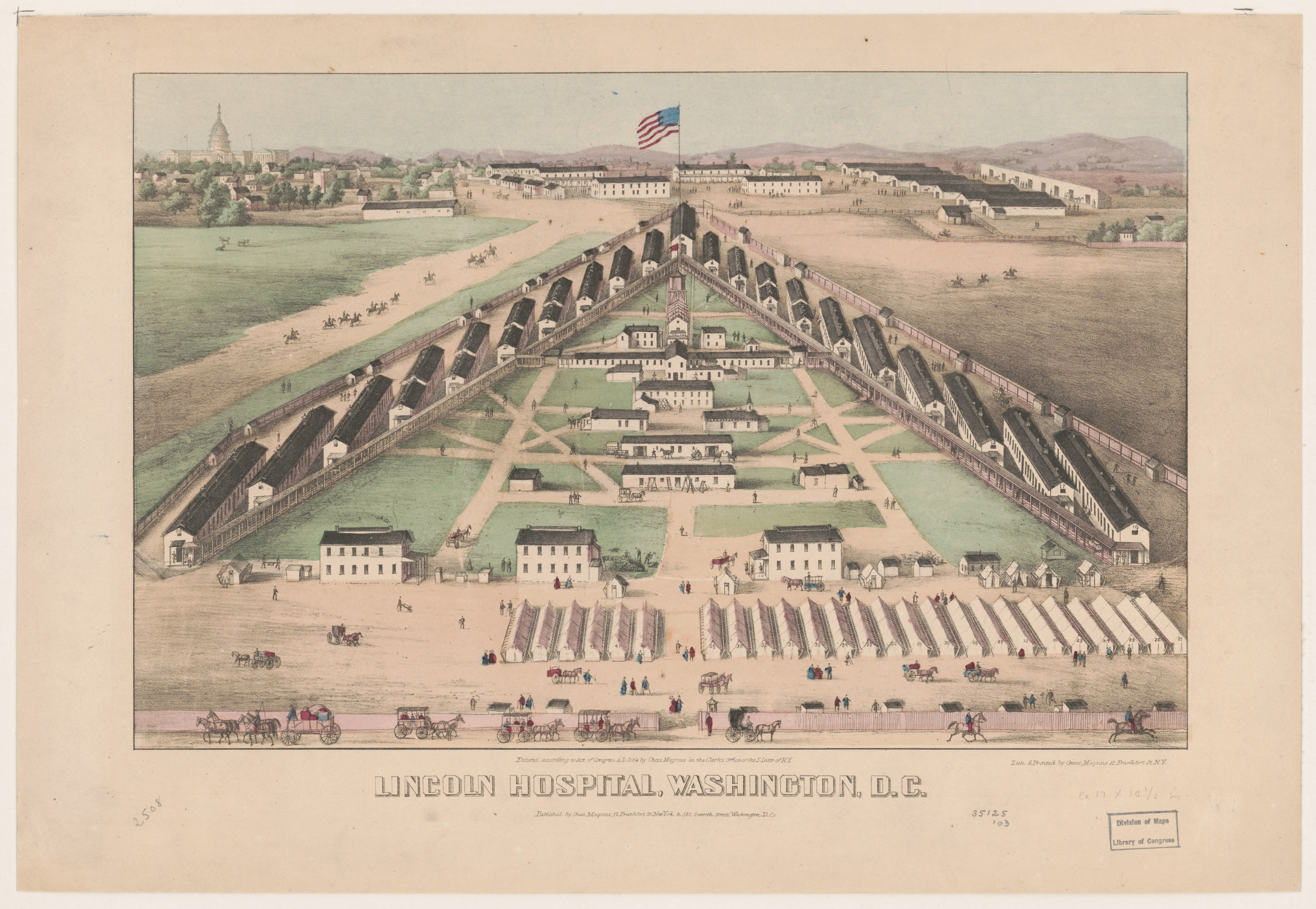
- Lincoln Hospital during the Civil War

Site information
- Controlled by: Union Army

Site history
- Built: 1862
- In use: 1862–1865
- Demolished: 1865
- Battles/wars: American Civil War

Lincoln Park, historically known as Lincoln Square, is the largest urban park located in the Capitol Hill neighborhood of Washington, D.C., United States. From 1862 to 1865, during the American Civil War, it was the site of Lincoln Hospital, then the largest hospital in Washington, D.C. It is located along East Capitol Street, which surrounds the park.

== Location ==
Situated one mile directly east of the United States Capitol, Lincoln Park is maintained by the National Park Service. The park is bounded by 11th Street NE and SE on the west, 13th Street NE and SE on the east, East Capitol Street NE on the North, and East Capitol Street SE on the south. It is four blocks northeast of Eastern Market.

The eastern end of the park includes two separate, enclosed play areas for young children. The grassy perimeter and central turf area are popular with neighborhood dogs and their owners.

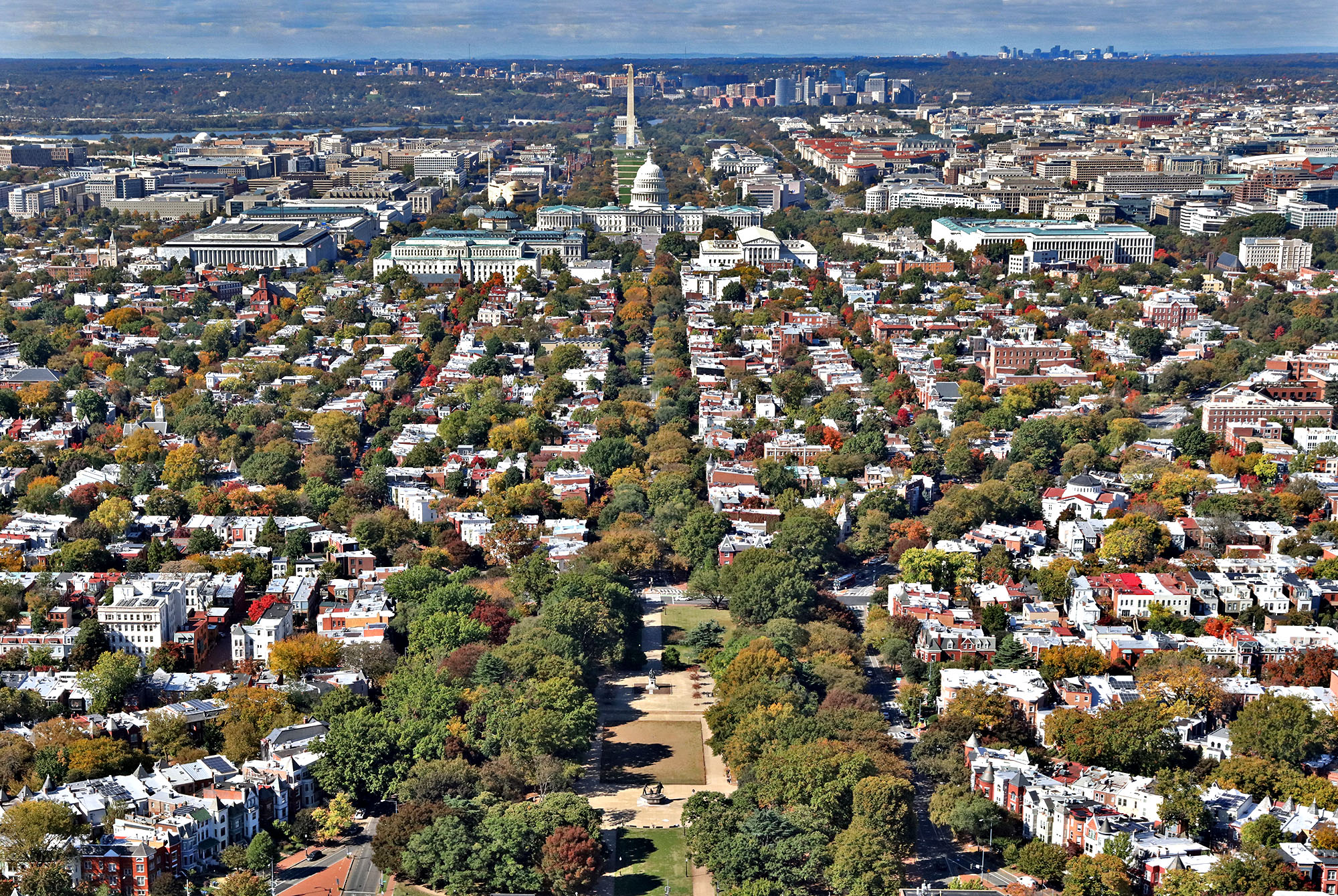
An aerial view of Lincoln Park looking northwest

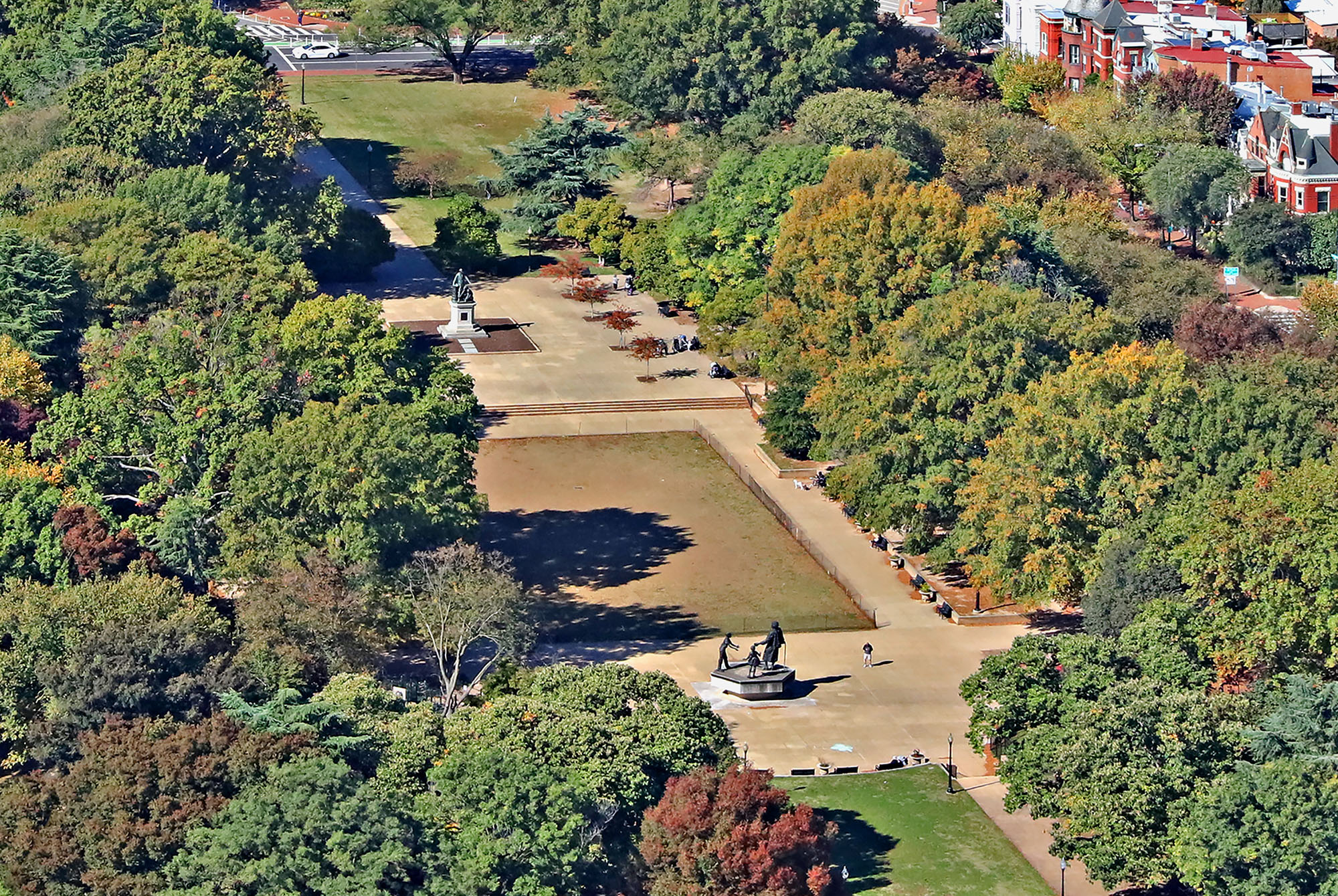
Lincoln Park, Washington DC, Aerial, Looking NW

== History ==
Pierre Charles L'Enfant included the park in his original 1791 plan for the District of Columbia, intending it for public use. Though it was originally planned as the point from which all distances in North America would be measured (a zero milepost), it was not ultimately utilized for this purpose. Instead, the park was used as a dumping ground.

During the Civil War, it became the site where Lincoln Hospital was built to take care of the wounded Union Army soldiers. While there were many others around the city, it was the largest in the area built by the Army. It included 20 pavilions arranged in a V formation. 25 tent wards provided beds for 2,575 wounded. Covered pathways connected the kitchen and dining rooms.

The other buildings on site were:

- the headquarters (marked by the flag)
- the officers' quarters
- the quarters for the Sisters providing the nursing care
- the barracks
- a guard house
- separate quarters for contraband
- service facilities: a water tank, laundry, barber shop, carpenter shop, stables, and a morgue ("Dead House").

Like many of the other hospitals in the area, Lincoln Hospital was visited by family members as well as well-wishers. One such visitor was Vinnie Ream, a talented mezzo-soprano (who later gained fame as Lincoln's sculptor). She performed at the hospital in April 1864.

It was also visited by Walt Whitman, who was visiting injured soldiers in the local hospitals. He mentions it in his writings:

Aug., Sep., and Oct., '63. ... Then there is Carver hospital, larger still, a wall'd and military city regularly laid out, and guarded by squads of sentries. Again, off east, Lincoln hospital, a still larger one; and half a mile further Emory hospital.

— Walt Whitman, "Hospitals Ensemble", Complete Prose Works (1892)

2,012 beds were occupied as of December 17, 1864.

As with most hospitals in the area, with the end of the Civil War in 1865, it was taken down that year. In 1867, Congress authorized the grounds to be called Lincoln Square as a memorial to the former president; it was the first public site to bear his name.

== Statues ==
The park features two important sculptures:

- Thomas Ball's 1876 Freedman's Memorial to Abraham Lincoln (Emancipation Monument), one of the first memorials in Washington honoring Abraham Lincoln. It was dedicated on April 14, 1876, with an oration by Frederick Douglass. When installed it originally faced west, towards the U.S. Capitol, but in 1974 was repositioned east in order to face the Mary McLeod Bethune Memorial.
- Robert Berks's statue of Mary McLeod Bethune. It was unveiled on the 99th anniversary of her birth, July 10, 1974, before a crowd of over 18,000 people.

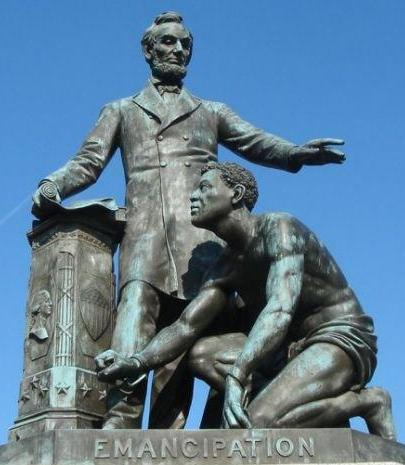
The Emancipation Memorial by Thomas Ball

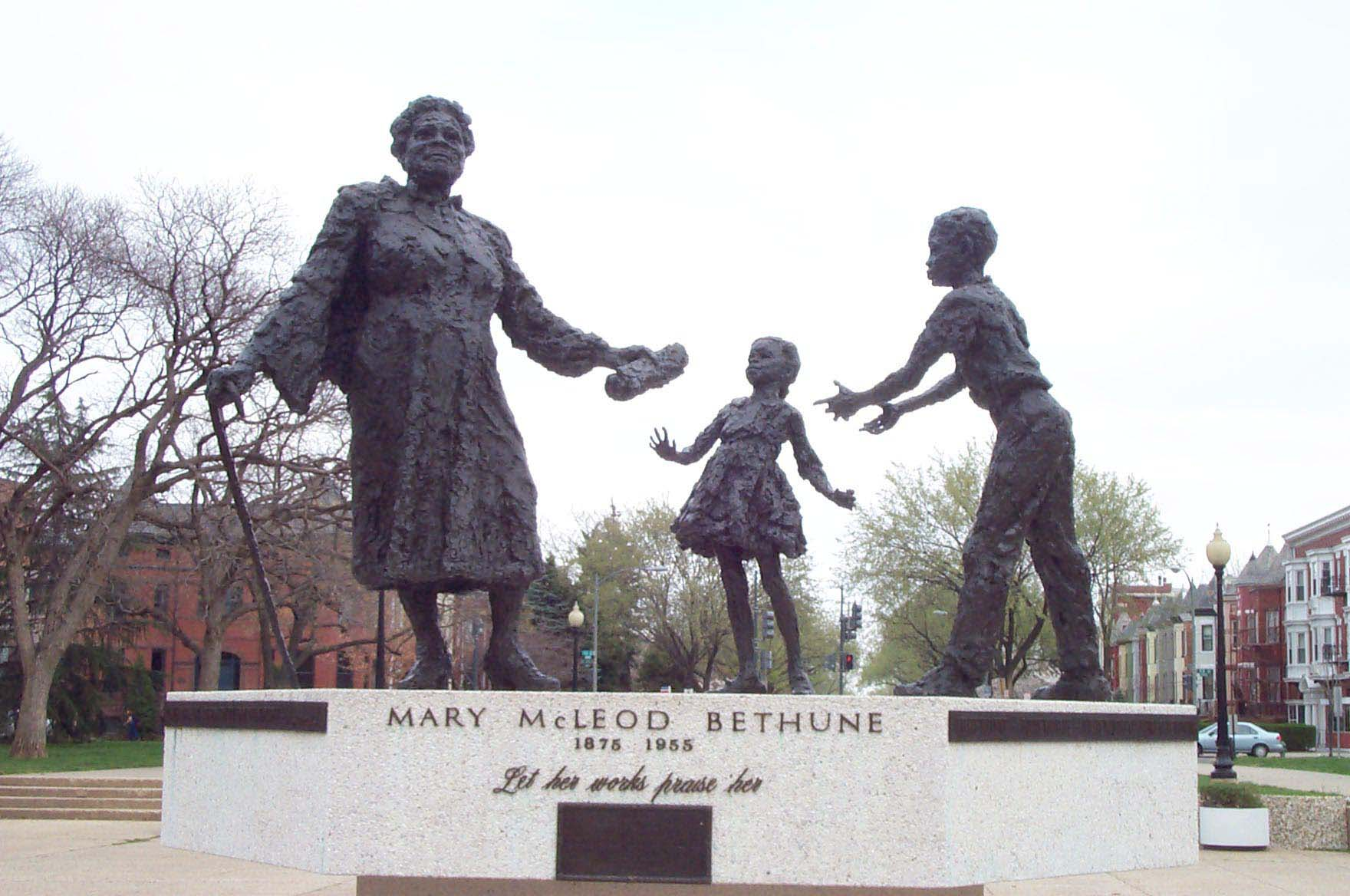
A larger-than-life-size statue of African American educator and activist Mary McLeod Bethune

== See also ==
- Washington, D.C., in the American Civil War
- Medicine in the American Civil War
- Armory Square Hospital
- Finley Hospital
- Harewood General Hospital
- Mount Pleasant General Hospital
- Abraham Lincoln
- Frederick Douglass
