= Harewood General Hospital =

Hospital in Washington D.C., US

- Part of military hospitals in the United States
- Washington, D.C.
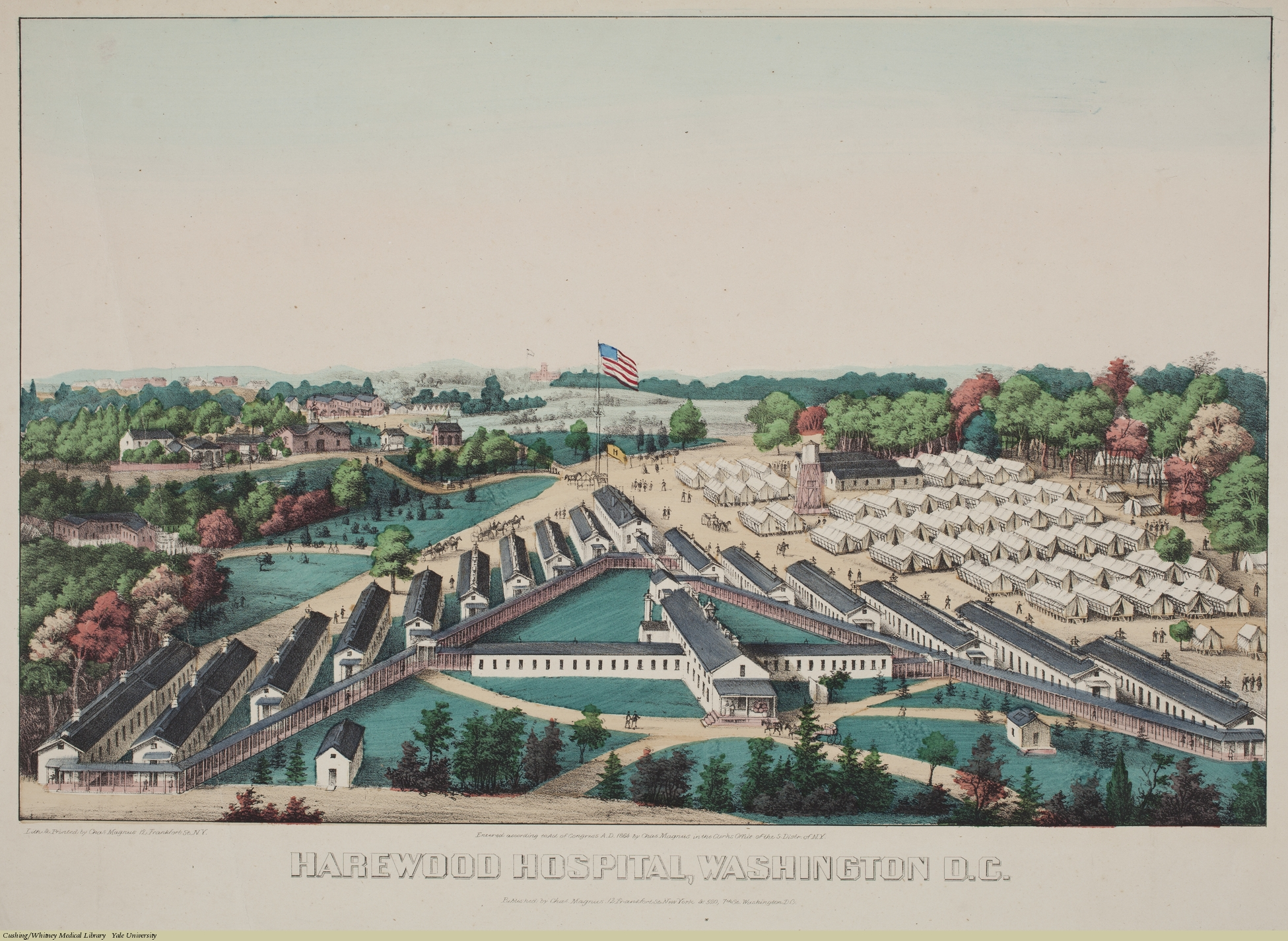
- Bird-eye view of Harewood Hospital

Site information
- Controlled by: Union Army

Location
- Coordinates: 38.928881°N 77.013559°W

Site history
- Built: 1862
- In use: 1862–1866
- Battles/wars: American Civil War

Harewood General Hospital was one of several purpose-built pavilion style hospitals operating in the Washington, D.C., area during the Civil War which rendered care to Union military personnel. A purpose-built pavilion style hospital, it was in use from September 4, 1862, to May 5, 1866.

== Location ==
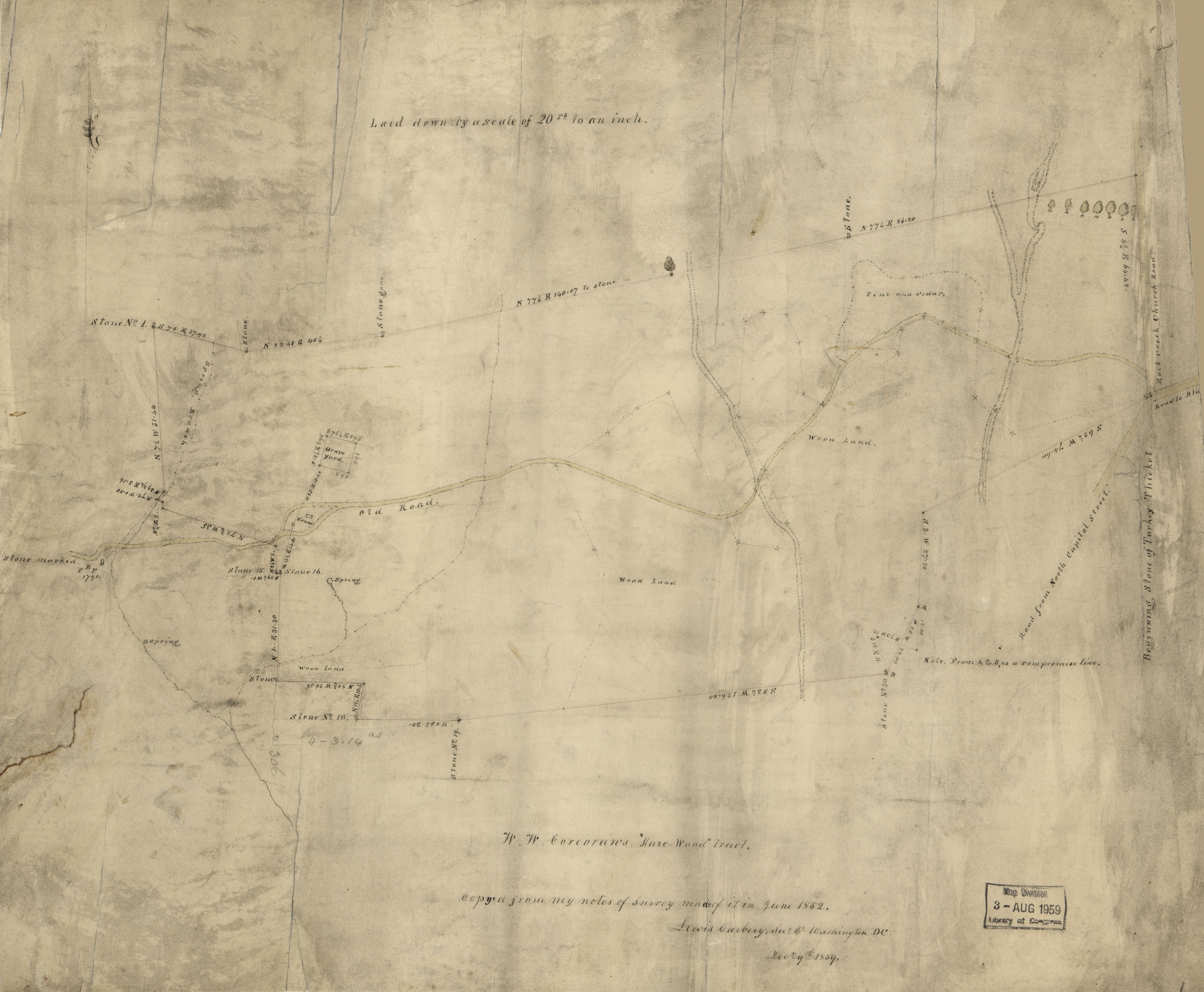
Corcoran's "Hare-Wood" tract

The hospital was located on land belonging to William W. Corcoran. It was named after the name (“Harewood”) of the tract of land upon which it was built.

It was located east of the 7th Street Turnpike (now Georgia Avenue NW) just north of the Glenwood Cemetery and south of the U.S. Military Asylium (today the Armed Forces Retirement Home). Today the land is home to other hospitals:

- MedStar Washington Hospital Center
- the Washington DC VA Medical Center
- Children's National Medical Center.

== History ==
Harewood Hospital opened on September 4, 1862, and operated until after the end of the Civil War, closing on May 5, 1866

It was located on the Corcoran Farm and built in a “V” pavilion style. The hospital was made up of nine wards of 63 beds each totaling 945 beds. Additional tents of six beds each were set up. With a maximum of 312 tents set up on site, the capacity of 1,872 beds was reached. The December 17, 1864, bed census lists that the hospital had 1,207 beds occupied of the 2,080 beds total. At the time, Surgeon R.A. Bontecon, U.S.V. was in charge. A few wooden barracks and a brick farm house were also part of the hospital complex.

=== Visits by notable figures ===
Among the notable figures who visited with and/or rendered care to sick and injured soldiers at Harewood Hospital were President Abraham Lincoln and his wife, Mary Todd Lincoln, and the American poet Walt Whitman.

"When President Lincoln and his family resided at the Soldiers' Home, they moved closer to the action of the Civil War, according to Erin Carlson Mast, executive director of President Lincoln's Cottage. "From greeting wounded soldiers en route to Harewood Hospital, to witnessing growing numbers of contraband camps and military burials, Lincoln’s life at the Soldiers’ Home connected him profoundly to the stark realities of the Civil War."

Whitman, who had heard that his brother had been wounded in battle but had found, after traveling from New York to Washington, D.C., that his brother had sustained only a minor injury, quickly realized that he could help other soldiers who were enduring far worse. After he began volunteering in city hospitals as part of the Christian Commission, one of the services he provided was to write letters on behalf of soldiers who were illiterate or too ill or injured to do so themselves. One of those letters — one of only three such examples of Whitman's "soldiers' letters" still known to still exist — was penned by the poet on January 21, 1866, to the wife and six children of a member of the 8th New Hampshire Infantry, Private Robert N. Jabo, who died from tuberculosis on December 19, 1866. It was discovered in February 2016 in the National Archives.

== Pictures ==
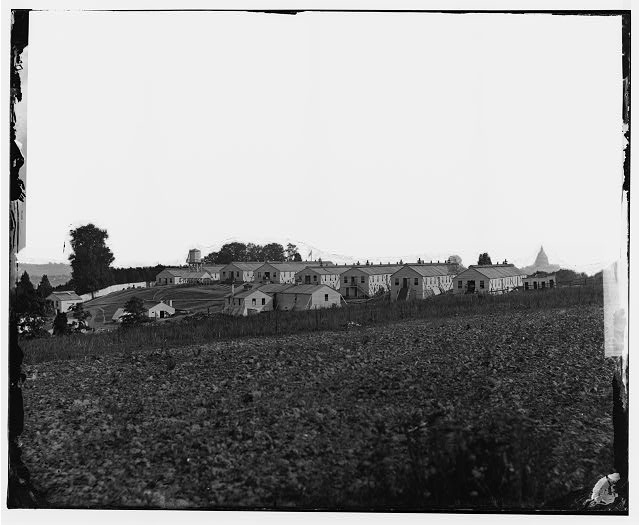
General view of Harewood Hospital

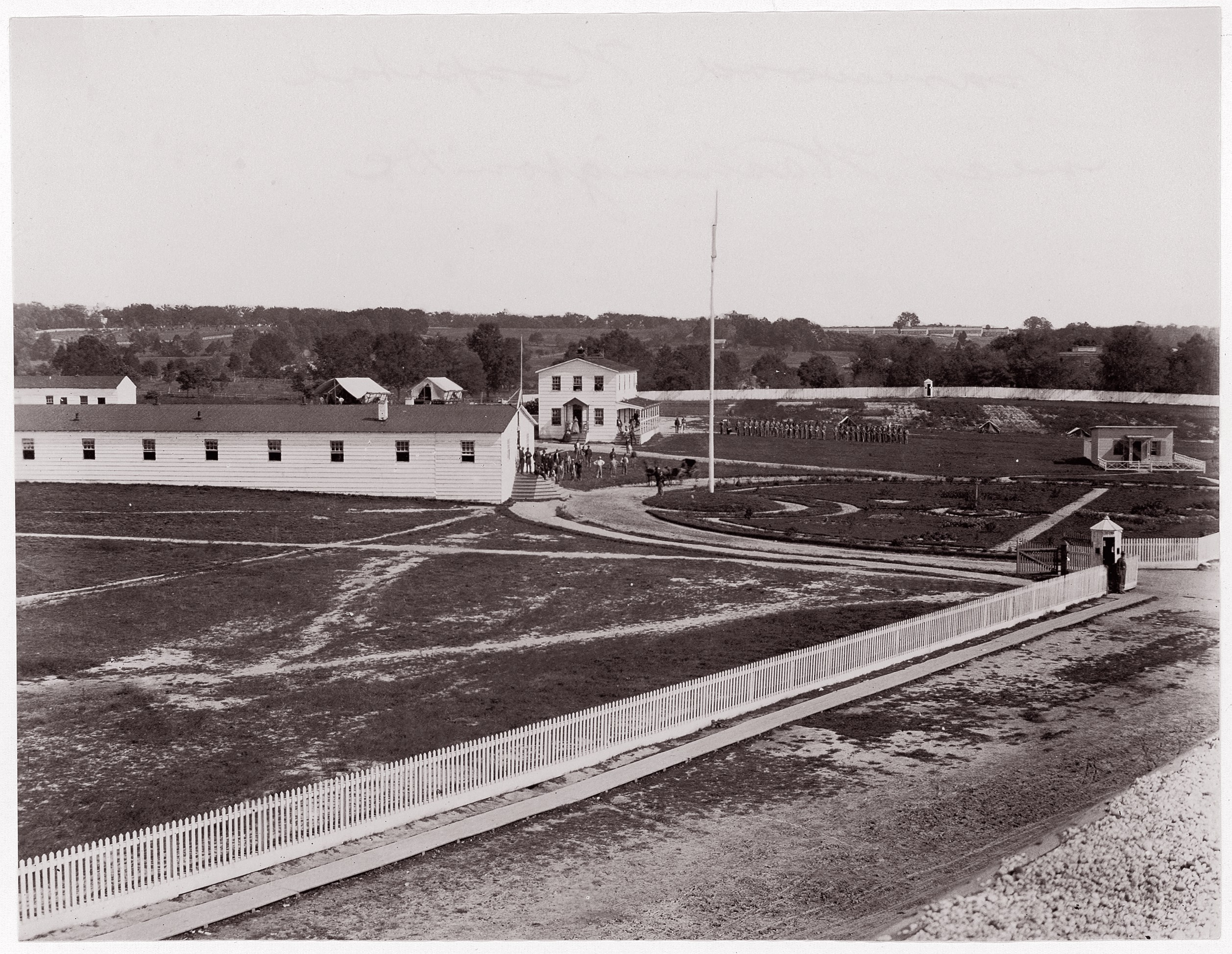
Harewood Hospital

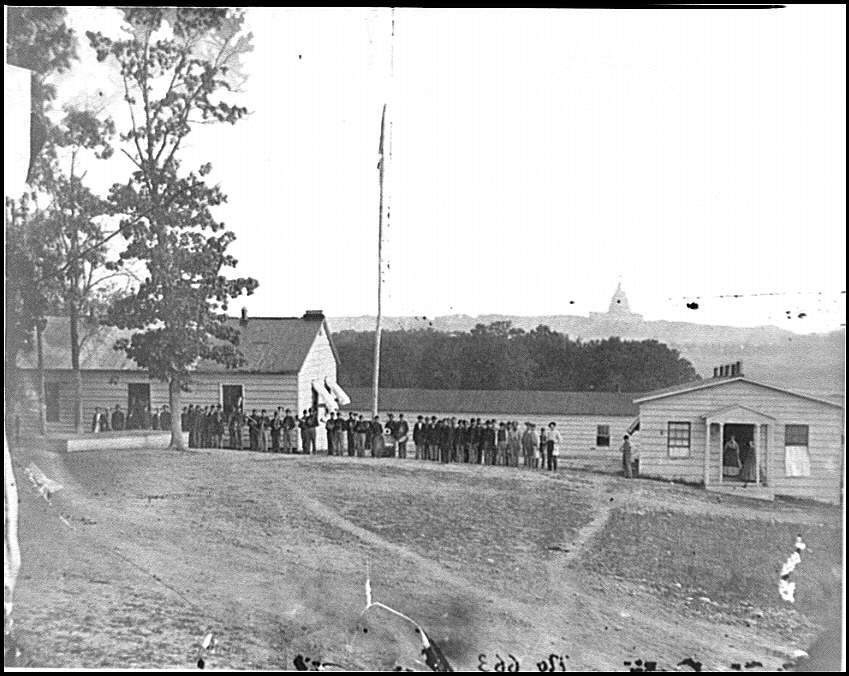
Band before officers' quarters at Harewood Hospital

Mess hall heated by elaborate stoves

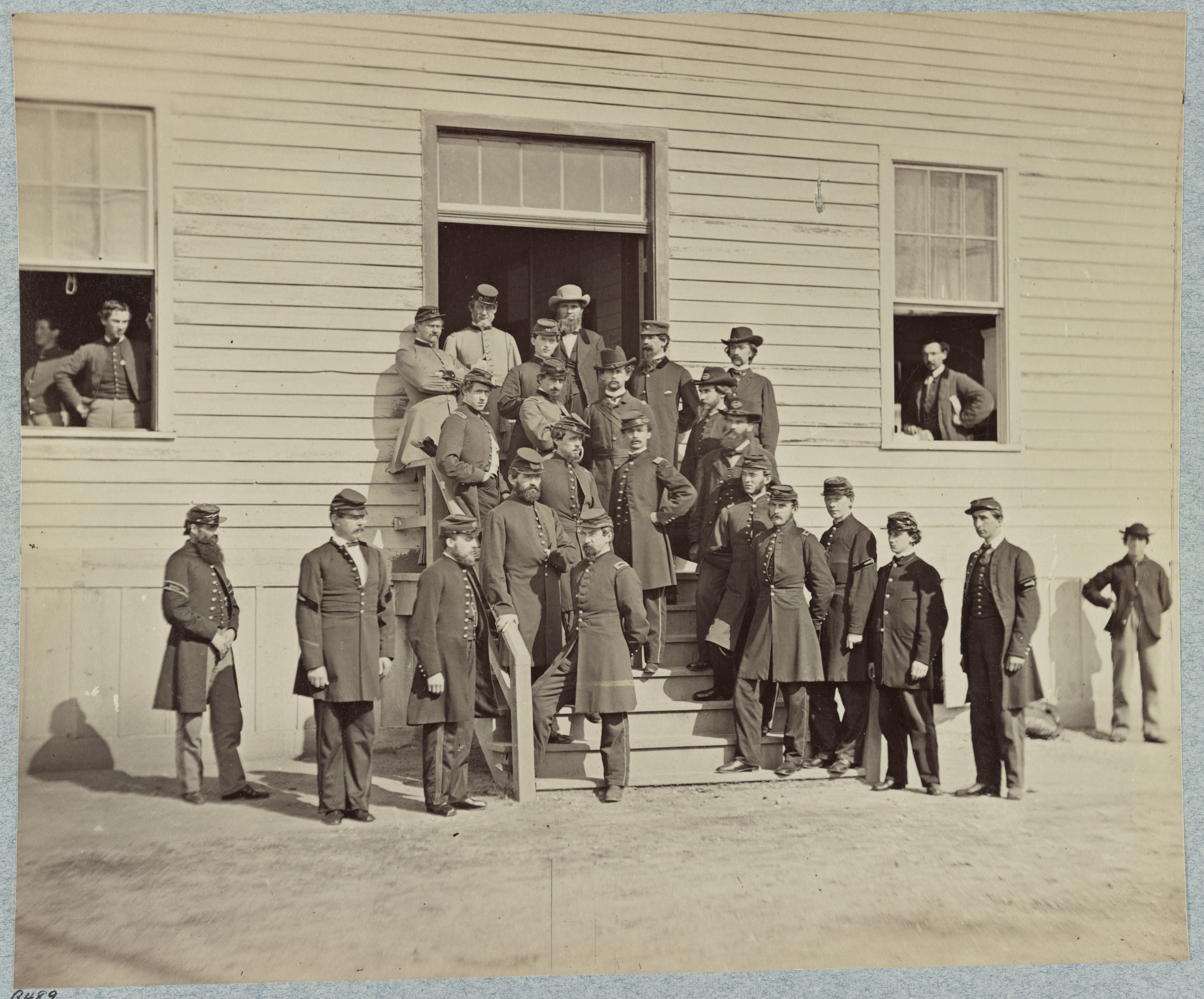
Surgeons and hospital stewards at Harewood Hospital

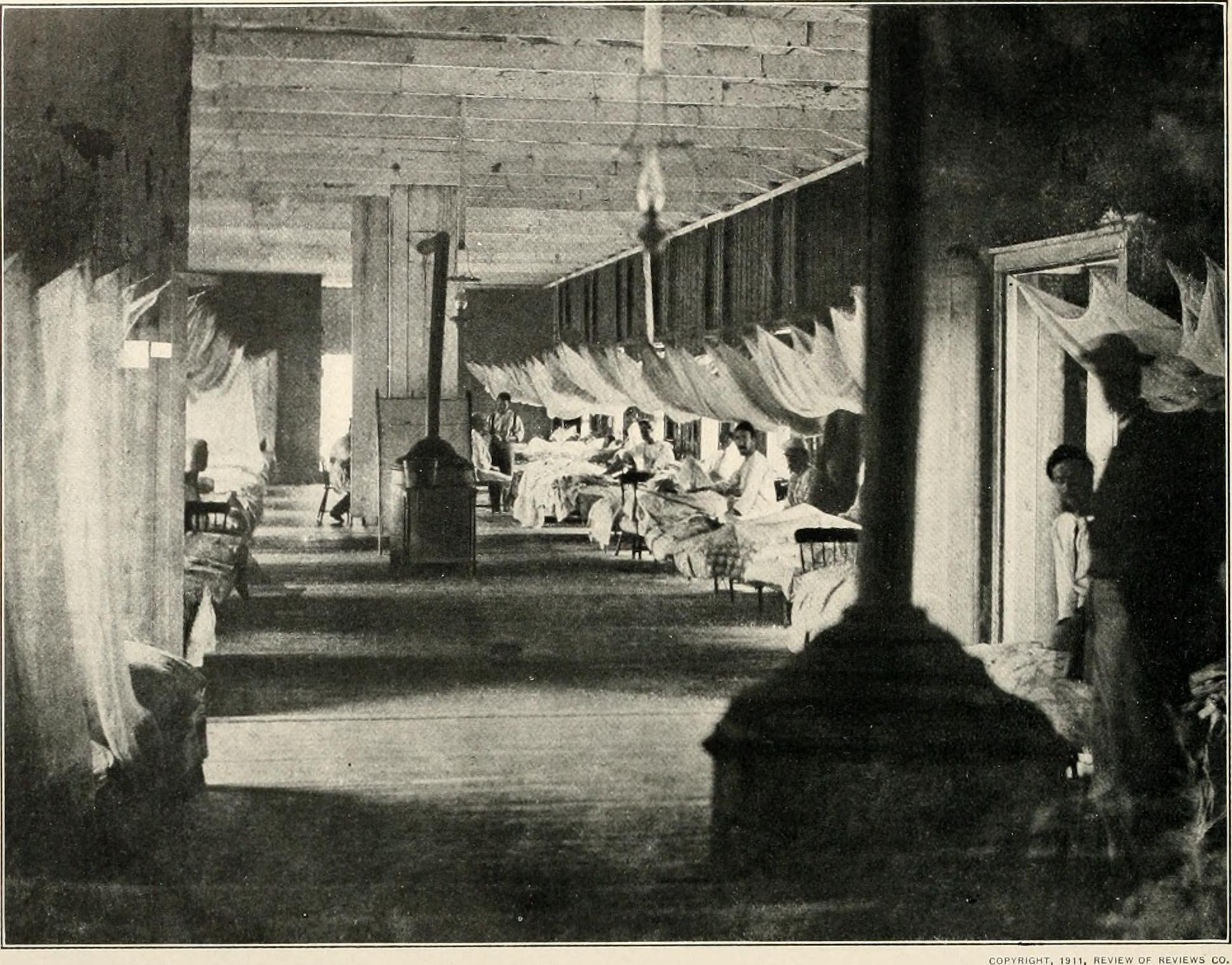
Interiors, 1864

== See also ==
- Washington, D.C., in the American Civil War
- Medicine in the American Civil War
- Washington, D.C., in the American Civil War
- Armory Square Hospital
- Finley Hospital
- Lincoln Hospital
- Mount Pleasant General Hospital
