= Belle Brezing =

American brothel keeper (1860–1940)

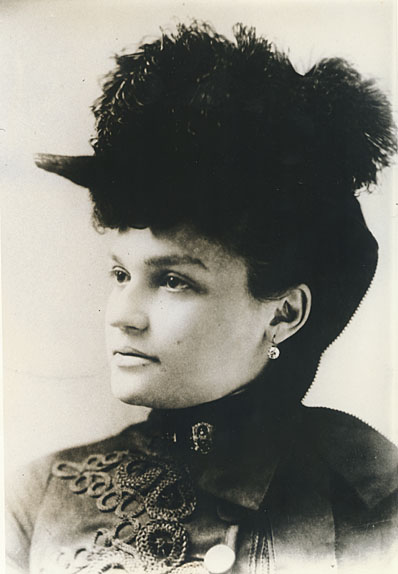
- Portrait of Belle Brezing c1895
- Born: Mary Belle Cox; June 16, 1860; Lexington, Kentucky, US
- Died: August 11, 1940 (aged 80); Lexington, Kentucky, US
- Resting place: Calvary Cemetery, Lexington
- Occupations: Prostitute; Brothel madam
- Years active: 1879–1917
- Spouse: James Kenney
- Partner: William "Billy" Mabon
- Children: Daisy May Kenney (b. 1876); Stillborn baby (1882)
- Mother: Sarah Ann Cox

Belle Brezing (June 16, 1860 – August 11, 1940) was a nationally known madam in Lexington, Kentucky at the end of the 19th century and into the beginning of the 20th. Her brothel was known as the "most orderly of disorderly houses".

== Early life ==
Belle Brezing was born Mary Belle Cox, the illegitimate daughter of Sarah Ann Cox. Sarah Cox was a dressmaker who also worked part-time as a prostitute. Sarah Cox subsequently married George Brezing, a saloon operative, grocer and alcoholic, in 1861, whose name Belle adopted.

At the age of 12, the age of consent at the time, Brezing was raped by Dionesio Mucci, a local merchant who was three times her age. In 1874, when Brezing was age 14, Mucci gave her a scrapbook, in which she started keeping magazine clippings, Valentine cards, and photographs—as well as a poem she composed, titled Kisses:

Sitting to night in my chamber,
a school girl figure and lonely,
I kiss the end of my finger.
that and that only.
Reveries rises from the smokey mouth
Memories linger surround me.
Boys that are married or single.
Gather around me. School boys in pantalets romping,
Boys that now are growing to be young lads,
Boys that like to be kissed, and like to give kisses.
Kisses—well I remember them;
Those in the corner were fleetest;
Sweet were those on the sly in the Dark were the sweetest
Girls are tender and gentle,
To woo was almost to win them.
They lips are good as ripe peaches, and cream for finger.
Girls are sometimes flirts, and coquettish;
Now catch and kiss if you can sin;
Could I catch both—ah, wasn't I a happy Girl,
Boys is pretty and blooming sweetly, yea
Sweetness over their rest
Them I loved dearly and truly, Last and the best.

The relationship with Mucci lasted two years, but Brezing had other lovers during this time, including cigar makers James Kenney and Johnny Cook.

Soon after her 15th birthday in 1875, Brezing became pregnant—possibly by Johnny Cook, but she had at least three lovers at this time. On September 14, 1875, when Brezing was three months pregnant, she married James Kenney, but never lived with him. After the wedding ceremony, she returned to her mother's house. Nine days later, Brezing wrote to Cook asking for a gun. Cook was found outside Brezing's house with a bullet in his skull. Mucci was allegedly the last person to see Cook alive. Kenney immediately left Lexington and didn't return for 10 years. The death was recorded as a suicide, but popular opinion was that Cook was murdered.

On March 14, 1876, Brezing gave birth to a daughter, Daisy May Kenney. In May of that year, Brezing's mother died of cancer. While at the funeral, her mother's landlord padlocked the house, leaving Brezing and her baby homeless. Brezing left her baby with a neighbor, with a promise to always provide for her, and she turned to prostitution.

Belle's first job in a brothel began December 24, 1879 in a house maintained by Jenny Hill, which has the distinction of being the former residence of First Lady Mary Todd Lincoln. Brezing quickly became the brothel's top earner and had bankers and politicians among her clients.

== Belle's "bawdy houses" ==
Gov. Blackburn's pardon of Belle's "bawdy house"

In July 1881, Brezing rented a house at 156 North Upper Street and opened her own brothel. Around this time, she arranged for her daughter Daisy May to be sent to an institution in Newport, Kentucky. Daisy May was mentally disabled and spent the rest of her life in institutions in Newport and Detroit. Brezing again became pregnant, but the baby was stillborn in July 1882.

Brezing was determined to make her brothel the finest in Lexington, with the best surroundings and entertainment. She made frequent trips to Cincinnati and New York City to buy linens, furnishings, and clothes for the brothel. She had many influential citizens among her clients, including bankers, businessmen and politicians. When arrested for keeping a "bawdy house" in December 1882, she received a pardon from Kentucky Governor Luke P. Blackburn.

Two years after starting her brothel, she saved enough money to buy a house, 194 North Upper Street. The brothel transferred to the new premises in July 1883. In the same year, she became attached to bookkeeper William "Billy" Mabon. The couple stayed together until his death.

On January 13, 1889, the Lexington Daily Press published a "Petition of Citizens" on the front page, which called for the closing of "houses of ill fame conducted by Belle Breezing at 194 North Upper Street; Lettie Powell, 196 N Upper Street; and Molly Parker, 154 N Upper Street."

With the help of Philadelphia millionaire William M Singerly, Brezing brought new premises at 153 Megowan Street (now 153 N. Eastern Ave) in the city's red-light district. The brothel quickly became established as one of the more stylish in the city. The house was badly damaged in a fire in 1895, but rebuilding started immediately. During the building works, an additional floor was added.

Brezing was known for her charity. When the local hospital had a fire, she bought all the bed linen locally and sent it to the hospital. A local prostitute, Debbie Harvey, was murdered in 1911. Brezing ensured she had a proper burial in Lexington Cemetery.

The Temperance Movement was gaining strength, and in 1915, it pressured the city commissioners into issuing an ordnance requiring brothels to close. Brezing and some other madams ignored the ordinance. When the US entered World War I in 1917, soldiers were stationed nearby, and the U.S. Army ordered the city to close the brothels. On February 16, 1917, Billy Mabon died, and by November of that year, Brezing closed the brothel.

== Retirement and death ==
Brezing continued to live in the premises until her death in 1940. Addicted to morphine, Brezing was attended to by her doctor Dr. C.A. Nevitt. She was diagnosed with uterine cancer in 1938, and she died on August 11, 1940. She was buried in Calvary Cemetery in Lexington. Her tombstone reads "Blessed Be the Pure in Heart". Time magazine published her obituary, calling her a "famed Kentucky bawd." The Lexington Herald published a front-page eulogy. Her estate was auctioned over several days. The house was converted into apartments, and in 1973 a fire consumed the upper floor. The remaining architectural details were auctioned. Bricks salvaged from the home were sold to the public with the inscription: "Brick from the Belle Brezing Home - The most orderly of Dis-orderly Homes".

== Gone with the Wind ==
Brezing is believed to have been the model for Belle Watling in Gone with the Wind. Margaret Mitchell allegedly heard about Brezing from her husband who previously lived in Lexington. Mitchell denied basing Watling on Brezing. The film adaptation was released six months before Brezing's death.

== Legacy ==
Still standing, one of her other former houses is on the campus of Transylvania University and houses a women's locker room.

Brezing is commemorated annually in Lexington by a bed race in April. Several of the city's streets are closed to make a course for the race.

Margaret C. Price wrote a play about Brezing, titled Belle Brezing. It was performed at the Lost Theatre in Los Angeles during the summer of 2008. In 2011, Lexington's Actors Guild Theatre presented the play. Laurie Genet Preston, the actress who played Brezing, previously played this role in a 2004 presentation of the play at the University of Kentucky.

Director and producer Doug High made a documentary about Brezing's life: Belle Brezing & the Gilded Age of the Bluegrass. The documentary was narrated by Elizabeth Shatner (wife of William Shatner), and Brezing again was played by Laurie Genet Preston. The film premiered at the Kentucky Theatre Lexington on February 16, 2017.

== Bibliography ==
- Boyd, Douglas A. (2011). Crawfish Bottom: Recovering a Lost Kentucky Community. University Press of Kentucky. ISBN 9780813140124.
- Holland, Jeffrey Scott; Moran, Mark; Sceurman, Mark (2008). Weird Kentucky: Your Travel Guide to Kentucky's Local Legends and Best Kept Secrets. Sterling Publishing Company, Inc. ISBN 9781402754388.
- Price, Margaret C. (2008). Belle Breezing. AuthorHouse. ISBN 9781438908274.
- Tattershall, Doug (2014). Belle Brezing: American Magdalene. Wind Publications. ISBN 9781936138685.
- Thompson, Buddy (1983). Madam Belle Brezing (2nd ed.). Buggy Whip Press. ISBN 978-0961282400.
- United States Congress (1992). Congressional Record: Proceedings and Debates of the ... Congress. U.S. Government Printing Office.
- Wall, Maryjean (2014). Madam Belle: Sex, Money, and Influence in a Southern Brothel. University Press of Kentucky. ISBN 9780813147079.
- Young-Brown, Fiona (2011). Wicked Lexington, Kentucky. Arcadia Publishing. ISBN 9781625841087.
