= Liberty Heights (disambiguation) =

Liberty Heights is a 1999 film by Barry Levinson.

Liberty Heights may also refer to:

- Liberty Heights, Lexington, a neighborhood in SE Lexington, Kentucky
- Liberty Heights, a neighborhood Lexington, Massachusetts
- Liberty Heights, Springfield, Massachusetts, a neighborhood
- Maryland Route 26, Liberty Heights Avenue in Baltimore, Maryland
