= Marietta Kies =

American philosopher (1853–1899)

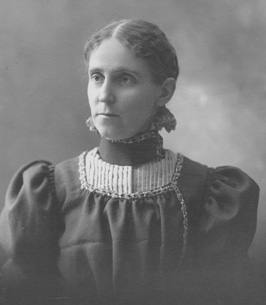
- Marietta Kies, c. 1881
- Born: December 31, 1853; Killingly, Connecticut, United States
- Died: July 20, 1899 (aged 45); Pueblo, Colorado, United States

Education
- Education: Mount Holyoke Seminary, (Bachelor's, 1881); University of Michigan (Master's, 1889; PhD, 1891)
- Thesis: The Ethical Principle and its Application to State Relations (1891)

Philosophical work
- School: St. Louis Hegelians
- Main interests: Idealism

Marietta Kies (December 31, 1853 – July 20, 1899) was an American philosopher and educator associated with the St. Louis Hegelians. She was the second American woman to receive a PhD in philosophy, after May Gorslin Preston Slosson (1858–1943), and taught full-time at a university.

== Life ==
Marietta Kies was born in Killingly, Connecticut, the second of five daughters of Miranda Young and William Knight Kies. She earned a bachelor's degree from Mount Holyoke Seminary in 1881. She studied there from 1881 to 1882 and, after teaching at Colorado College from 1882 to 1885, again from 1885 to 1891, focusing on philosophy of mind and moral philosophy. Kies belonged to the American idealist movement known as the St. Louis Hegelians, which developed in St. Louis in the 1860s after translations and interpretations of German philosophers such as Hegel, Fichte, and Schelling appeared.

From the mid-1880s, Kies studied under William Torrey Harris at the Concord School of Philosophy in Massachusetts. During this period, she edited Harris's lectures and essays on epistemology and metaphysics as An Introduction to the Study of Philosophy (1889). On Harris's recommendation, she then studied at the University of Michigan under George Sylvester Morris, Henry Carter Adams, and John Dewey. She received her master's degree in 1889 and her PhD in 1891, with a thesis titled The Ethical Principle and Its Application in State Relations.

From 1891 to 1892, Kies worked at Mills College in Oakland, California, where she was recruited to succeed President Susan Tolman Mills. Mills was dissatisfied with her teaching methods and dismissed her. After difficulty finding another college teaching position, Kies spent the academic year 1892–1893 studying in Leipzig and Zurich, a common route for academics of the period. She then became high school director in Plymouth, Massachusetts, and taught philosophy at Butler University in Indiana from 1896 to 1899.

Kies died of tuberculosis in Pueblo, Colorado, on July 20, 1899, aged 45.

== Philosophy ==
Kies published two works of political philosophy: The Ethical Principle and Its Application in State Relations (1892), based on her doctoral thesis, and Institutional Ethics (1894). In them, she contrasted "justice", or egoism, with "grace", or altruism, and argued that they could complement each other in society. Institutional Ethics was largely a revised version of the earlier work, with additions on school, family, jurisdiction, and the role of the church in society. According to Kies, both justice and grace had a place in economic and political decision-making, but grace should have a more central role and should also be enforced by the state. As a Christian socialist, Kies supported welfare programmes intended to address poverty.

Kies also addressed women's issues. She revised Hegel's view of the family by asserting the individuality of women within the household, where Hegel had treated unity rather than individuality as paramount. Since women were already more involved in public life in the late 19th century, she saw no need for women to remain private, subjective, and fully occupied with the roles of wives and mothers, or to become fully involved in political life. She held that women should have voting rights in areas they believed directly affected them, such as education, public health, and labour law.

== Publications ==
- The Ethical Principle and its Application to State Relations. Island Press / Register Pub. Co., Ann Arbor 1892 (also Ph. D. thesis, University of Michigan 1891).
- Institutional Ethics. Allyn & Bacon, Boston 1894.
