= Robert Smith Todd =

American lawyer, businessman, and politician (1791–1849)

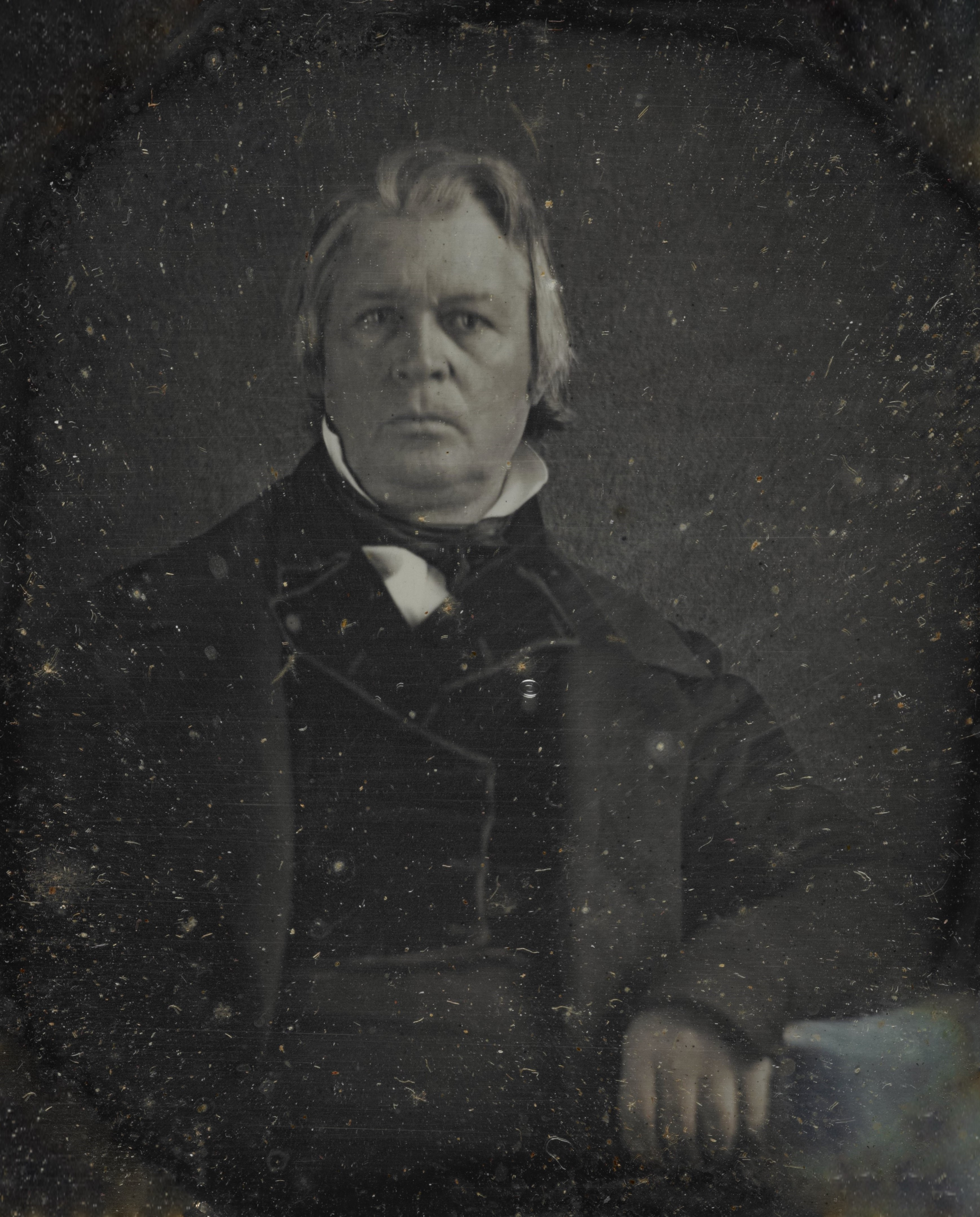
- Undated daguerreotype of Todd

Member of the Kentucky Senate for Fayette County
- In office 1848–1849

Personal details
- Born: February 25, 1791 Lexington, Kentucky, U.S.
- Died: July 17, 1849 (aged 58) Liberty Heights, Kentucky, U.S.
- Party: Whig
- Spouses: Elizabeth Parker (m. 1812; died 1825) Elizabeth Humphreys (m. 1826)
- Relations: John Todd (uncle); Robert Todd (uncle)
- Children: 16, including Mary
- Parent(s): Levi Todd; Jane Briggs Todd
- Education: Transylvania College

Military service
- Allegiance: United States
- Branch/service: United States Army
- Years of service: 1811–1815
- Rank: Private; Captain
- Unit: 5th Kentucky Regiment
- Battles/wars: War of 1812; Battle of Frenchtown; Battle of the Thames

Robert Smith Todd (February 25, 1791 – July 17, 1849) was an American lawyer, soldier, banker, businessman and politician. He was the father of First Lady Mary Todd Lincoln.

== Early life ==
Todd was born on February 25, 1791, in Lexington, a year before Kentucky became a state. He was the third of six sons born to Gen. Levi Todd (1756–1807) and Jane (née Briggs) Todd (1761–1800). A year after his mother's death in 1800, his father remarried to Jane Holmes. Among the eleven children his father had between his two wives, was sister Jane Todd, who married congressman Daniel Breck.

A source of much family pride, his father fought in the American Revolutionary War under the command of Brigadier General George Rogers Clark. After the War, his father and his uncles, John and Robert Todd, helped found present-day Lexington and became leading landowners and prominent statesmen in the state of Kentucky prior to its admission into the United States in 1792. Through his brother, Dr. John Todd, he was the uncle of U.S. Representative and Union General John Blair Smith Todd.

When only fourteen years old, Todd began attending Transylvania College in Lexington, graduating four years later when he was eighteen.

== Career ==
Todd studied law, first by apprenticing in the office of Thomas Bodley, the clerk of Fayette County (and a cousin by marriage of his first wife, Eliza), and second with prominent jurist George Bibb, the chief justice of the Kentucky Court of Appeals (later a U.S. Senator and U.S. Secretary of the Treasury in the 1840s). He was admitted to the bar on September 28, 1811, however, Todd never practiced, instead, choosing to go into business.

=== Military service ===
Even before what became known as the War of 1812 started, Todd was active in a militia company that eventually merged into the Lexington light artillery of the 5th Kentucky Regiment. In the winter of 1811 to 1812, he asked to be recommended for a commission from Senator Henry Clay through Parker family members. In July 1812, when the 5th Kentucky Regiment left Lexington, it contained Robert, three of his brothers, and eight Todd cousins. Initially, Todd himself did not receive his officer commission, although his two older brothers did, so along with his younger brother Samuel, he enlisted as a private. Before he could leave Ohio though, he caught pneumonia and had to stay there to recover. After recovering (and during which time he returned home to marry Eliza Parker), he went to the Front and fought in the Battle of Frenchtown in Michigan in January 1813 and later, the Battle of the Thames (where Tecumseh died) in the fall of 1813. Before the War ended, he was promoted to captain.

=== Business and politics ===
After the War ended, Todd began running a dry goods store with his partner, Bird Smith, and frequently traveled to New Orleans to buy French brandies, Dutch gin, and green coffee, which they sold in Lexington and Todd used to entertain many prominent friends with at his home. He later became a partner in a cotton factory in Fayette County and by 1835, he served as president of the Lexington branch of the Bank of Kentucky. In 1827, he was appointed a trustee to his alma mater, Transylvania University, alongside Henry Clay and Charles A. Wickliffe.

A close friend of John J. Crittenden, (Note: Robert's cousin, John Harris Todd (1795–1824), a son of Supreme Court Justice Thomas Todd, was married to Maria Knox Innes (a daughter of Harry Innes). After John Harris Todd's death in 1824, Maria married Robert's close friend, and fellow widower, John J. Crittenden in 1826, two weeks after Robert's second marriage. Crittenden was the Secretary of State of Kentucky in the 1830s and later, after Todd's death, he served as Governor of Kentucky, U.S. Attorney General, a U.S. Representative and a U.S. Senator.) he was also involved in local politics as a justice of the peace and sheriff. Todd spent over twenty years working as the clerk of the Kentucky House of Representatives in Frankfort, Kentucky, before he was later elected as a Whig to the state assembly (for three terms) then to a single term in the Kentucky Senate in 1848.

== Personal life ==
On November 13, 1812, Todd was married to his second cousin, Elizabeth "Eliza" Parker (1794–1825). Eliza was the daughter of Robert Porter Parker, a prominent landowner and merchant who had died in 1800. Eliza's mother, Elizabeth Rittenhouse (née Porter) Parker, a daughter of Col. Andrew Porter did not remarry prior to her death in 1850. (Note: Eliza's mother, Elizabeth Rittenhouse (née Porter) Parker was a half-sister of David Rittenhouse Porter (1788–1867), a governor of Pennsylvania, George Bryan Porter (1791–1834), a governor of the Michigan Territory, and James Madison Porter (1793–1862), a U.S. secretary of war under President John Tyler.) Together, Eliza and Robert were the parents of seven children, six of whom survived to maturity, before her death in 1825, from complications during George's birth. Their children were:

- Elizabeth Todd (1813–1888), who married Ninian Edwards Jr., the son of the Illinois Governor Ninian Edwards.
- Levi Oldham Todd (1816–1864), who married Louise Searle and remained in Lexington until his death.
- Frances Jane Todd (1817–1899), who married Dr. William Smith Wallace.
- Mary Ann Todd (1818–1882), who married Abraham Lincoln, later the 16th President of the United States.
- Ann Maria Todd Smith (1820–1891), who married Clark Moulton Smith, a successful merchant.
- Robert Parker Todd (1821–1822), who died in infancy.
- George Rogers Clark Todd (1825–1900), a surgeon who served in a Confederate hospital in South Carolina.

Six months after the death of his first wife, he proposed to Elizabeth "Betsy" Humphreys, and they married on November 1, 1826. Betsy was the daughter of Dr. Alexander Humphreys and Mary (née Brown) Humphreys. Her maternal uncle was John Brown. (Note: Betsy's uncle, John Brown, was a U.S. Representative and U.S. Senator from Kentucky who served as President pro tempore of the U.S. Senate. He was the father of Mason Brown (1799–1867), the Secretary of State of Kentucky, and Orlando Brown (1801–1867), the publisher and historian, both first cousins of Betsy.) Together, Betsy and Robert were the parents of nine additional children, eight of whom survived to maturity:

- Robert Humphrey Todd (1827–1827), who died in infancy.
- Margaret Todd (1828–1904), who married Charles Henry Kellogg.
- Samuel Brown Todd (1830–1862), a Confederate soldier who was killed on the second day of the Battle of Shiloh.
- David Humphreys Todd (1832–1871), a commandant of the Richmond prisons and served in the 21st Louisiana Infantry Regiment.
- Martha Todd (1833–1868), who married C. B. White of Alabama.
- Emilie Pariet Todd (1836–1930), who married Confederate Gen. Benjamin Hardin Helm, and son of the Kentucky Governor John L. Helm.
- Alexander Humphreys Todd (1839–1862), a Confederate soldier killed at the Battle of Baton Rouge.
- Elodie Breck Todd (1840–1877), who married Brig. General Nathaniel Henry Rhodes Dawson, later the third U.S. Commissioner of Education.
- Catherine Bodley Todd (1841–1875), who married William Wallace Herr.

In 1832, Todd purchased a three-story, fourteen room, brick residence at 578 West Main Street in Lexington. The new Todd family home was built c. 1803 – c. 1806 as an inn and tavern and known as "The Sign of the Green Tree". Today, the home has been preserved and is known as the Mary Todd Lincoln House.

Todd died suddenly from cholera on July 17, 1849, aged 58, in Liberty Heights, a neighborhood in Lexington.
