= Nathaniel H. R. Dawson =

American politician

Nathaniel Dawson
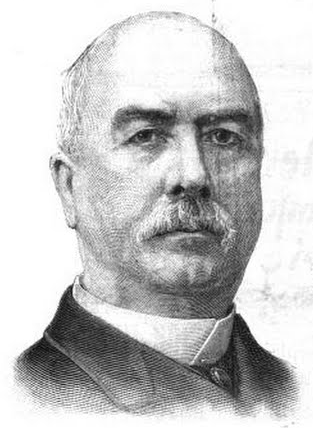

3rd United States Commissioner of Education
- In office August 6, 1886 – September 3, 1889
- President: Grover Cleveland; Benjamin Harrison
- Preceded by: John Eaton
- Succeeded by: William Harris

Personal details
- Born: Nathaniel Henry Rhodes Dawson; February 14, 1829; Charleston, South Carolina, U.S.
- Died: February 1, 1895 (aged 65); Selma, Alabama, U.S.
- Political party: Democratic
- Spouse(s): Anne Mathews (m. 1852; died 1855) Mary Tarver (m. 1857; died 1860) Elodie Breck Todd (m. 1862; died 1877)
- Children: 4

Military service
- Allegiance: United States; Confederate States
- Branch/service: United States Army; Confederate States Army
- Rank: Colonel
- Unit: 4th Alabama Infantry
- Battles/wars: American Civil War

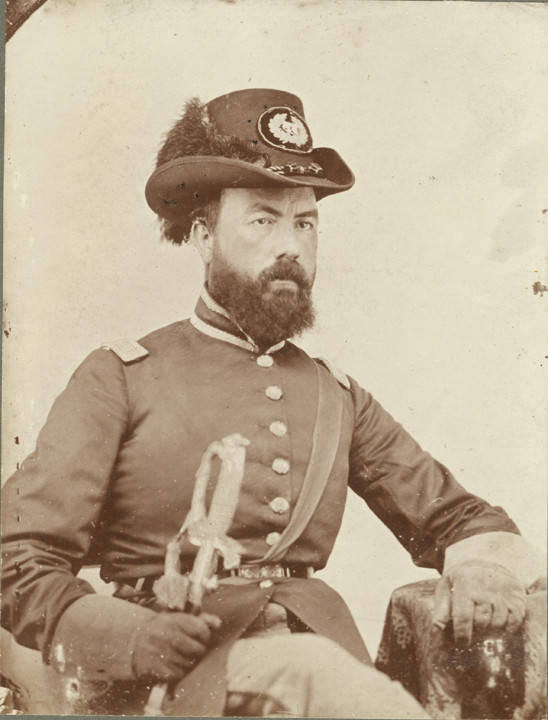
Dawson as a captain of the Selma Independent Blues, which later became part of the 4th Alabama Infantry

Nathaniel Henry Rhodes Dawson (February 14, 1829 – February 1, 1895) was an American lawyer and politician who served as the 3rd U.S. Commissioner of Education. During the American Civil War, he served in the Confederate Army as a colonel.

== Early life ==
Dawson was born in Charleston, South Carolina, on February 14, 1829. He was the eldest son of Lawrence Edwin Dawson (1799–1849) and Mary Wilkinson (née Rhodes) Dawson (1808–1851). His father, a close friend of William Drayton, had studied law at the Litchfield Law School in Connecticut. He practiced in South Carolina, where he was elected and served as a member of the state legislature several times.

Among Dawson's siblings were brother Reginald Hebner Dawson, a lawyer who fought with the 13th Alabama Regiment of the Confederate States Army; Mary Huger Dawson, who married C. M. Lide; and Lawrence E. Dawson Jr., who was a planter near Camden, Arkansas.

Dawson's paternal grandparents were John Dawson, the former mayor of Charleston, and Mary (née Huger) Dawson, a daughter of John Huger. He had also served as mayor of Charleston. The Dawson immigrant ancestors came from Westmorland in England and immigrated to the Province of South Carolina around 1750. Dawson's great-grandfather settled in Charleston and became a successful and wealthy merchant.

His maternal grandparents were Nathaniel Henry Rhodes and Mary Wilkinson (née Hamilton) Rhodes. She was a daughter of Paul Hamilton, the former Governor of South Carolina and U.S. Secretary of the Navy during the War of 1812 under James Madison. After his grandfather's death, his grandmother Mary remarried to Richard Bedon Screven. Dawson was also a lineal descendant of Nathaniel Johnson, a former British Member of Parliament, who served as the 14th colonial governor of South Carolina.

In 1842, his family moved from Charleston to Dallas County, Alabama. Dawson was educated at local private academies before he attended St. Joseph's College in Mobile, Alabama.

== Career ==
After St. Joseph's, he began the study of law in the office of his father near Selma. After his father's death in 1849, he joined the office of Judge George R. Evans in Cahaba, Alabama, and was admitted to practice in 1851. In 1857, after his second marriage, Dawson moved to Selma, where practiced in partnership with Edmund Pettus (later a U.S. Senator) and C. C. Pegues of Cahaba.

In 1855, Dawson was a Democratic candidate for the Alabama legislature, but lost his race by a few votes. In April 1860, he was a delegate to the Democratic National Convention in Charleston, which adjourned in deadlock without choosing candidates for president and vice president, leading the Alabama delegation to withdraw from the convention. He was among the Alabama delegates who reconvened at the Maryland Institute in Baltimore in June 1860 and selected then vice president John C. Breckinridge (for president) and U.S. Senator Joseph Lane (for vice president) in what was referred to as the “Breckinridge Democrats” convention.

=== U.S. Civil War ===
Upon the secession of Alabama in January 1861, Dawson was chosen as captain of the Selma Cadets and traveled to Virginia as a part of the 4th Alabama Infantry. From 1863 to 1864, and until the end of the war in 1865, he commanded a battalion of cavalry. During the War, he was elected to the lower house of the General Assembly of the Confederate States Congress in 1863 and 1864, serving in the Assembly and then returning to his command at the close of the legislative sessions.

=== Post war career ===
After the war, Dawson resumed his law practice in Selma with Gen. Pettus under the name Pettus & Davis. He took an active part in southern politics and in 1872, he was a presidential elector. In 1876, he was appointed one of the trustees of the Alabama common school system (later the University of Alabama) by Gov. George S. Houston, serving until his death in 1895. He was a member of the Democratic Executive Committee of Alabama for ten years and from 1884 to 1886, he served as chairman of the committee.

In 1880, Dawson was elected to the Alabama House of Representatives, and was chosen Speaker of the House from 1880 to 1881. In 1882, he was put forth as a candidate for governor of Alabama during the Democratic state convention, but he was defeated by Gen. Edward A. O'Neal who later won and became the 26th governor of the state. In 1886, Dawson was again put forth for the gubernatorial nomination among three other candidates: Henry Clayton, John McKluat, and Thomas Seay. Although he led in the convention from the start, Seay gained the nomination and was later elected as the 27th governor.

In August 1886, President Grover Cleveland appointed Dawson as the 3rd United States Commissioner of Education, succeeding former Union Army general and ordained Presbyterian minister, John Eaton, who served under Presidents Grant, Hayes, Garfield, Arthur, and Cleveland. Dawson had managed Cleveland's Alabama campaign in 1884. In April 1887, Columbia College, conferred upon Dawson the honorary degree of Doctor of Letters in token of his "efficient services to the cause of education." After the inauguration of President Benjamin Harrison in March 1889, he offered his resignation, which Harrison accepted months later, serving until September 3, 1889, when he was succeeded by Connecticut educator and philosopher William Torrey Harris.

After he left the Education Department, he again returned to the practice of law until August 1892, when he was again elected to the Alabama House, taking his seat in the assembly for the third time as one of the members from Dallas County.

== Personal life ==
On January 22, 1852, Dawson was married to Anne Eliza Mathews (1833–1855), a daughter of Joel Early Mathews, the owner of the Mathews cotton mill in Selma. Together, they were the parents of one daughter:

- Elizabeth Mathews Dawson (1855–1902), who married Dr. John Perkins Furniss (1841–1909).

After her death in 1855, he remarried to Mary Elizabeth Tarver (1833–1860) on June 17, 1857. Together, Nathaniel and Mary were the parents of:

- Mary Tarver Dawson (1860–1939), who married Jefferson Davis Jordan (1853–1915).

After the death of his second wife in 1860, Dawson married for the third time to Elodie Breck Todd (1840–1877) on May 15, 1862. Elodie was the daughter of Kentucky merchant and politician Robert Smith Todd and his second wife, Elizabeth (née Humphreys) Todd. Elodie was the granddaughter of Gen. Levi Todd and Dr. Alexander Humphreys and grandniece of U.S. Senator John Brown. Among Elodie's large family was her elder half-sister, Mary Todd Lincoln, the wife of U.S. President Abraham Lincoln. Together, they were the parents of:

- Nathanial Henry Rhodes Dawson Jr. (1864–1903), who did not marry and was educated at the University of Alabama.
- Lawrence Percy Dawson (1869–1925), the Sheriff of Dallas County, who married his first cousin, Alice Kellogg (1874–1913), a daughter of Margaret (née Todd) Kellogg.

Elodie, his third wife, died giving birth to a stillborn baby boy in 1877. Dawson died at his home on February 1, 1895, in Selma, Alabama. He was buried at Old Live Oak Cemetery in Selma.

Political offices
Preceded by John Eaton	United States; Commissioner of Education; 1886–1889	Succeeded by William T. Harris
