= Mary Todd Lincoln House =

Historic house in Kentucky, United States

- U.S. National Register of Historic Places
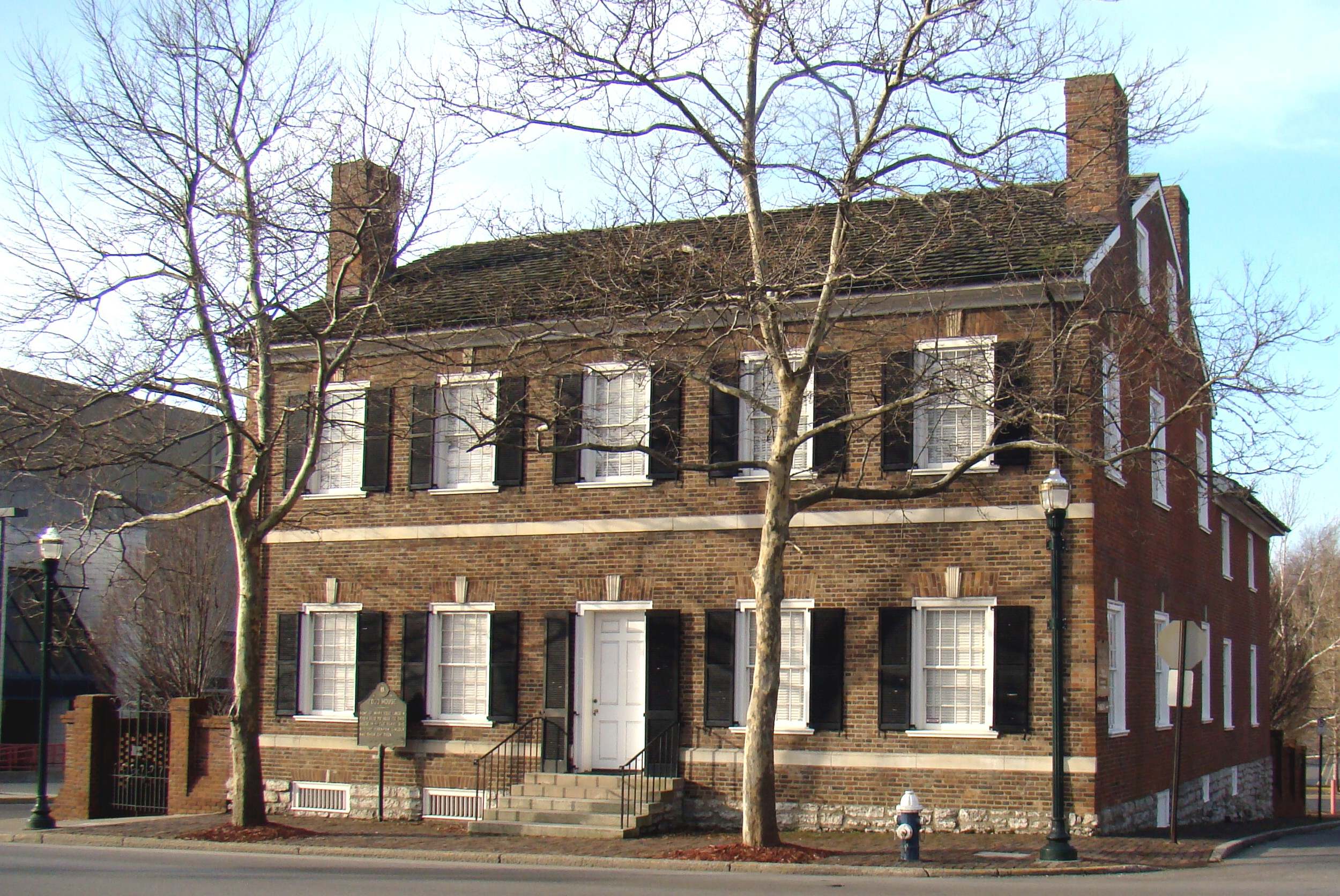

- Location within Kentucky Location within the United States
- Location: 578 West Main Street, Lexington, Kentucky
- Coordinates: 38°3′4.87″N 84°30′10.03″W
- Built: 1806
- Architectural style: Georgian
- NRHP reference No.: 71000341
- Added to NRHP: August 12, 1971

Mary Todd Lincoln House in Lexington, Kentucky, USA, was the girlhood home of Mary Todd, the future first lady and wife of the 16th President, Abraham Lincoln. Today the fourteen-room house is a museum containing period furniture, portraits, and artifacts from the Todd and Lincoln families. The museum introduces visitors to the complex life of Mary Todd Lincoln, from her refined upbringing in a wealthy, slave-holding family to her reclusive years as a mourning widow.

The house was built c. 1803–1806 as an inn and tavern, which was called "The Sign of the Green Tree" before its purchase by Mary's father, Robert Smith Todd, for the Todd family. The family moved into the three-story home in 1832. Mary Todd lived in this home until 1839, when she moved to Springfield, Illinois. After their marriage Mr. and Mrs. Lincoln visited her family here.

== Historic status ==
The Mary Todd Lincoln house has the distinction of being the first historic site restored in honor of a First Lady. Operated by the Kentucky Mansions Preservation Foundation, Inc., the house museum was opened to the public on June 9, 1977.

== Museum ==
In the mid-1970s, Beula C. Nunn, wife of Governor Louie B. Nunn, along with the Kentucky Mansions Preservation Foundation, Inc., and the Metropolitan Women's Club of Lexington, gained support to preserve and restore the Mary Todd Lincoln House. In June 1996, the Beula C. Nunn Garden at the Mary Todd Lincoln House was dedicated and opened to the public. Today the enclosed gardens contain trees, plants, herbs and shrubs that represent what may have been in the gardens at the Todd home in the early nineteenth century.

The property is open to the public as a historic house museum.

== Unusual history ==
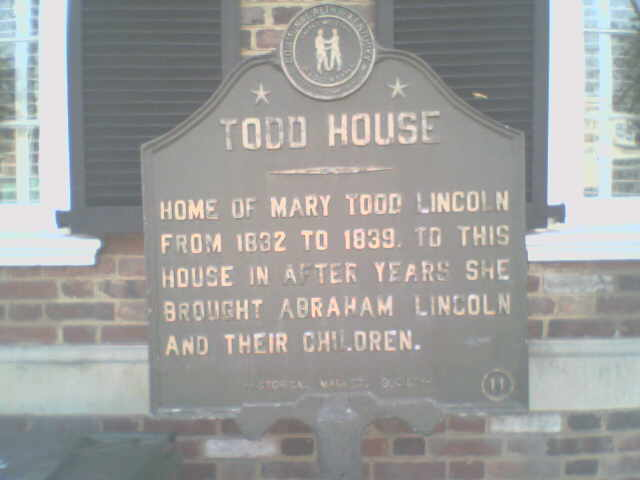

Belle Brezing was a working girl in a bawdy house, run by Jenny Hill, located in this building starting in 1879. Later she became a madam in her own right, with her own brothel. Brezing is widely credited as having inspired Margaret Mitchell's character of Belle Watling in her novel, Gone With The Wind (1936).

== See also ==
- Lexington in the American Civil War
