= St. Louis Hegelians =

The St. Louis Hegelians were a group of thinkers based in St. Louis, Missouri, who flourished in the 1860s. They were influenced by German idealism and Hegelianism. They were led by William Torrey Harris and Henry Conrad Brokmeyer were responsible for the publication of the Journal of Speculative Philosophy from 1867 to 1893, a non–theological organ which published an early essay on Friedrich Schiller written by Josiah Royce. Other members of the school included William McKendree Bryant and Thomas Davidson.

== Transcendentalism ==
Although influenced by contemporaneous American Transcendentalists, the St. Louis Hegelians viewed Transcendentalism in a mixed light. In the essay The Speculative, written by William Torrey Harris and published in the first issue of the Journal of Speculative Philosophy, Harris criticized Transcendentalism, claiming that the Transcendentalists had "truncated the dialectic" of the individual by focusing on individualism solely and not the "negative" element of a person's "interrelatedness with other individuals" in society.

== See also ==
- Anna Brackett, associate who later became the first woman principal of a teacher's college
- Marietta Kies, associate who was the second American woman to receive a PhD in philosophy
- Karl Rosenkranz
