= Alexander Humphreys =

American physician

- Born: 1757; County Armagh, Ireland
- Died: May 23, 1802 (aged 44–45); Staunton, Virginia, U.S.
- Education: University of Edinburgh
- Occupation: Physician
- Spouse: Mary Brown (m. 1788)
- Children: 7

Dr. Alexander Humphreys (1757 – May 23, 1802) was a pioneer Irish-American physician in Staunton, Virginia.

== Early life ==
He was born in County Armagh, Ireland, in 1757, the son of John Humphreys and Margaret Carlisle. He initially studied medicine under his uncle, Carlisle. After that, he attended the University of Edinburgh where he received his M.D. degree in 1782. At the time, the University of Edinburgh had the most famous medical school in the world.

== Life in America ==
In 1783, he emigrated to Augusta County, Virginia, and settled at Greenville near his brother, David Carlisle Humphreys. In 1787, he moved to Staunton and established a practice there. He became a Justice of Augusta County and a Trustee of the newly created Staunton Academy in 1792. In 1793, he became the President of the Board of Trustees of Staunton Academy.

Humphreys had a large and busy medical practice and attracted many medical students who studied under him as a preceptor. His known students include William Wardlaw, James McPheeters, Andrew Kean, William Henry Harrison, Samuel Brown, and Ephraim McDowell. William Henry Harrison later became President of the United States. Ephraim McDowell was the most famous student of Humphreys who became a practicing physician.

== Personal life ==
On April 8, 1788, Humphreys married Mary Brown, a daughter of Rev. John Brown of New Providence Church. Mary's brother was John Brown, a U.S. Representative and U.S. Senator from Kentucky who served as President pro tempore of the U.S. Senate (and the father of Mason Brown, the Secretary of State of Kentucky, and Orlando Brown, the publisher and historian). They had seven children including:

- Elizabeth L. Humphreys (1800–1874), who married Robert Smith Todd (1791–1849) and became the stepmother of Mary Todd Lincoln.

Humphreys died May 23, 1802, at Staunton, Virginia, and was buried in the churchyard of Trinity Episcopal Church at Staunton. His widow, Mary, then moved to Frankfort, Kentucky, to be near her brother John Brown. She died January 28, 1836, at Frankfort, Kentucky, and is buried at Frankfort Cemetery.
