= William Torrey Harris =

American philosopher

William Harris
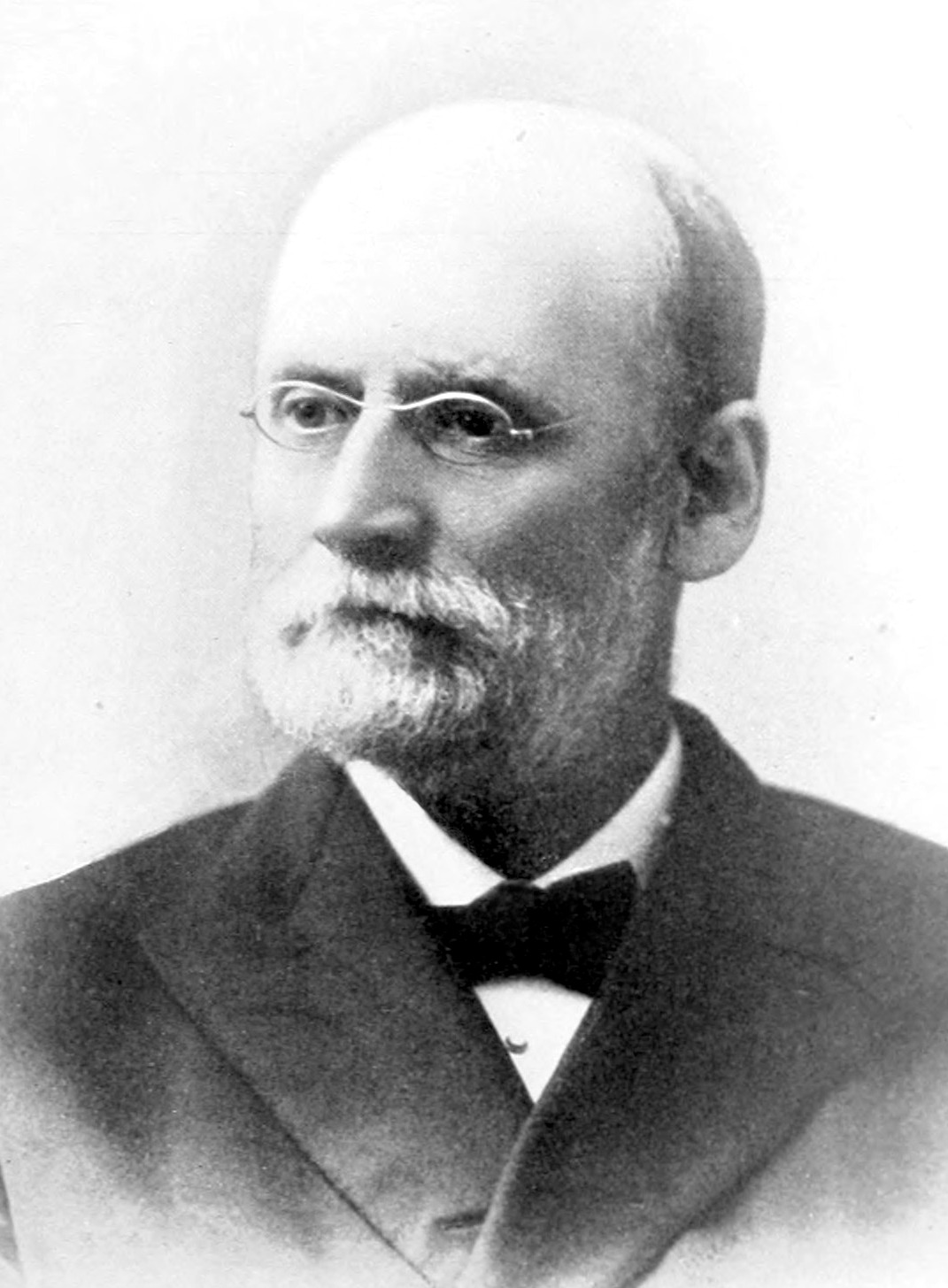

United States Commissioner of Education
- In office September 12, 1889 – June 30, 1906
- President: Benjamin Harrison; Grover Cleveland; William McKinley; Theodore Roosevelt
- Preceded by: Nathaniel Dawson
- Succeeded by: Elmer Brown

Personal details
- Born: September 10, 1835 North Killingly, Connecticut, U.S.
- Died: November 5, 1909 (aged 74) Providence, Rhode Island, U.S.
- Education: Yale University

William Torrey Harris (September 10, 1835 – November 5, 1909) was an American educator, philosopher, and lexicographer. He worked for nearly a quarter century in St. Louis, Missouri, where he taught school and served as Superintendent of Schools for twelve years. With Susan Blow, in 1873 he established the first permanent, public kindergarten in the country. He is also known for establishing high school as an integral part of public education.

Increasingly interested in Hegelian philosophy, he was cofounder of Journal of Speculative Philosophy (1867), the first philosophical journal in the US. He also worked with Amos Bronson Alcott's Concord School of Philosophy. In 1889 Harris was appointed as United States Commissioner of Education, and served in that role, under four presidents, until 1906.

== Early life ==
Born in 1835 in North Killingly, Connecticut, he attended Phillips Academy in Andover, Massachusetts. He completed two years at Yale College, then moved West.

== Career ==
Beginning at age 22, Harris taught school and made his career in St. Louis, Missouri, from 1857 to 1880, a period when the city was growing rapidly. It served both as a gateway to the West and as an industrializing city on the Mississippi River.

He served as Superintendent of Schools from 1868 to 1880, and had a strong influence on the system. With Susan E. Blow in this city, in 1873 he established America's first permanent public kindergarten. While in St. Louis, William Torrey Harris implemented many influential ideas to strengthen both the institution of the public school system and the basic philosophical principles of education.

His changes resulted in the expansion of the public school curriculum to include high school. He believed it was essential to growth of an individual and to meet new challenges of the industrial age. The expanded programs included art, music, and scientific and manual studies. He also encouraged all public schools to acquire libraries.

Harris's St. Louis schools were considered some of the best in the country. His fellow educators included many local farmers and tradesmen who were immigrants from German provinces after the revolutions of 1848. They had a strong belief in education.

In St. Louis, Harris met mechanic and philosopher Henry Clay Brockmeyer, a German immigrant whose influence turned him toward hegelianism. With Brockmeyer and other of the St. Louis Hegelians, Harris founded and edited the Journal of Speculative Philosophy (1867); it was the first philosophical periodical in the United States. He edited it until 1893. Its contributors promoted Hegel's concept of time and events as part of a universal plan, a working out of an eternal historical dialectic.

Harris returned to New England, where he was associated with Amos Bronson Alcott's Concord School of Philosophy in Massachusetts from 1880 to 1889.

In 1889 Harris was appointed as U.S. Commissioner of Education, serving under presidents Benjamin Harrison, Grover Cleveland, William McKinley and Theodore Roosevelt, until 1906. Harris worked to organize all phases of education on the principles of philosophical pedagogy as espoused by Hegel, Kant, Fichte, Fröbel, Pestalozzi and many others of idealist philosophies.

As US Commissioner of Education, Harris also strongly supported indoctrination, education and cultural assimilation of Native Americans. He wrote the introduction to the Bureau of Education Bulletin (No. 1, 1889) on "Indian Education", issued under Thomas Jefferson Morgan, Commissioner of Indian Affairs. Harris called for mandatory education of American Indians through a partnership with Christianity in order to promote industry. Harris called for the removal of Native children from their families for up to 10 years of training for the "lower form of civilization", as a way of assimilating Indians into "American" civilization. He believed this was necessary to save the race, who he believed had to shift from their traditional cultures.

Harris wrote,

"We owe it to ourselves and to the enlightened public opinion of the world to save the Indian, and not destroy him. We can not save him and his patriarchal or tribal institution both together. To save him we must take him up into our form of civilization. We must approach him in the missionary spirit and we must supplement missionary action by the aid of the civil arm of the State. We must establish compulsory education for the good of the lower race."

Harris died on November 5, 1909, in Providence, Rhode Island.

== Honors ==
Harris was awarded the honorary degree of LL.D. from various American and foreign universities, as he had an international reputation.

In 1906 the Carnegie Foundation for the Advancement of Teaching conferred upon him "as the first man to whom such recognition for meritorious service is given, the highest retiring allowance which our rules will allow, an annual income of $3000."

== Public issues ==
According to biographer Carl Byerly, Harris argued that the purpose of education In a democracy was:

- To achieve equality of opportunity
- Self-preservation of the state
- To teach morality and self-discipline
- To awaken powers of self-activity
- To develop directive power
- To maintain mobility of population
- To preserve and create property
- To give technical training
- To remain responsive to social change

Harris was a strong proponent of the American colonial projects in Cuba, Puerto Rico and the Philippines following the Spanish–American War. In an article entitled "An Educational Policy for Our New Possessions", Harris wrote:

If the other people of the world to the number of some fourteen hundred millions are united under the five great powers of Europe, while we in turn have only one hundred millions, our national idea will be threatened abroad and have more dangers than ever at home....We must accept the charge of as many of these colonies as come to our hand. We must seek to give them civilization in the highest sense that we can conceive of it....The highest ideal of a civilization is that of a civilization that is engaged constantly in elevating lower classes of people into participation of all that is good and reasonable and perpetually increasing at the same time their self-activity. Such a civilization we have a right to enforce on this earth.

== Achievements ==
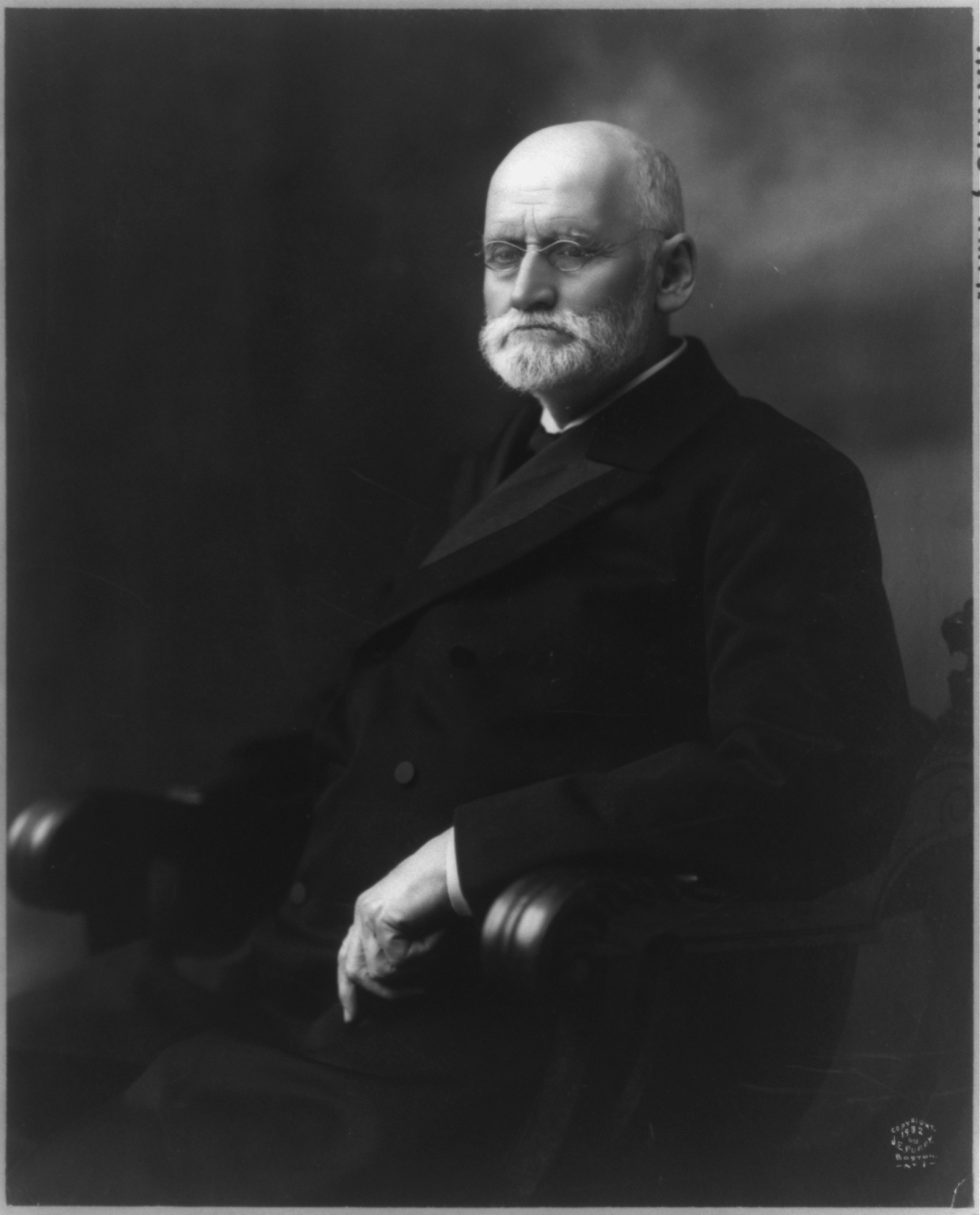

He was also assistant editor of Johnson’s New Universal Cyclopaedia and editor of Appletons' International Education Series. He expanded the United States Bureau of Education and started graphic exhibits of the United States in international expositions.

He was responsible for introducing reindeer into Alaska so that the native whalers and trappers would have another livelihood, before they brought other species to extinction.

Harris was one of the 30 founding members of the Simplified Spelling Board, founded in 1906 by Andrew Carnegie to make English easier to learn and understand through changes in the orthography of the English language.

As editor-in-chief of Webster's New International Dictionary (1909), he originated the divided page.

In the book The Educational Philosophy of William T. Harris by Richard D. Mosier, it is stated that Harris forms the bridge between the mechanism, associationism, and utilitarianism of the 18th century and the pragmatism, experimentalism, and instrumentalism of the 20th century.

William Torrey Harris took Bacon’s original ideas on the organization of information for libraries and modernized them to be applied in the United States by the second half of the 1800s. William Harris, who worked creating a library catalog for the Public Library School of St. Louis, wrote an essay on creating an organization system for libraries. It wasn’t the first one in America (see for example Library of Congress Classification § History) but it was a scheme that gained international reputation rapidly. Harris used a deductive hierarchy and created a structure better adapted to the interrelation of knowledge, which facilitated its application in libraries’ catalogs. Harris proposed a practical system of rules for the classification going from the generic to the specific. Those rules included main divisions, ultimate divisions, appendixes, and hybrids. The problem with Bacon’s approach was the difficulty to limit all knowledge within a restricted classification. Conversely, Harris suggested that content is predominant in minor divisions and sections, while form is the “guiding principle” in the main divisions.

== Works ==
Besides voluminous reports on educational matters, many papers contributed to the Proceedings of the American Social Science Association, and various compilations edited by him, his publications include:

- Introduction to the Study of Philosophy (1889)
- The Spiritual Sense of Dante's Divina Commedia (1889)
- Hegel's Logic: a Critical Exposition (1890)
- A. Bronson Alcott, his Life and Philosophy (with F. B. Sanborn) (1893)
- Psychologic Foundations of Education (1898)
- Elementary Education (Monographs on Education in the United States; vol. 1.) (1900; second edition, 1904)
- The School City (1906)
- The Philosophy of Education (1906)

== Legacy ==
Harris–Stowe State University in St. Louis is named for Harris, and author Harriet Beecher Stowe.

Public School 11 in New York City was named the William T. Harris School but was renamed the Sarah J. Garnet School in 2022.

== See also ==
- American philosophy
- List of American philosophers
- Anna Brackett, associate who later became the first woman principal of a teacher's college

Political offices
Preceded by Nathaniel Dawson	United States Commissioner of Education; 1889–1906	Succeeded by Elmer Brown
