= Liberty Heights, Lexington =

Liberty Heights
- Neighborhood of Lexington, Kentucky
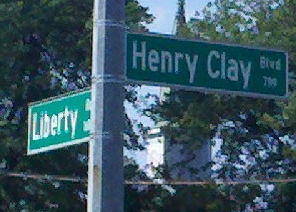
- Liberty and Henry Clay Boulevard

- Location within Kentucky
- Coordinates: 38.037926°N 84.464953°W
- Country: United States
- Commonwealth: Commonwealth of Kentucky
- Urban County: Lexington-Fayette

Area
  - Total: 0.73 sq mi (1.9 km^{2})

Population (2010)
  - Total: 2,585
  - Density: 3,500/sq mi (1,400/km^{2})
- Demonym: Lexingtonian
- Time zone: UTC-5 (EST)
  - Summer (DST): UTC-4 (EDT)
- Postal code: 40505
- Area Code: 859

Liberty Heights is a neighborhood in southeastern Lexington, Kentucky, United States. Its boundaries are Winchester Road to the north, New Circle Road to the east, and R. J. Corman (former CSX) railroad tracks to the west and south.

== Overview ==
The neighborhood has a mixture of postwar and recent single family home subdivisions, as well as apartment homes. The business consists of light industrial, service, wholesale and retail. Lexington's first shopping center, Eastland, is located adjacent to Liberty Heights.

== History ==
Most of Liberty Heights was outside the Lexington city limits until the merger of the city and Fayette County. Despite this, pockets of city coexisted with pockets of "county," sometimes causing confusion of jurisdiction for law enforcement, as there were formerly both Lexington and Fayette County police departments.

When the Union Depot in downtown Lexington was demolished, the Chesapeake & Ohio Railway (C & O, now CSX) continued passenger service on its George Washington streamliner through Lexington until the 1970s, utilizing a newly built Netherlands yard passenger station on Delaware Avenue. The former C & O passenger station building now houses a church.

== Amenities ==
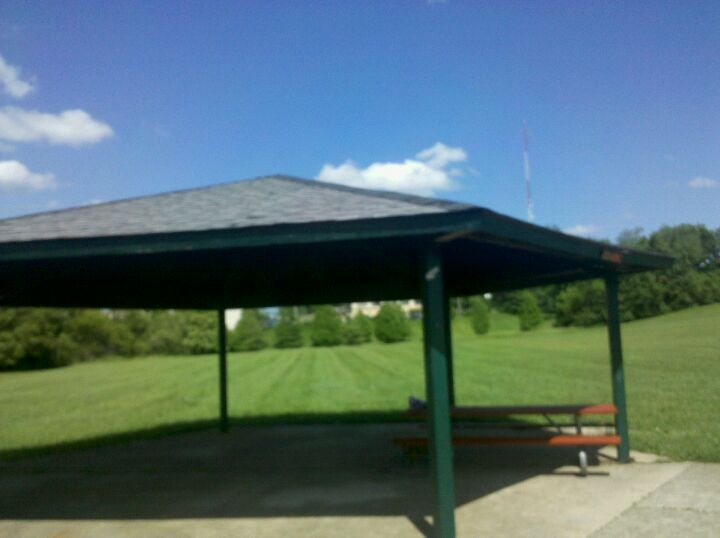
Picnic shelter, Johnson Heights Park

- Public parks
  - Johnson Heights Park has no direct street frontage and access is via bridge walk from 846 Johnsdale Road, back yards, holes in fences or a sidewalk from the North Maintenance building on Liberty Road. The park features acres of grass, hills, playground, picnic shelter, and baseball and basketball facilities.
- Government services
  - Liberty Road station branch of USPS is located in the neighborhood.
  - Family services is located on Creative Drive.
  - A Justice of the Peace is in residence at Henry Clay Boulevard and Delaware Avenue.
  - Transit: two bus lines serve the neighborhood, Eastland (#9) and Hamburg (#10).

== Industry ==
- Unicomp, which licensed the IBM keyboard technology from Lexmark, is located on Henry Clay Boulevard. Its water tower serves as a landmark for the neighborhood.
- Clay-Ingels is housed in the former CSX Netherlands rail yard.
- J.M. Smucker operates the world's largest peanut butter plant, Jif, adjacent to Liberty Heights.

== Notable residents ==
- Louisville-born Mona von Bismarck née Strader was raised on the Strader farm, located at Loudon and Winchester Road. Mona Bismarck was a socialite and fashion icon. She was named to the International Best Dressed List Hall of Fame in 1958.
- Minnesota-born Shirley Ardell Mason lived in obscurity as an artist for the remaining years of her life in the neighborhood, for after her death it was revealed she was the basis for "Sybil Isabel Dorsett" in the book and film Sybil.

== Neighborhood statistics ==
- Population: 2,585
- Land area: 0.73 square miles (1.9 km^{2})
- Population density: 3,541 per sq mile
- Median household income: $29,074
