= Mary Todd Lincoln =

First Lady of the United States from 1861 to 1865

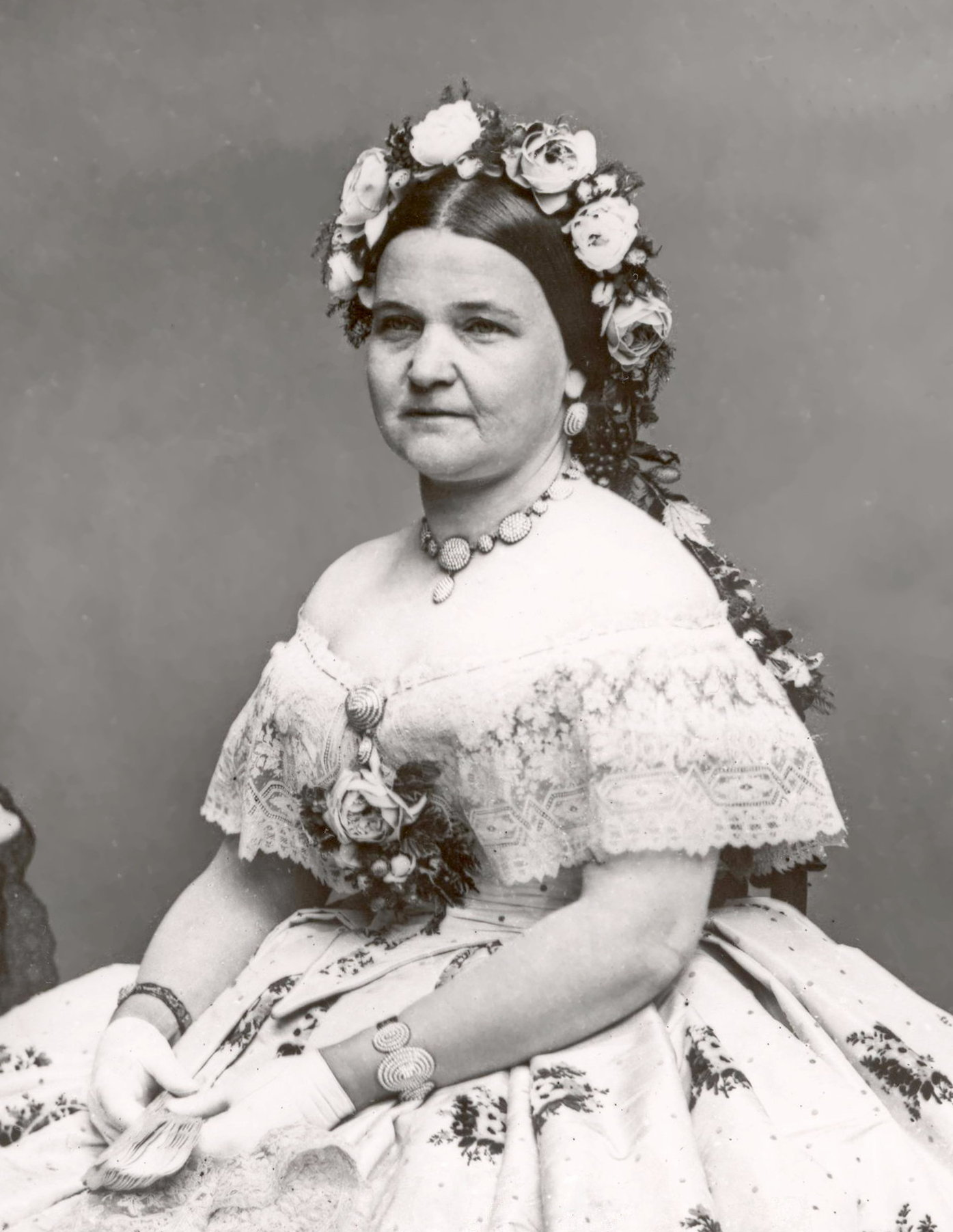
- Lincoln in 1861

First Lady of the United States
- In role March 4, 1861 – April 15, 1865
- President: Abraham Lincoln
- Preceded by: Harriet Lane (acting)
- Succeeded by: Eliza McCardle Johnson

Personal details
- Born: Mary Ann Todd; December 13, 1818 Lexington, Kentucky, U.S.
- Died: July 16, 1882 (aged 63) Springfield, Illinois, U.S.
- Resting place: Lincoln Tomb
- Spouse: Abraham Lincoln (m. 1842; died 1865)
- Children: Robert; Edward; Willie; Tad
- Parent(s): Robert Smith Todd; Elizabeth Ann Parker Todd

Mary Ann Lincoln (née Todd; December 13, 1818 – July 16, 1882) was First Lady of the United States from 1861 until the assassination of her husband, President Abraham Lincoln, in 1865.

Mary Todd was born into a large and wealthy slave-owning family in Kentucky, although Mary never owned slaves and in her adulthood came to oppose slavery. Well educated, after finishing school in her late teens, she moved to Springfield, the capital of Illinois. She lived there with her married sister Elizabeth Todd Edwards, the wife of an Illinois congressman. Before she married Abraham Lincoln, Mary was courted by his long-time political opponent Stephen A. Douglas.

Mary Lincoln staunchly supported her husband's career and political ambitions, and throughout his presidency, she was active in keeping national morale high during the American Civil War. She acted as the White House social coordinator, throwing lavish balls and redecorating the White House at great expense; her spending was the source of much consternation. She was seated next to Abraham when he was assassinated in the President's Box at Ford's Theatre in Washington, D.C., on April 14, 1865.

The Lincolns had four sons, of whom only the eldest, Robert, survived both parents. The deaths of her husband and three of their sons weighed heavily on her. Young Thomas (Tad), who died suddenly in 1871, had just spent an extended time traveling with her after Robert married. Mary Lincoln suffered from physical and mental health issues. She had frequent headaches, which were exacerbated by a head injury in 1863.

She likely suffered from depression or possibly bipolar disorder. She was briefly institutionalized for psychiatric illness in 1875, and then spent several years traveling in Europe. She later retired to her sister's home in Springfield, where she died in 1882 at age 63. She is buried with her husband and three younger sons in the Lincoln Tomb, a National Historic Landmark.

== Early life and education ==
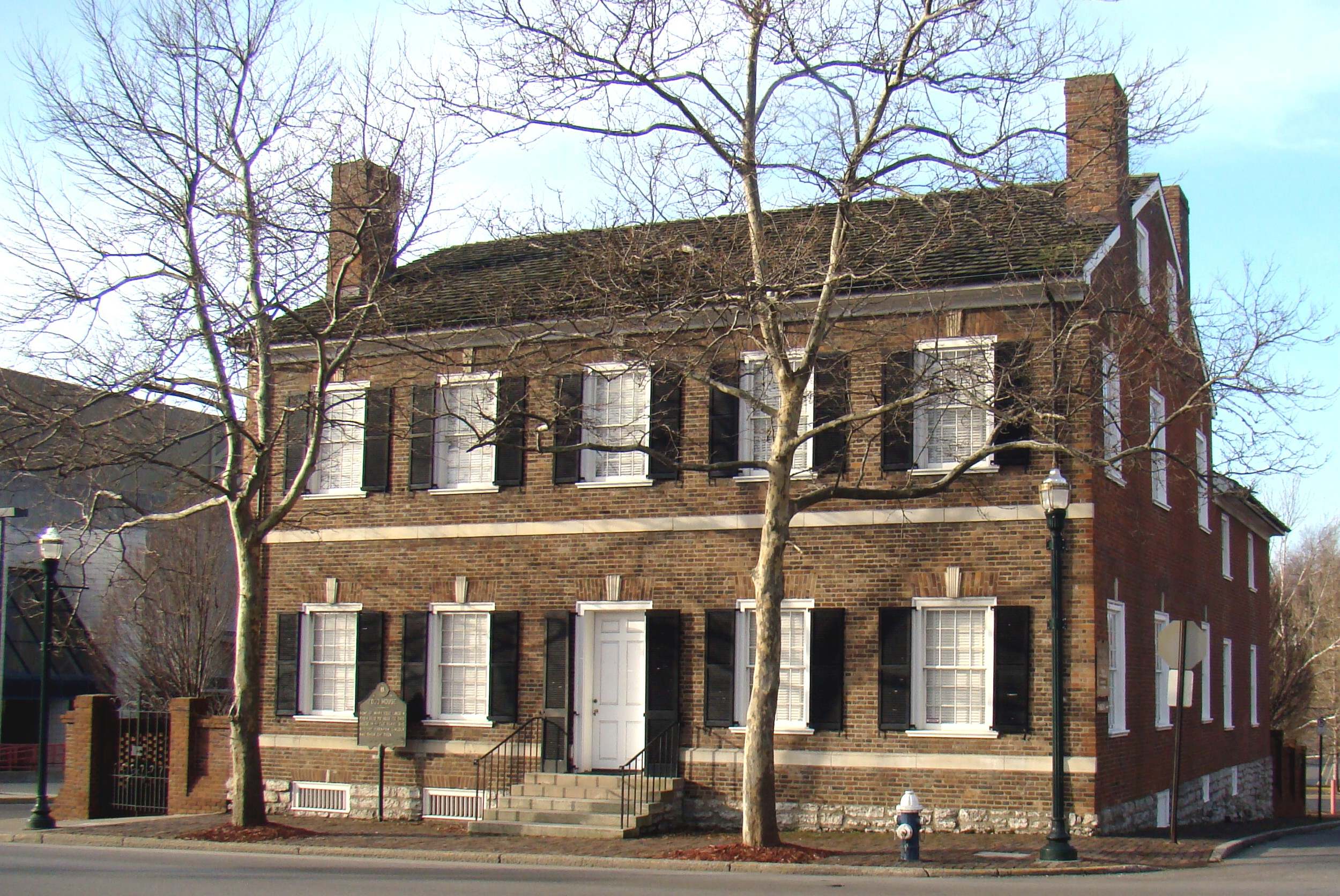
The Todd family home, now preserved as the Mary Todd Lincoln House at 578 West Main Street in Lexington, Kentucky

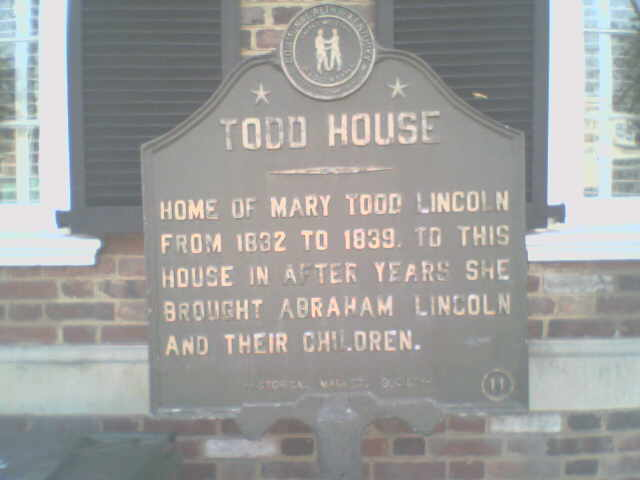
State historical marker at the Todd house, noting Mary's residence years (1832–1839)

Todd was born on December 13, 1818, in Lexington, Kentucky, as the fourth of seven children of Robert Smith Todd, a banker, and Elizabeth "Eliza" (Parker) Todd. In 1825, when she was six, her mother died in childbirth. Her father then married Elizabeth "Betsy" Humphreys in 1826 and they had nine children together.

There is conflicting evidence about Todd's relationship with her stepmother. From 1832, Mary and her family lived in what is now known as the Mary Todd Lincoln House, an elegant 14-room residence at 578 West Main Street in Lexington.

Mary's paternal great-grandfather, David Levi Todd, was born in County Longford, Ireland, and immigrated through Pennsylvania to Kentucky. Another great-grandfather, Andrew Porter, was the son of an Irish immigrant to New Hampshire and later Pennsylvania. Her maternal great-great-grandfather Samuel McDowell was born in Scotland, and emigrated to Pennsylvania. Other Todd ancestors came from England.

At an early age, Mary was sent to Madame Mentelle's finishing school, where the curriculum concentrated on French and literature. She learned to speak French fluently and studied dance, drama, music, and social graces. By age 20, she was regarded as witty and gregarious with a grasp of politics. Like her family, she was a Whig.

Mary began living with her sister Elizabeth Porter Edwards in Springfield, Illinois, in October 1839. Elizabeth was married to Ninian W. Edwards, son of a former governor. He served as Mary's guardian. Mary was popular among the gentry of Springfield, and though she was courted by the rising young lawyer and Democratic Party politician Stephen A. Douglas and others, she chose Abraham Lincoln, a fellow Whig.

== Marriage and family ==
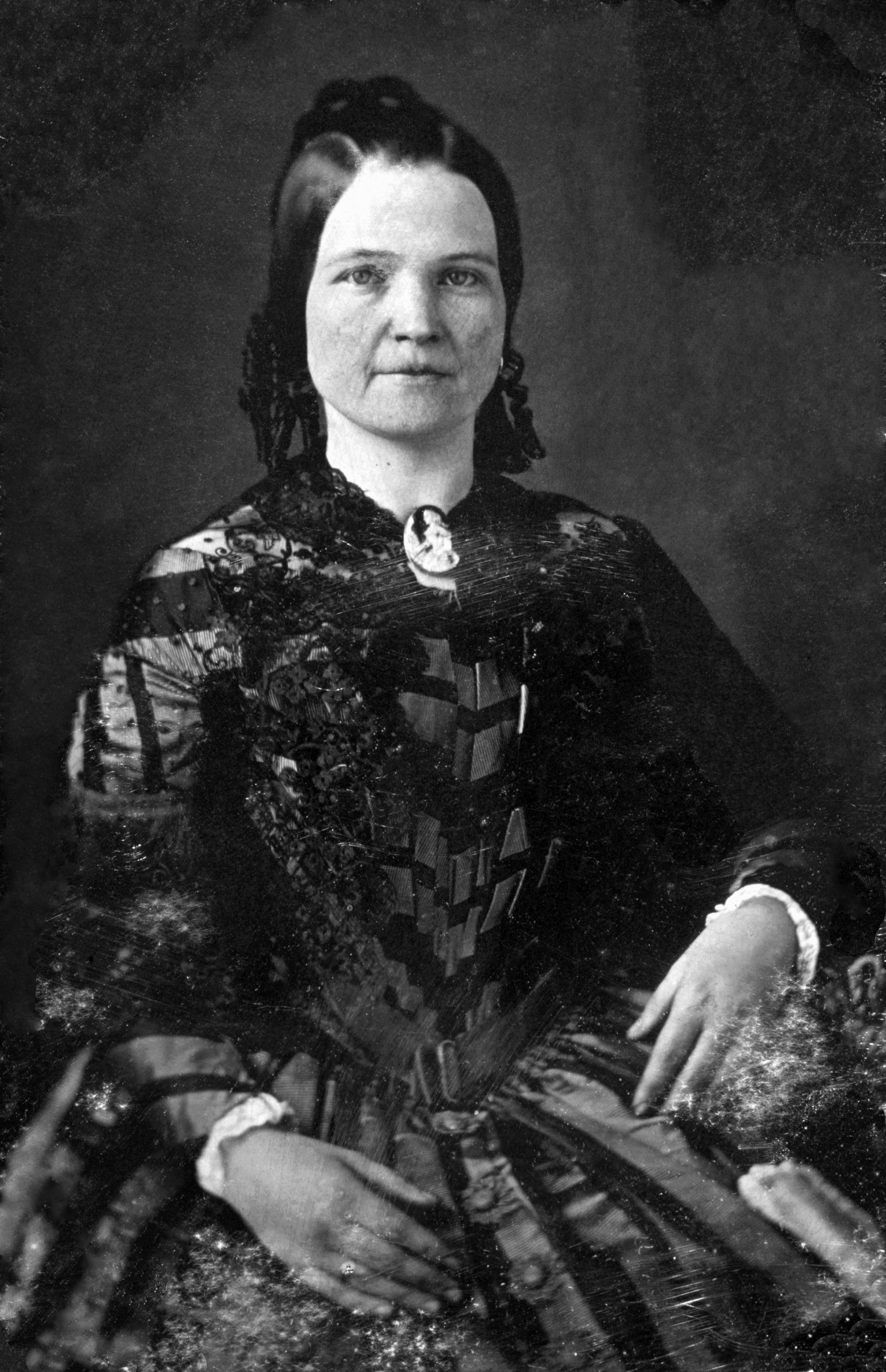
Mary Todd Lincoln, c. 1846–1847

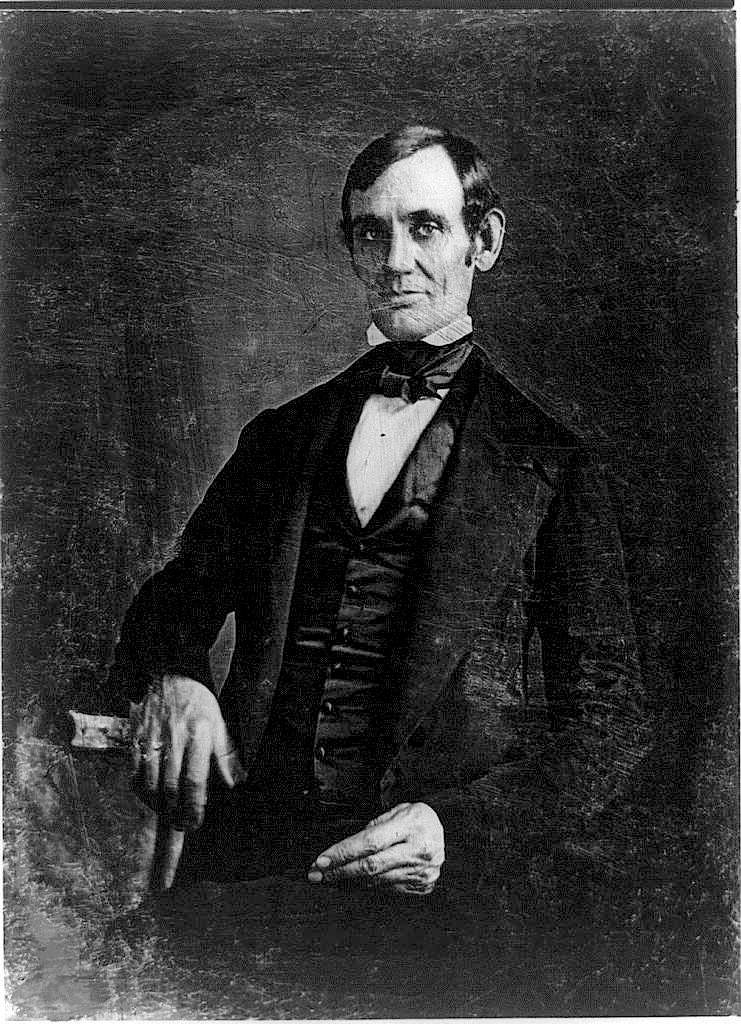
Abraham Lincoln in 1846

Todd met Lincoln, then a struggling lawyer, at the house of her older sister Elizabeth Edwards. The two formed a connection due to their mutual interest in politics and were soon engaged. However, Elizabeth and her husband, Ninian Edwards, disapproved of the relationship due to Lincoln's lower-class status, along with his indefinite future. Their engagement was broken off on New Year's Day of 1841, which the future president referred to as "that fatal first of January".

Lincoln fell in love with Matilda Edwards in the autumn of 1840, and this caused him to break his engagement to Mary. In the following weeks after their breakup, Lincoln went into a depression, and was described by his then business partner as "reduced and emaciated in his appearance".

After a year and a half, the couple secretly rekindled their relationship and married on November 4, 1842. Todd was 23 and Lincoln was 33. Lincoln allegedly met Ninian on the street the day of their wedding and confessed his plan to marry the latter's sister-in-law, to which Ninian, feeling responsible for Todd, demanded they wed at his own house. Likewise, the bride did not tell her sister about her marriage until the day of, to which Elizabeth acquiesced.

After their wedding, the couple moved into a one-room apartment in a tavern, where Todd gave birth to their first son, Robert Todd Lincoln. Around a year later, they moved to a more spacious, one-and-a-half-story cottage.

Their four sons, all born in Springfield, Illinois, were:

- Robert Todd Lincoln (1843–1926), lawyer, diplomat (U.S. Secretary of War), businessman
- Edward Baker Lincoln, known as "Eddie" (1846–1850), died of tuberculosis
- William Wallace Lincoln, known as "Willie" (1850–1862), died of typhoid fever while Lincoln was President
- Thomas Lincoln, known as "Tad" (1853–1871), died at age 18 (either from pleurisy, pneumonia, congestive heart failure, or tuberculosis)

Robert and Tad (Thomas) survived to adulthood and the death of their father, and only Robert outlived his mother.

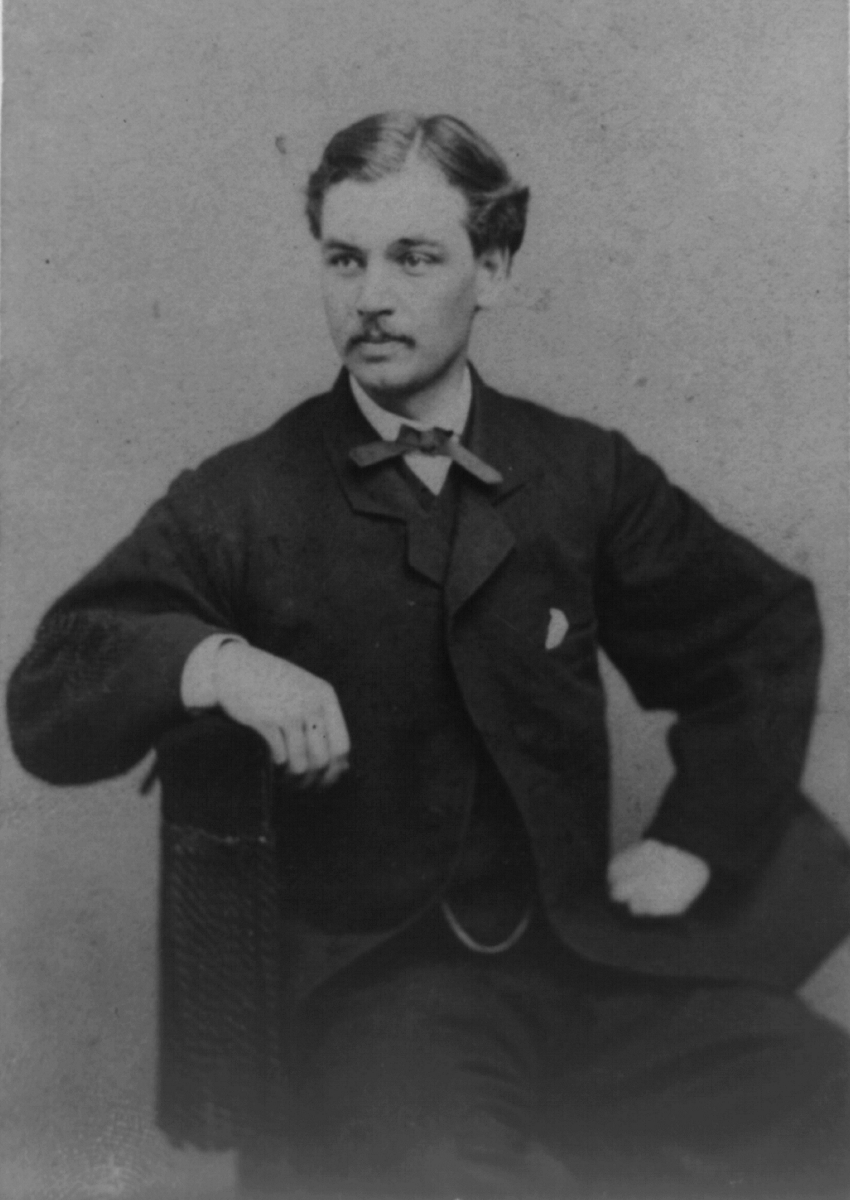
Robert Todd Lincoln, born 1843

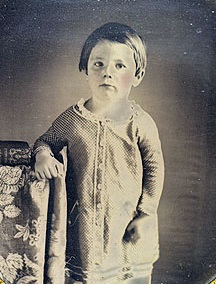
Edward Baker Lincoln, born 1846

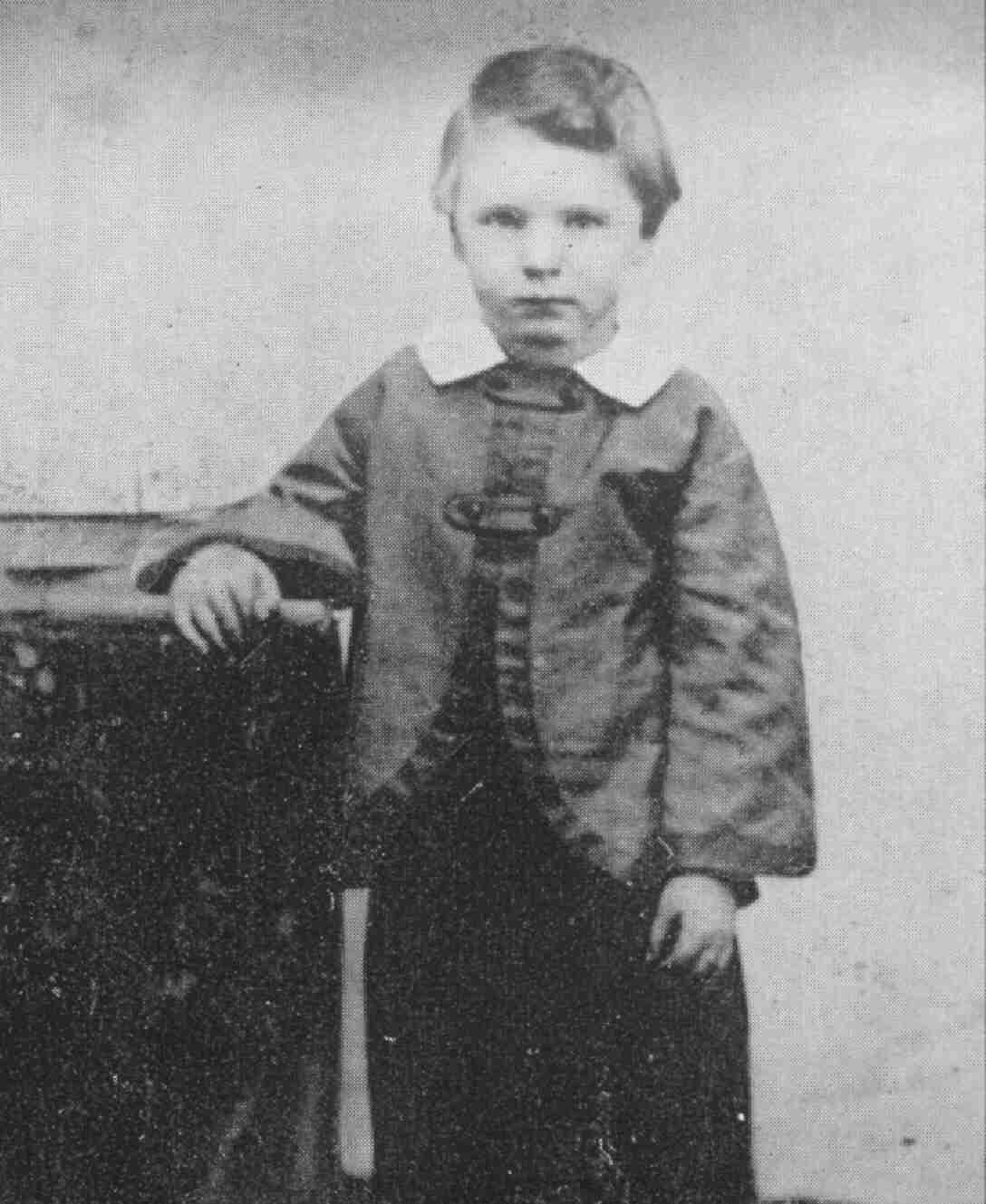
William Wallace Lincoln, born 1850

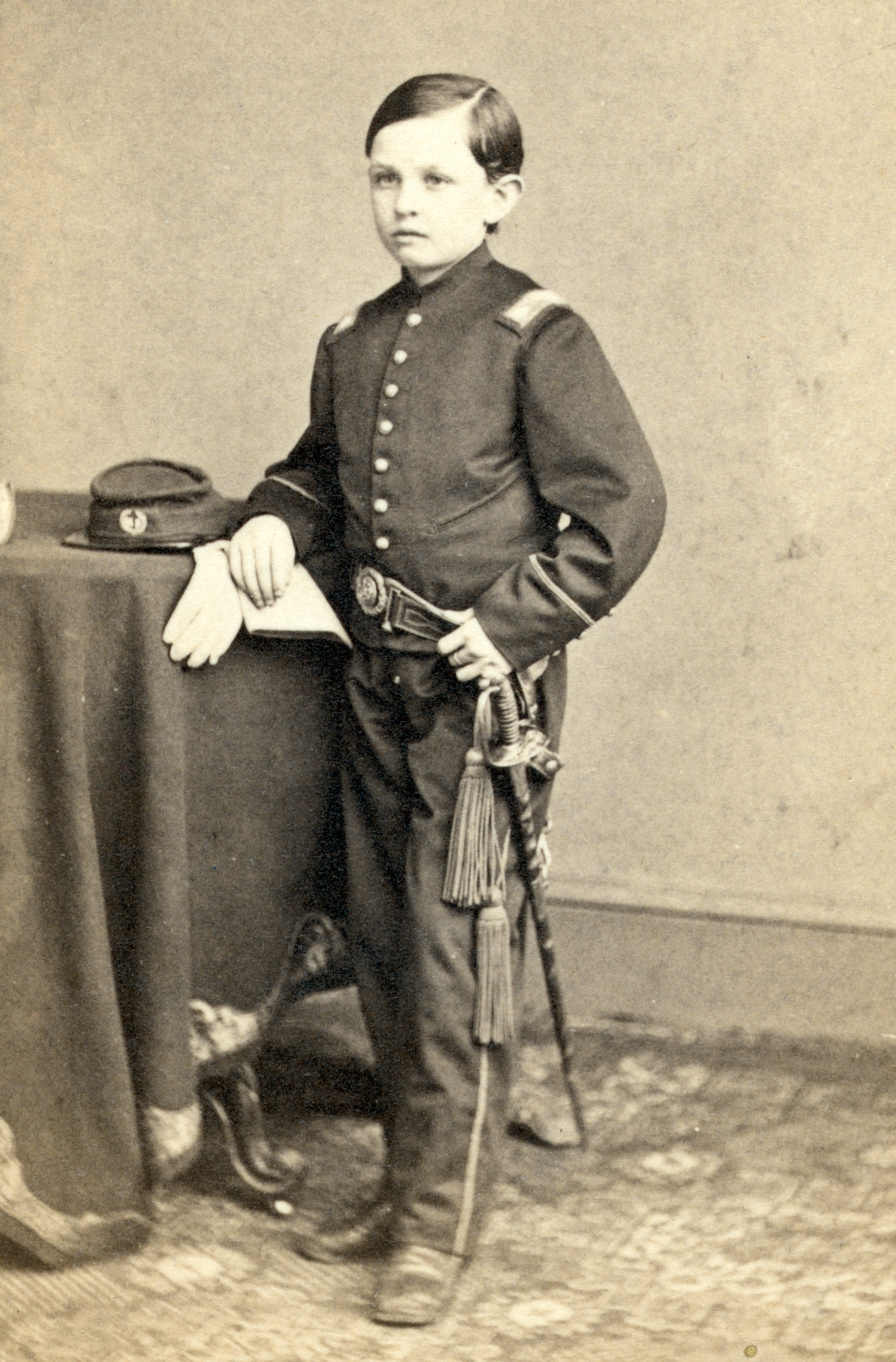
Thomas Lincoln, born 1853

== Lincoln's career and home life ==
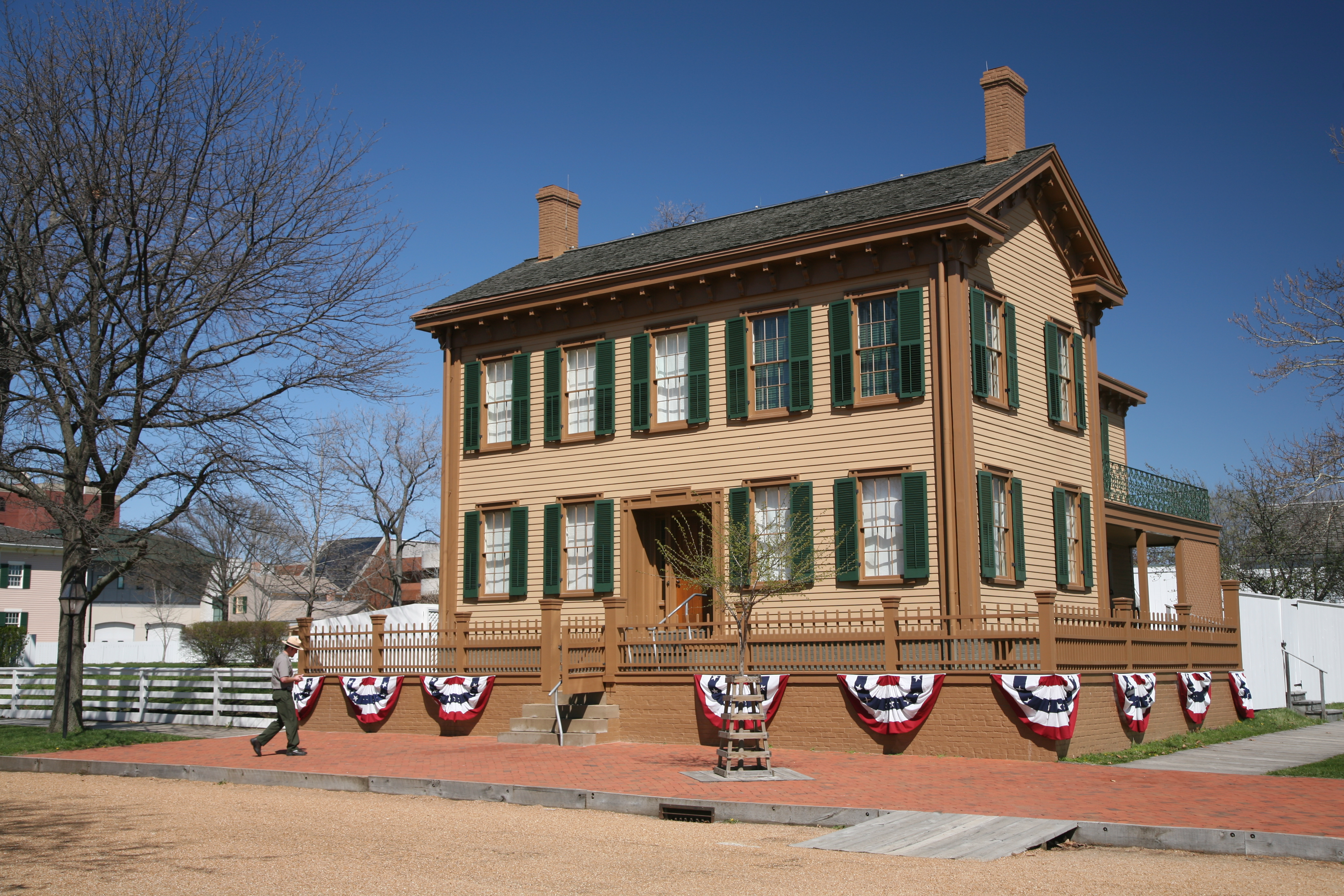
The Lincoln Home at Eighth and Jackson Streets in Springfield, Illinois, where Abraham and Mary Todd Lincoln resided from 1844 until they left for the White House in 1861

While Lincoln pursued his increasingly successful career as a Springfield lawyer, Mary supervised their growing household. Their house, where they resided from 1844 until 1861, still stands in Springfield and has been designated the Lincoln Home National Historic Site.

During Lincoln's years as an Illinois circuit lawyer, Mary was often left alone for months at a time to raise their children and run the household. Mary supported her husband socially and politically, not least when Lincoln was elected president in 1860.

Mary cooked for Lincoln often during his presidency. Raised by a wealthy family, her cooking was simple, but satisfied Lincoln's tastes, which included imported oysters.

== First Lady of the United States ==
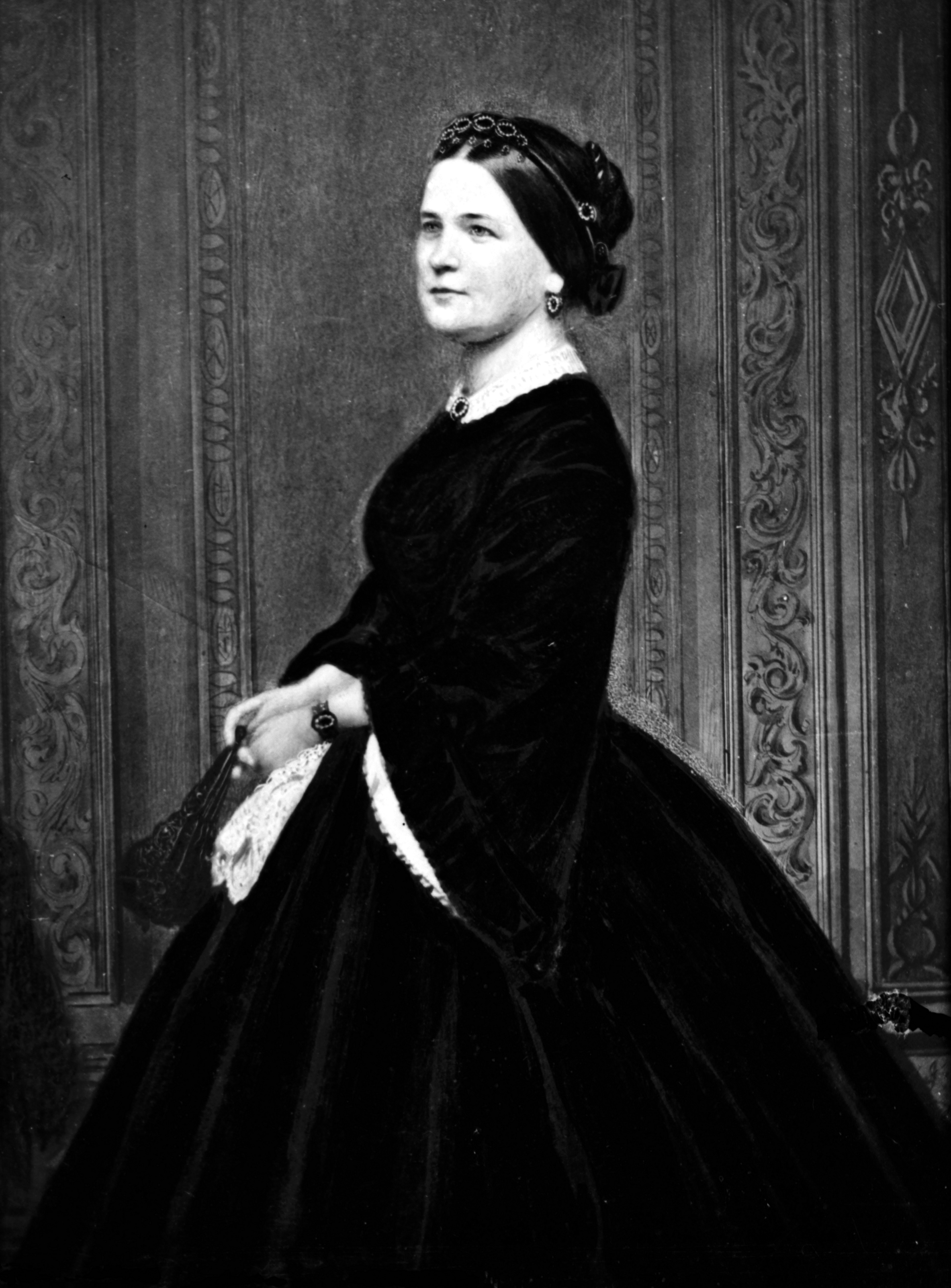
Mary Lincoln, c. 1860–65

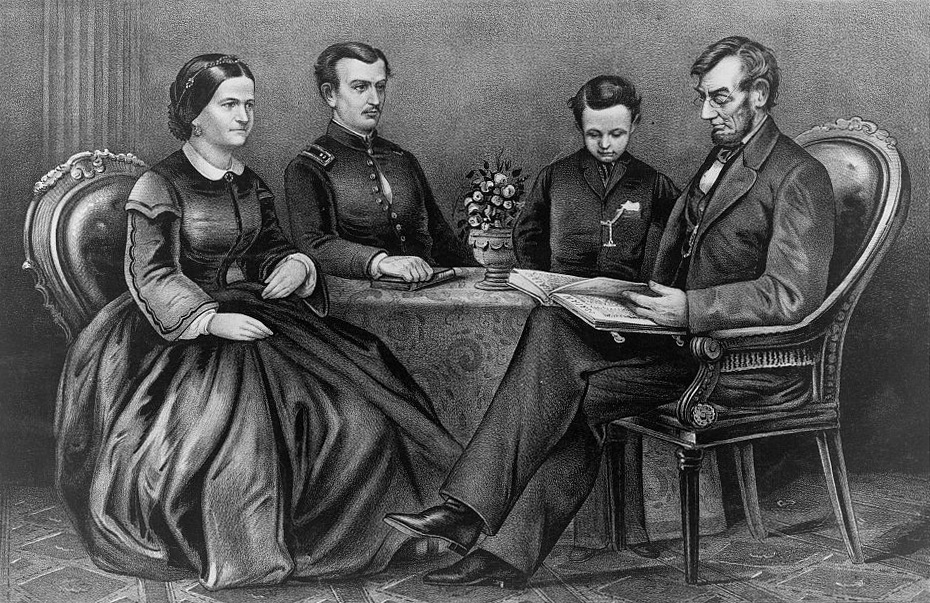
An 1867 lithograph by Currier and Ives shows Abraham Lincoln with Mary Lincoln and their sons, Robert and Thomas ("Tad")

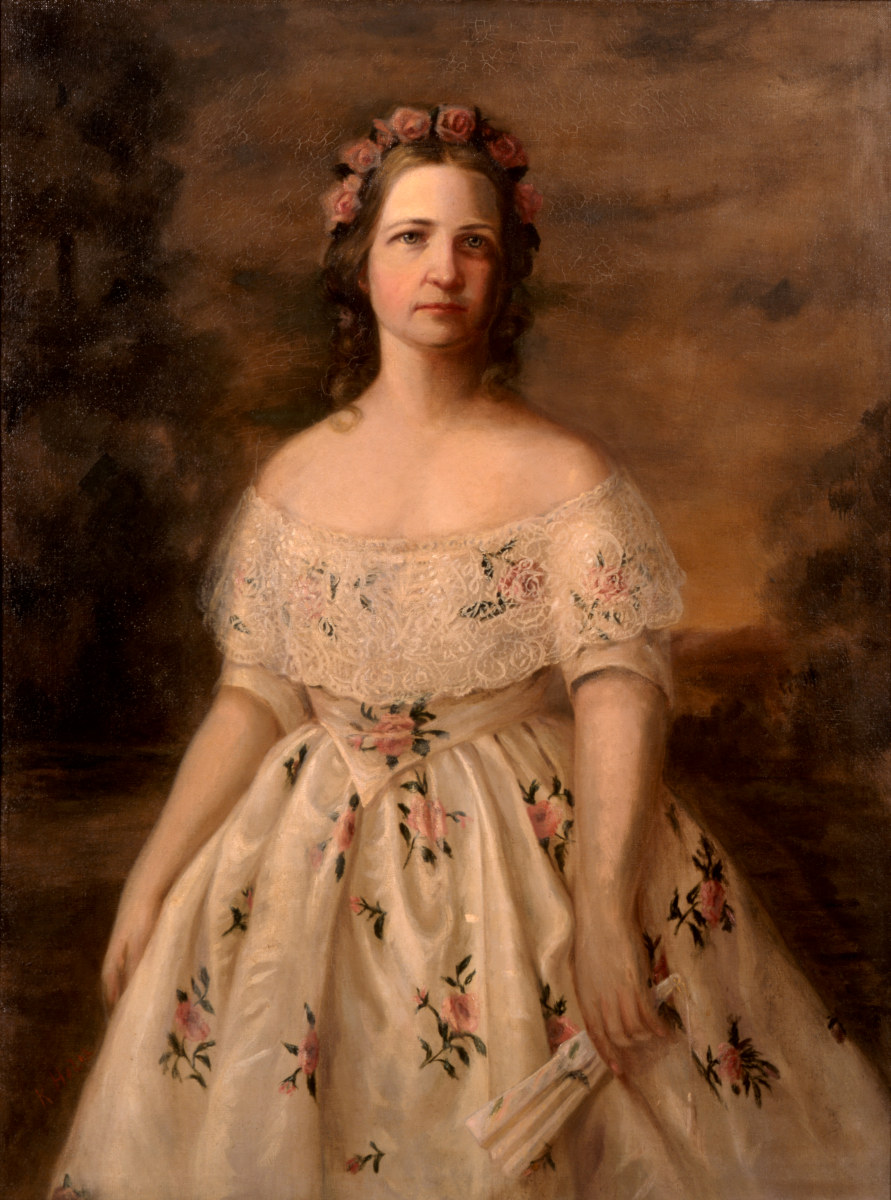
Official White House portrait by Katherine Helm

During her White House years, Mary Lincoln faced many personal difficulties generated by political divisions within the nation. Her family was from a border state where slavery was permitted. Several of her half-brothers served in the Confederate Army and were killed in action, and one brother served the Confederacy as a surgeon.

Mary staunchly supported her husband in his quest to save the Union and was strictly loyal to his policies. Considered a "westerner" although she had grown up in the more refined Upper South city of Lexington, Mary worked hard to serve as her husband's First Lady in Washington, D.C., a political center dominated by eastern culture. Lincoln was regarded as the first "western" president, and critics described Mary's manners as coarse and pretentious.

She had difficulty negotiating White House social responsibilities and rivalries, spoils-seeking solicitors, and baiting newspapers in a climate of high national intrigue in Civil War Washington. She refurbished the White House, which included extensive redecorating of all the public and private rooms as well as the purchase of new china, which led to extensive overspending.

The president was very angry over the cost, even though Congress eventually passed two additional appropriations to cover these expenses. Mary also was a frequent purchaser of fine jewelry and on many occasions bought jewelry on credit from the local Galt & Bro. jewelers. Upon President Lincoln's death, she had a large amount of debt with the jeweler, which was subsequently waived, and much of the jewelry was returned.

Mary suffered from severe headaches, described as migraines, throughout her adult life, as well as protracted depression. Her headaches seemed to become more frequent after she suffered a head injury in a carriage accident during her White House years.

A history of mood swings, fierce temper, public outbursts throughout Lincoln's presidency, as well as excessive spending, has led some historians and psychologists to argue that Mary suffered from bipolar disorder.

Another theory holds that Mary's manic and depressive episodes, as well as many of her physical symptoms, could be explained as manifestations of pernicious anemia.

Mary Lincoln's grief over Willie's death was so devastating that she took to her bed for three weeks, so desolated that she could not attend his funeral or look after Tad. Mary was so distraught for many months that Lincoln had to employ a nurse to look after her.

During her White House years, she often visited hospitals around Washington to give flowers and fruit to wounded soldiers. She took the time to write letters for them to send to their loved ones. From time to time, she accompanied Lincoln on military visits to the field. Responsible for hosting many social functions, she has often been blamed by historians for spending too much money on the White House.

== Assassination of Abraham Lincoln ==
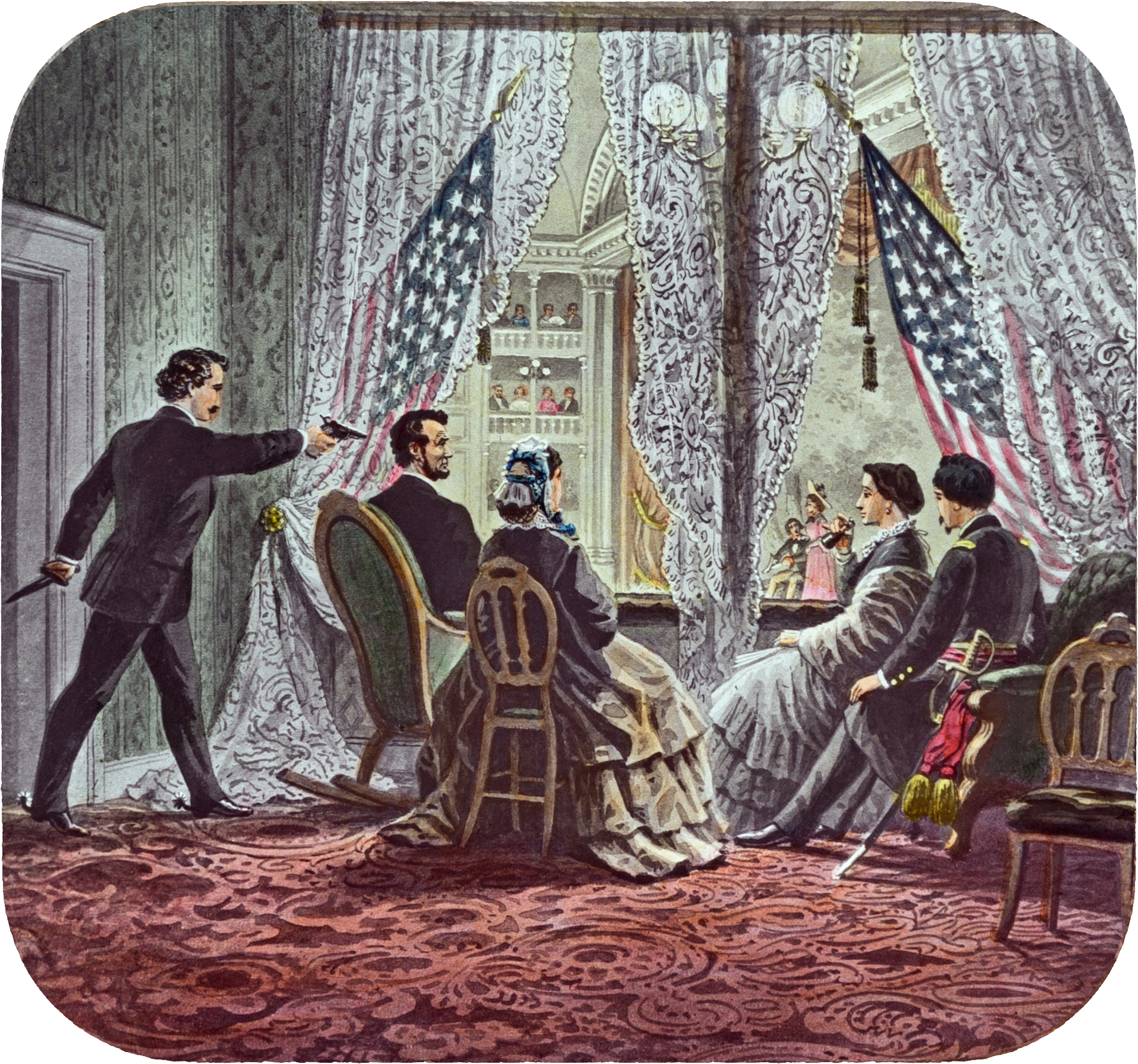
An illustration of the assassination of Abraham Lincoln on April 14, 1865, in the presidential booth at Ford's Theatre. Left to right: assassin John Wilkes Booth, Abraham Lincoln, Mary Todd Lincoln, Clara Harris, and Henry Rathbone

As the American Civil War ended, Mrs. Lincoln expected to continue as the First Lady of a nation at peace. President Lincoln awoke the morning of April 14, 1865, in a pleasant mood. Robert E. Lee had surrendered several days before to Ulysses Grant, and now the President was awaiting word from North Carolina on the surrender of Joseph E. Johnston. The morning papers carried the announcement that the President and his wife would be attending the theater that evening.

At one point, Mary developed a headache and was inclined to stay home, but Lincoln told her they must attend because newspapers had announced that he would.

Mrs. Lincoln sat with her husband watching the comic play Our American Cousin at Ford's Theatre, along with their guests Henry Rathbone and Clara Harris. During the third act, Mr. Lincoln and Mrs. Lincoln drew closer together, holding hands while enjoying the play. In the last conversation the Lincolns would ever have, Mary whispered to her husband, who was holding her hand, "What will Miss Harris think of my hanging on to you so?" The president smiled and replied, "She won't think anything about it".

At about 10:15 pm, President Lincoln was shot in the back of the head by John Wilkes Booth. Mary was holding Abraham's hand when the shooting occurred. Lincoln, who had immediately lost consciousness, was held up in his rocking chair by a hysterical Mary. As Lincoln was carried out of the box by doctors, Mary composed herself briefly and gave Major Edwin Eliaphron Bedee the president's private papers from his pockets.

Mrs. Lincoln accompanied her husband across the street to the Petersen House, where he was taken to a back bedroom and laid crosswise on the bed there, where Lincoln's Cabinet was summoned, except William Seward, who had been seriously attacked by Lewis Powell, just as Booth was about to carry out his assassination at Ford's Theater, several minutes earlier. Their oldest son, Robert, sat with Lincoln throughout the night and to the following morning, Saturday, April 15, 1865. Harris stated, "Poor Mrs. Lincoln, all through that dreadful night would look at me with horror & scream, 'Oh! my husband's blood, my dear husband's blood' ... It was Henry's blood, not the president's, but explanations were pointless." At one point, Edwin M. Stanton, Lincoln's Secretary of War, ordered Mary from the room as she was so unhinged with grief.

President Lincoln remained in a coma for approximately nine hours before he died at 7:22 a.m. at the age of 56. Shortly before 7 a.m. Mary was allowed to return to Lincoln's side, and, as Dixon reported, "she again seated herself by the President, kissing him and calling him every endearing name." As he died, his breathing grew quieter, his face more calm. According to some accounts, at his last drawn breath, on the morning after the assassination, he smiled broadly and then expired. (Note: Attributed to multiple sources:)

Historians, most notably author Lee Davis, have emphasized Lincoln's peaceful appearance when and after he died: "It was the first time in four years, probably, that a peaceful expression crossed his face." Assistant Secretary of the Treasury in the Lincoln Administration, Maunsell Bradhurst Field wrote, "I had never seen upon the President's face an expression more genial and pleasing." The President's secretary, John Hay, said, "A look of unspeakable peace came upon his worn features".

== Later life ==
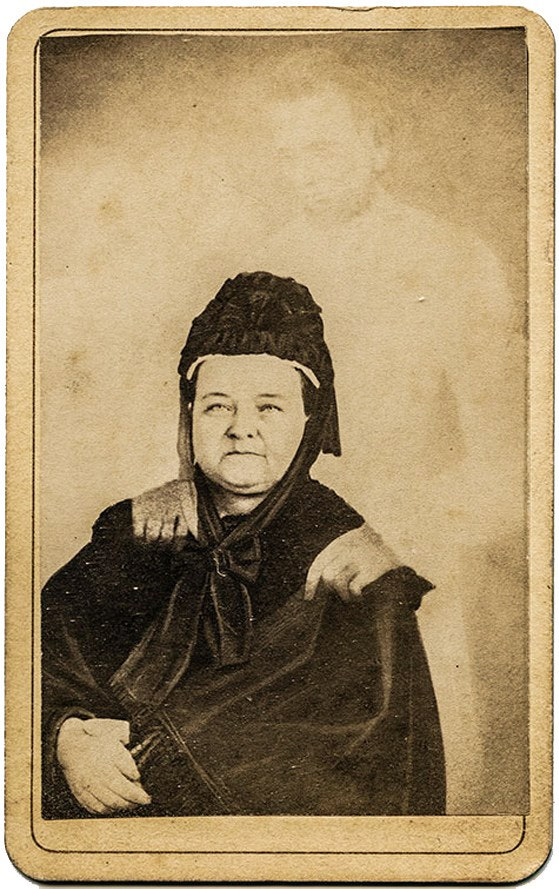
Mary Todd Lincoln with the "ghost" of her husband, in an image taken by spirit photographer William H. Mumler, though Mumler's photos are now known to be hoaxes

After her husband's death, she received messages of condolence from all over the world, many of which she attempted to answer personally. Responding to Queen Victoria she wrote:

I have received the letter which Your Majesty has had the kindness to write. I am deeply grateful for its expressions of tender sympathy, coming as they do, from a heart which from its own sorrow, can appreciate the intense grief I now endure.

Victoria had suffered the loss of her husband, Prince Albert, four years earlier.

As a widow, Mrs. Lincoln returned to Illinois and lived in Chicago with her sons. Her husband had left an estate of $80,000 (equivalent to $1,682,609 in 2025), which should have been enough to keep her in comfort, if not in style.

In 1868, Mrs Lincoln, who had a lavish, unstable relationship with money, advertised in the New York World for aid and attempted to sell her personal effects at auction, which shocked the public. She and her young son Tad moved to Europe and settled in Frankfurt for several years. During this time, the Seligman family helped look after her, paying the cost of the voyage, sending her money, and advocating on her behalf.

In 1868, her former modiste (dressmaker) and confidante, Elizabeth Keckley (1818–1907), published Behind the Scenes, or, Thirty Years a Slave, and Four Years in the White House. She had been born into slavery, purchased her freedom and that of her son, and become a successful businesswoman in Washington, D.C. Although this book provides valuable insight into the character and life of Mary Todd Lincoln, at the time, the former First Lady (and much of the public and press) regarded it as a breach of friendship and confidentiality. Keckley was widely criticized for her book, especially as her editor had published letters from Mary Lincoln to her.

The work is now generally accepted by many historians and biographers, used to flesh out the President and First Lady's personalities behind the scenes in the Executive Mansion, and used as the basis for several motion pictures and TV mini-series during the late 20th and early 21st centuries.

In an act approved by a low margin on July 14, 1870, the United States Congress granted Mrs. Lincoln a life pension of $3,000 a year ($76,382 in 2025 dollars). Mary had lobbied hard for such a pension, writing numerous letters to Congress and urging patrons such as Simon Cameron and Joseph Seligman to petition on her behalf. She insisted that she deserved a pension just as much as the widows of soldiers, as she portrayed her husband as a fallen commander. At the time, a pension was unusual for widows of presidents, and Mary Lincoln had alienated many congressmen, making it difficult for her to gain Congress's approval.

Soon after returning to the United States, Tad died at the age of 18 at the Clifton House hotel in Chicago. (Note: The cause of death has been variously referred to as tuberculosis, a pleuristic attack, pneumonia, or congestive heart failure.) (Note: Emerson, Jason (2012). Giant in the Shadows:The Life of Robert T. Lincoln. SIU (Southern Illinois University) Press. p. 478. ISBN 978-0-8093-9071-7. "With serious effusion compressing the lungs and crowding the nearby heart, there was not enough oxygen to maintain the life centers of the brain" (quoting Milton Shutes, "Mortality of the Five Lincoln Boys", Lincoln Herald, vol. 57 (Spring 1955), p. 7.)) Tad's death in July 1871, following the deaths of two of her other sons and her husband, brought on an overpowering grief and depression. Her surviving son, Robert Lincoln, a rising young Chicago lawyer, was alarmed at his mother's increasingly erratic behavior. In March 1875, during a visit to Jacksonville, Florida, Mary became unshakably convinced that Robert was deathly ill; hurrying to Chicago, she found him healthy. During her visit with him, she told him that someone had tried to poison her on the train and that a "wandering Jew" had taken her pocketbook but returned it.

She also spent large amounts of money there on items she never used, such as draperies and elaborate dresses (she wore only black after her husband's assassination). She walked around the city with $56,000 in government bonds sewn into her petticoats. Despite this large amount of money and the $3,000-a-year stipend from Congress, Mrs. Lincoln still feared poverty.

In 1872, she went to spiritualist photographer William H. Mumler, who produced a photograph of her that appears to faintly show Lincoln's ghost behind her, now housed at the Allen County Public Library in Fort Wayne, Indiana. The College of Psychic Studies, referencing notes belonging to William Stainton Moses, claims that the photo was taken in the early 1870s, that Lincoln had assumed the name of 'Mrs. Lindall', and that Lincoln had to be encouraged by Mumler's wife to identify her husband in the photo. P.T. Barnum, testifying against Mumler in his eventual fraud trial, presented a photo featuring himself with the 'ghost' of Abraham Lincoln, demonstrating for the court how easy it was to make one of Mumler's images.

The image is recognized now as a hoax created via double exposure by inserting a previously prepared positive glass plate featuring the image of the deceased into the camera in front of an unused sensitive glass plate.

=== Institutionalization ===
Due to her erratic behavior, Robert initiated proceedings to have her institutionalized. On May 20, 1875, following a trial, a jury committed her to a private asylum in Batavia, Illinois. After the court proceedings, she was so despondent that she attempted suicide. She went to several pharmacies and ordered enough laudanum to kill herself, but an alert pharmacist frustrated her attempts and finally gave her a placebo.

Three months after being committed to Bellevue Place, she devised her escape: She smuggled letters to her lawyer, James B. Bradwell, and his wife, Myra Bradwell, who was not only her friend but also a feminist lawyer. She also wrote to the editor of the Chicago Times.

Soon, the public embarrassments that Robert had hoped to avoid were looming, and his character and motives were in question as he controlled his mother's finances. The director of Bellevue at Mary's trial had assured the jury she would benefit from treatment at his facility. In the face of potentially damaging publicity, he declared her well enough to go to Springfield to live with her sister Elizabeth as she desired.

Mary Lincoln was released into the custody of her sister in Springfield. In 1876, she was declared competent to manage her own affairs. The earlier committal proceedings had resulted in Mary being profoundly estranged from her son Robert, and they did not see each other again until shortly before her death.

Mrs. Lincoln spent the next four years traveling throughout Europe and took up residence in Pau, France. Her final years were marked by declining health. She suffered from severe cataracts that reduced her eyesight; this condition may have contributed to her increasing susceptibility to falls. In 1879, she suffered spinal cord injuries in a fall from a stepladder.

She traveled to New York in 1881 and lobbied for an increased pension after the assassination of President Garfield raised the issue of provisions for his family. She faced a difficult battle due to negative press over her spending habits and rumors about her handling of her personal finances, including $56,000 in government bonds left to her by her husband. Congress eventually granted the increase, along with an additional monetary gift.

During the early 1880s, Mary Lincoln was confined to the Springfield, Illinois, residence of her sister Elizabeth Edwards.

=== Death ===
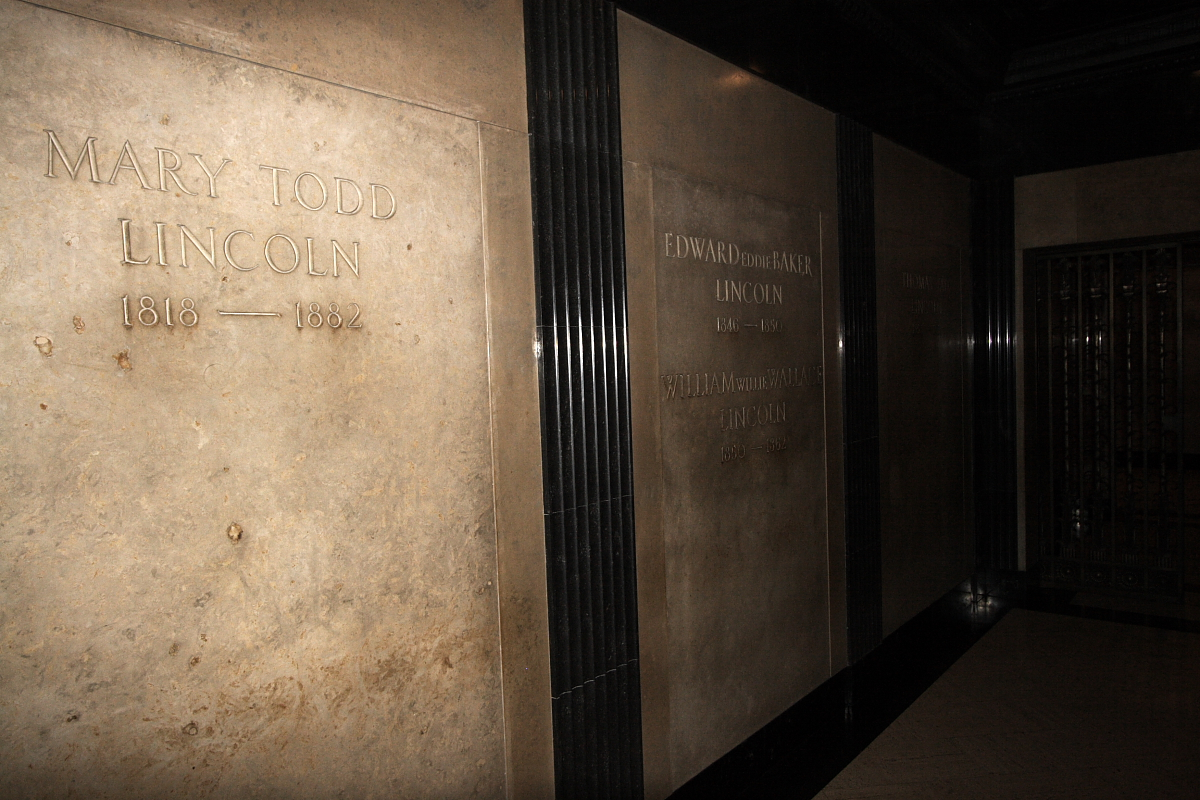
Mary Todd Lincoln's crypt at Oak Ridge Cemetery in Springfield, Illinois, next to her sons

On July 15, 1882, exactly eleven years after her youngest son died, Mary collapsed at her sister's home, lapsed into a coma, and died the next morning of a stroke at age 63. Her funeral service was held at First Presbyterian Church in Springfield.

== In popular culture ==
External videos
- Presentation by Jean H. Baker on Mary Todd Lincoln: A Biography, November 17, 1998, C-SPAN

Biographies have been written about Mary Lincoln as well as her husband. Barbara Hambly's The Emancipator's Wife (2005) is considered a well-researched historical novel that provides context for her use of over-the-counter drugs containing alcohol and opium, which were frequently given to women of her era. Janis Cooke Newman's historical novel Mary: Mrs. A. Lincoln (2007), in which Mary tells her own story after incarceration in the asylum in an effort to maintain and prove her sanity, is considered by Mary's recent biographer, Jean H. Baker, to be 'close to life' in its depiction of Mary Lincoln's life.

The grief experienced through her widowhood is a theme of Andrew Holleran's 2006 novel, Grief. Another historical novel in which Mary Todd Lincoln is depicted is Courting Mr. Lincoln (2019) by Louis Bayard, centering on Lincoln's relationships with Mary Todd and Joshua Fry Speed, Abraham Lincoln's good friend, in Springfield from 1839 to 1842.

Mary Lincoln has been portrayed by several actresses in film, including Kay Hammond in Abraham Lincoln (1930) directed by D.W. Griffith; Marjorie Weaver in Young Mr. Lincoln (1939) directed by John Ford; Ruth Gordon in Abe Lincoln in Illinois (1940); Julie Harris in The Last of Mrs. Lincoln, a 1976 television adaptation of the stage play; Mary Tyler Moore in the 1988 television mini-series Lincoln; Donna Murphy in the 1998 movie The Day Lincoln Was Shot; Sally Field in Steven Spielberg's 2012 film Lincoln; Penelope Ann Miller in Saving Lincoln (2012); and Mary Elizabeth Winstead in Abraham Lincoln: Vampire Hunter (2012), set during the American Civil War. Mezzo-soprano Elaine Bonazzi portrayed Mary in Thomas Pasatieri's Emmy Award winning opera The Trial of Mary Lincoln in 1972.

In 1955, Vivi Janiss played the historical Mary Todd Lincoln in "How Chance Made Lincoln President" in the anthology television series, TV Reader's Digest. Richard Gaines was cast as Abraham Lincoln, and Ken Hardison played their son, Robert Todd Lincoln.

In 2005, Sufjan Stevens referenced Mary Todd Lincoln in the instrumental track "A Short Reprise for Mary Todd, Who Went Insane, but for Very Good Reasons" from his album Illinois, which is themed around the state where she resided the majority of her life.

The comedic stage play Oh, Mary! opened on Broadway in July 2024, having transferred from its critically acclaimed off-Broadway run. The satirical plot by American comedian Cole Escola parodies the Lincolns in the weeks prior to the president's assassination, portraying Mary Todd as an unhappy alcoholic desperate to be a cabaret performer. Escola won Best Actor in a Play at the 78th Tony Awards for spoofing Mary Todd.

The play Mrs. President by John Ransom Phillips centers on Mary Todd's interaction with the photographer Matthew Brady.

Mary Todd Lincoln was portrayed by Lili Taylor in the 2024 Apple TV+ miniseries series Manhunt.

== Family ==
Her sister Elizabeth Todd married Ninian Edwards Jr., the son of the Illinois Governor Ninian Edwards. Their daughter Julia Edwards married Edward L. Baker Jr., editor of the Illinois State Journal and son of Edward L. Baker Sr. Their daughter, Mary Todd Lincoln's grandniece Mary Edwards Brown, served as custodian of the Lincoln Homestead, as did her own daughter. Mary's half-sister Emilie Todd married Benjamin Hardin Helm, CSA general and son of the Kentucky Governor John L. Helm.

Another of her half-sisters, Elodie Todd, married CSA Brig. General Nathaniel H. R. Dawson, later the third U.S. Commissioner of Education. One of Mary Todd's cousins was Dakota Territory Congressman/US General John Blair Smith Todd.

== Regard by historians ==
Historians have regarded Lincoln poorly as a first lady, seeing her as meddling and disruptive. Lincoln's poor regard is due to her having been perceived as having psychological conditions that made the life of President Lincoln more difficult. She is seen as having suffered not just from likely mental illness during her husband's presidency, but also from the personal toll that having two of her children die, including one during her husband's presidency, took on her.

Since 1982, Siena College Research Institute has periodically conducted surveys asking historians to assess American first ladies according to a cumulative score on the independent criteria of their background, value to the country, intelligence, courage, accomplishments, integrity, leadership, being their own women, public image, and value to the president. In the first four surveys, Lincoln was ranked in the lowest quartile. However, in the fifth survey (conducted in 2020), Lincoln's regard had risen enough to place her in the third quartile. Lincoln's rise in regard from being ranked as the worst first lady in the first survey to the third quartile in 2020 is perhaps due to an increase in writing on her.

In terms of cumulative assessment, Lincoln has been ranked:

- 42nd-best of 42 in 1982
- 37th-best of 37 in 1993
- 36th-best of 38 in 2003
- 35th-best of 38 in 2008
- 31st-best of 39 in 2014
- 29th-best of 40 in 2020

In the 2008 Siena Research Institute survey, Lincoln was ranked the lowest in four of the ten criteria: value to the country, accomplishments, leadership, and public image. In the 2014 survey, Lincoln and her husband were ranked the seventh-highest out of 39 first couples in terms of being a "power couple".

== See also ==
- Lincoln family tree

== Bibliography ==
- Baker, Jean H. (1987). Mary Todd Lincoln: A Biography. New York: W. W. Norton & Company. ISBN 0393024369.
- Emerson, Jason (2007). The Madness of Mary Lincoln. Carbondale: Southern Illinois University Press. ISBN 978-0-8093-2771-3.
- Packard, Jerrold M. (2013). The Lincolns in the White House: Four Years That Shattered a Family. New York: St. Martin's Press. ISBN 978-0312313029.

Honorary titles
Preceded by Harriet Lane; Acting	First Lady of the United States; 1861–1865	Succeeded by Eliza Johnson
