= India Cholagogue =

India Cholagogue was a 19th-century medicine "Cure for Bilious Illnesses" created and marketed by Charles Osgood within the United States. It was thought to cure and prevent seasonal illnesses by purging bile and miasma from the patient's body.
