= Roseville Plantation =

Roseville Plantation may refer to:

- Roseville Plantation (Florence, South Carolina), listed on the National Register of Historic Places in Florence County, South Carolina
- Roseville Plantation (Aylett, Virginia), listed on the National Register of Historic Places in King William County, Virginia
