= Medicine in the American Civil War =

The state of medical knowledge at the time of the Civil War was quite limited by 21st century standards. Doctors did not understand germs and did little to prevent infection. It was a time before antiseptics, and a time when there was no attempt to maintain sterility during surgery. No antibiotics were available, and minor wounds could easily become infected, and hence fatal. While the typical soldier was at risk of being hit by rifle or artillery fire, he faced an even greater risk of dying from disease.

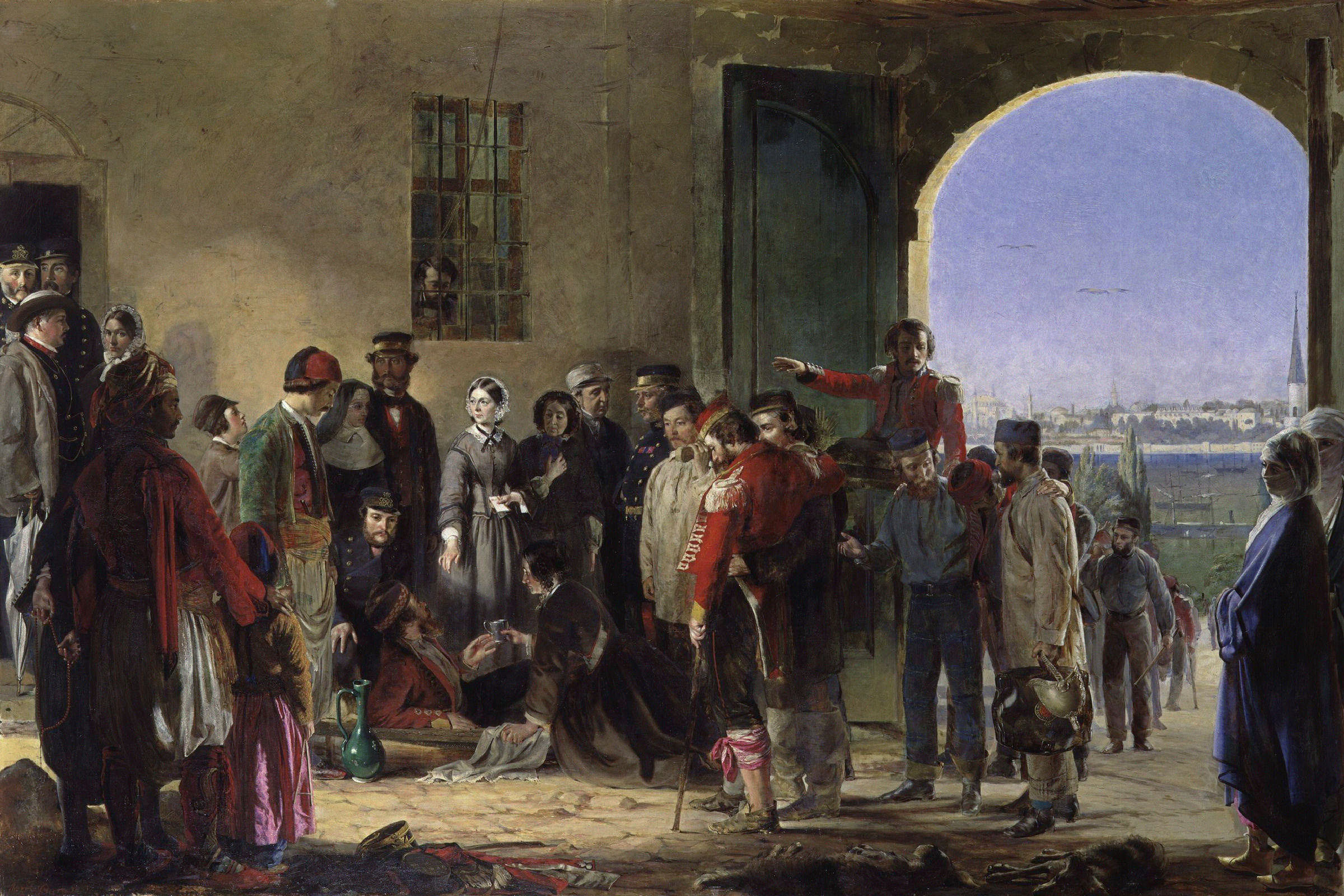
Florence Nightingale Receiving the Wounded at Scutari (Jerry Barrett, 1857)

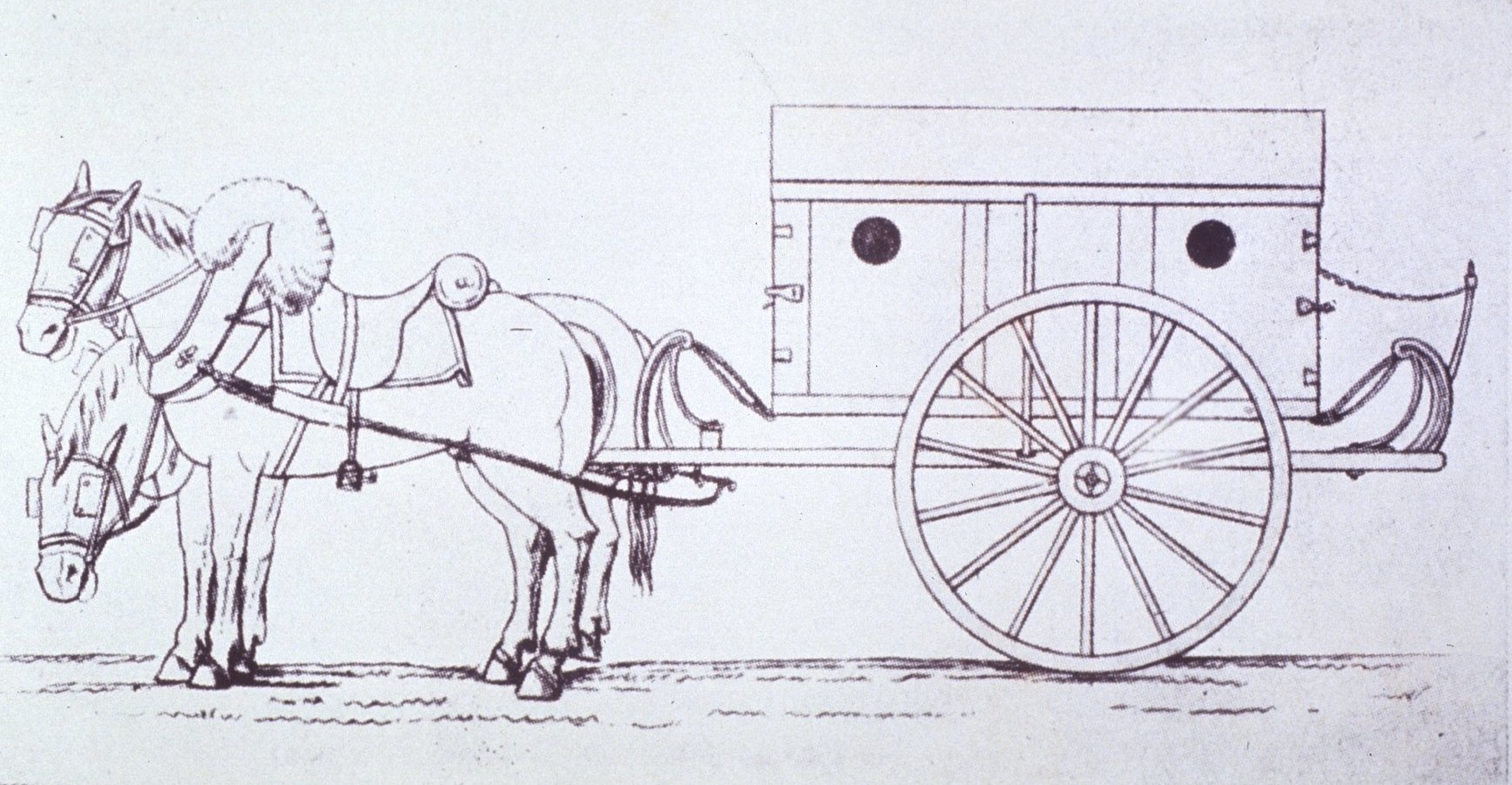
Larrey's ambulance volante, used to evacuate casualties from the battlefield

== Background ==
French doctor Dominique Larrey made advances in military medicine during the 1789-1799 French Revolution and the 1800-1815 Napoleonic Wars, developing the modern methods of army surgery, field hospitals and the system of army ambulance corps.

Conditions at military hospitals during the 1853-56 Crimean War were improved by the British civilian volunteers led by Florence Nightingale and the British military doctor James Barry. Yet reforms in the care of wounded soldiers came slowly. A historical comparison gives some idea of the scale of casualties.

== Union ==
The hygiene of the camps was poor, especially at the beginning of the war when men who had seldom been far from home were brought together for training with thousands of strangers. First came epidemics of the childhood diseases of chicken pox, mumps, whooping cough, and, especially, measles. Operations in the South meant a dangerous and new disease environment, bringing diarrhea, dysentery, typhoid fever, and malaria. There were no antibiotics, so the surgeons prescribed coffee, whiskey, and quinine. Harsh weather, bad water, inadequate shelter in winter quarters, poor policing of camps and dirty camp hospitals took their toll. This was a common scenario in wars from time immemorial, and conditions faced by the Confederate army were even worse.

When the war began, there were no plans in place to treat wounded or sick Union soldiers. After the Battle of Bull Run, the United States government took possession of several private hospitals in Washington, D.C., Alexandria, Virginia, and surrounding towns. Union commanders believed the war would be short and there would be no need to create a long-standing source of care for the army's medical needs. This view changed after the appointment of General George B. McClellan and the organization of the Army of the Potomac. McClellan appointed the first medical director of the army, surgeon Charles S. Tripler, on August 12, 1861. Tripler created plans to enlist regimental surgeons to travel with armies in the field, and the creation of general hospitals for the badly wounded to be taken to for recovery and further treatment. To implement the plan, orders were issued on May 25 that each regiment must recruit one surgeon and one assistant surgeon to serve before they could be deployed for duty. These men served in the initial makeshift regimental hospitals. In 1862 William A. Hammond became surgeon general and launched a series of reforms. He founded the Army Medical Museum, and had plans for a hospital and a medical school in Washington; a central laboratory for chemical and pharmaceutical preparations was created; much more extensive recording was required from the hospitals and the surgeons. Hammond raised the requirements for admission into the Army Medical Corps. The number of hospitals was greatly increased, and he paid close attention to aeration. New surgeons were promoted to serving at the brigade level with the rank of major. The surgeon majors were assigned staffs and were charged with overseeing a new brigade-level hospital that could serve as an intermediary level between the regimental and general hospitals. Surgeon majors were also charged with ensuring that regimental surgeons were in compliance with the orders issued by the medical director of the army.

In the Union skilled, well-funded medical organizers took proactive action, especially in the much enlarged United States Army Medical Department, and the United States Sanitary Commission, a new private agency. Numerous other new agencies also targeted the medical and morale needs of soldiers, including the United States Christian Commission as well as smaller private agencies such as the Women's Central Association of Relief for Sick and Wounded in the army (WCAR) founded in 1861 by Henry Whitney Bellows, and Dorothea Dix. Systematic funding appeals raised public consciousness, as well as millions of dollars. Many thousands of volunteers worked in the hospitals and rest homes, most famously poet Walt Whitman. Frederick Law Olmsted, a famous landscape architect, was the highly efficient executive director of the Sanitary Commission.

Field hospital of the 3rd Division, 2nd Corps in Brandy Station, VA in 1864

States could use their own tax money to support their troops as Ohio did. Following the unexpected carnage at the battle of Shiloh in April 1862, the Ohio state government sent three steamboats to the scene as floating hospitals with doctors, nurses and medical supplies. The state fleet expanded to eleven hospital ships. The state also set up 12 local offices in main transportation nodes to help Ohio soldiers moving back and forth.

Field hospitals were initially in the open air, with tent hospitals that could hold only six patients first being used in 1862; after many major battles the injured had to receive their care in the open. As the war progressed, nurses were enlisted, generally two per regiment. In the general hospitals one nurse was employed for about every ten patients. The first permanent general hospitals were ordered constructed during December 1861 in the major hubs of military activity in the eastern and western United States. An elaborate system of ferrying wounded and sick soldiers from the brigade hospitals to the general hospitals was set up. At first the system proved to be insufficient, and many soldiers were dying in mobile hospitals at the front and could not be transported to the general hospitals for needed care. The situation became apparent to military leaders in the Peninsular Campaign in June 1862 when several thousand soldiers died for lack of medical treatment. Dr. Jonathan Letterman was appointed to succeed Tripler as the second medical director of the army in 1862 and completed the process of putting together a new ambulance corps. Each regiment was assigned two wagons, one carrying medical supplies, and a second to serve as a transport for wounded soldiers. The ambulance corps was placed under the command of Surgeon Majors of the various brigades. In August 1863 the number of transport wagons was increased to three per regiment.

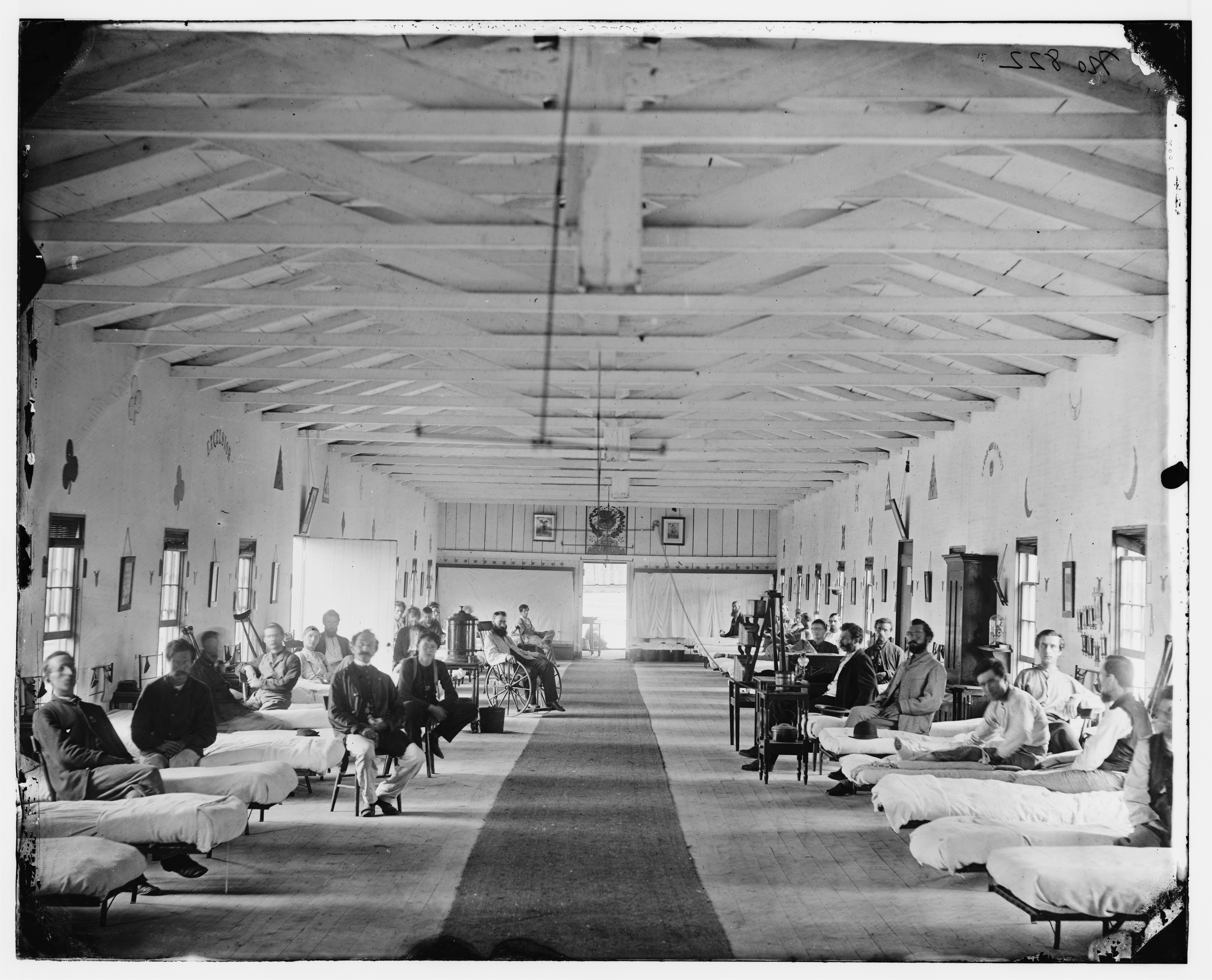
Patients in Ward K of Armory Square Hospital in Washington, DC in 1865

Union medical care improved dramatically during 1862. By the end of the year each regiment was being regularly supplied with a standard set of medical supplies included medical books, supplies of medicine, small hospital furniture like bedpans, containers for mixing medicines, spoons, vials, bedding, lanterns, and numerous other implements. A new layer of medical treatment was added in January 1863. A division level hospital was established under the command of a Surgeon-in-Chief. The new divisional hospitals took over the role of the brigade hospitals as a rendezvous point for transports to the general hospitals. The wagons transported the wounded to nearby railroad depots where they could be quickly transported to the general hospitals at the military supply hubs. The divisional hospitals were given large staffs, nurses, cooks, several doctors, and large tents to accommodate up to one hundred soldiers each. The new division hospitals began keeping detailed medical records of patients. The divisional hospitals were established at a safe distance from battlefields where patients could be safely helped after transport from the regimental or brigade hospitals.

Although the divisional hospitals were placed in safe locations, because of their size they could not be quickly packed in the event of a retreat. Several divisional hospitals were lost to Confederates during the war, but in almost all occasions their patients and doctors were immediately paroled if they would swear to no longer bear arms in the conflict. On a few occasions, the hospitals and patients were held several days and exchanged for Confederate prisoners of war.

Both armies learned many lessons during the war. In 1886, the U.S. established the United States Army Hospital Corps. The Sanitary Commission collected enormous amounts of statistical data and improved the means of storing and accessing information for research.

== Confederacy ==
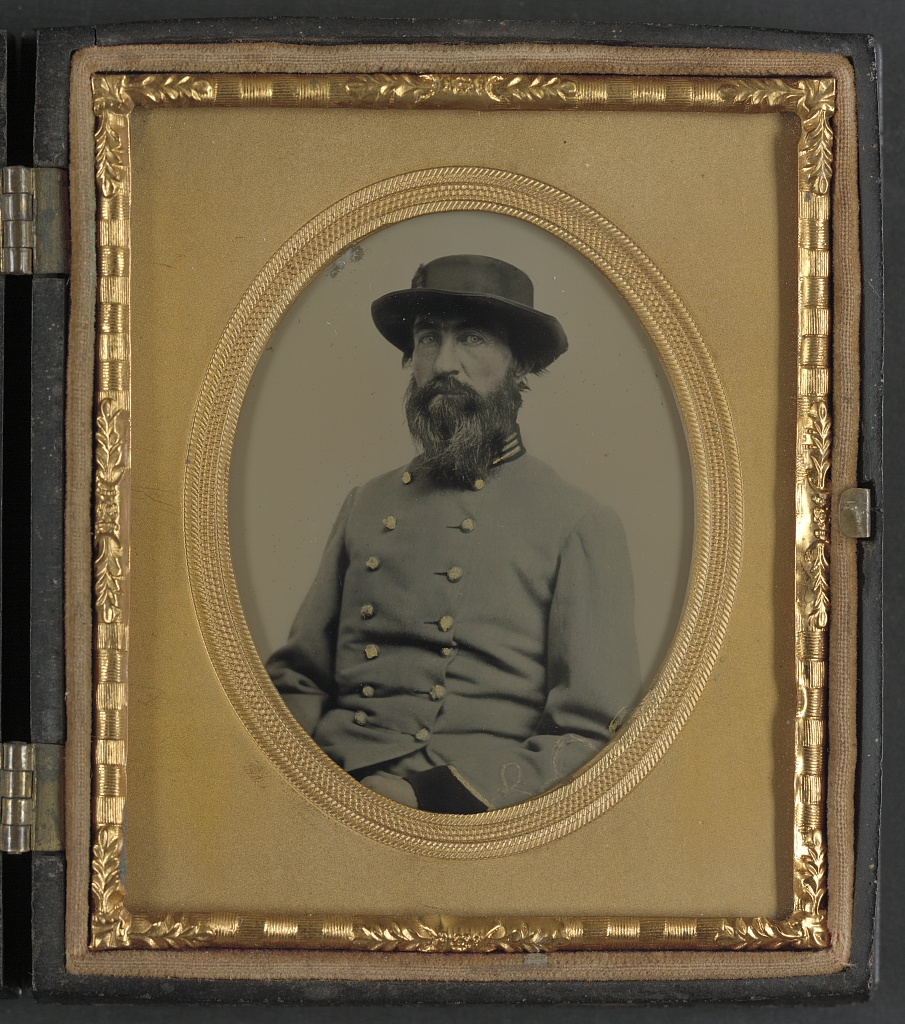
Captain in Confederate uniform with black cuffs indicating surgeon. From the Library of Congress Prints and Photographs division, Liljenquist Family Collection of Civil War Photographs

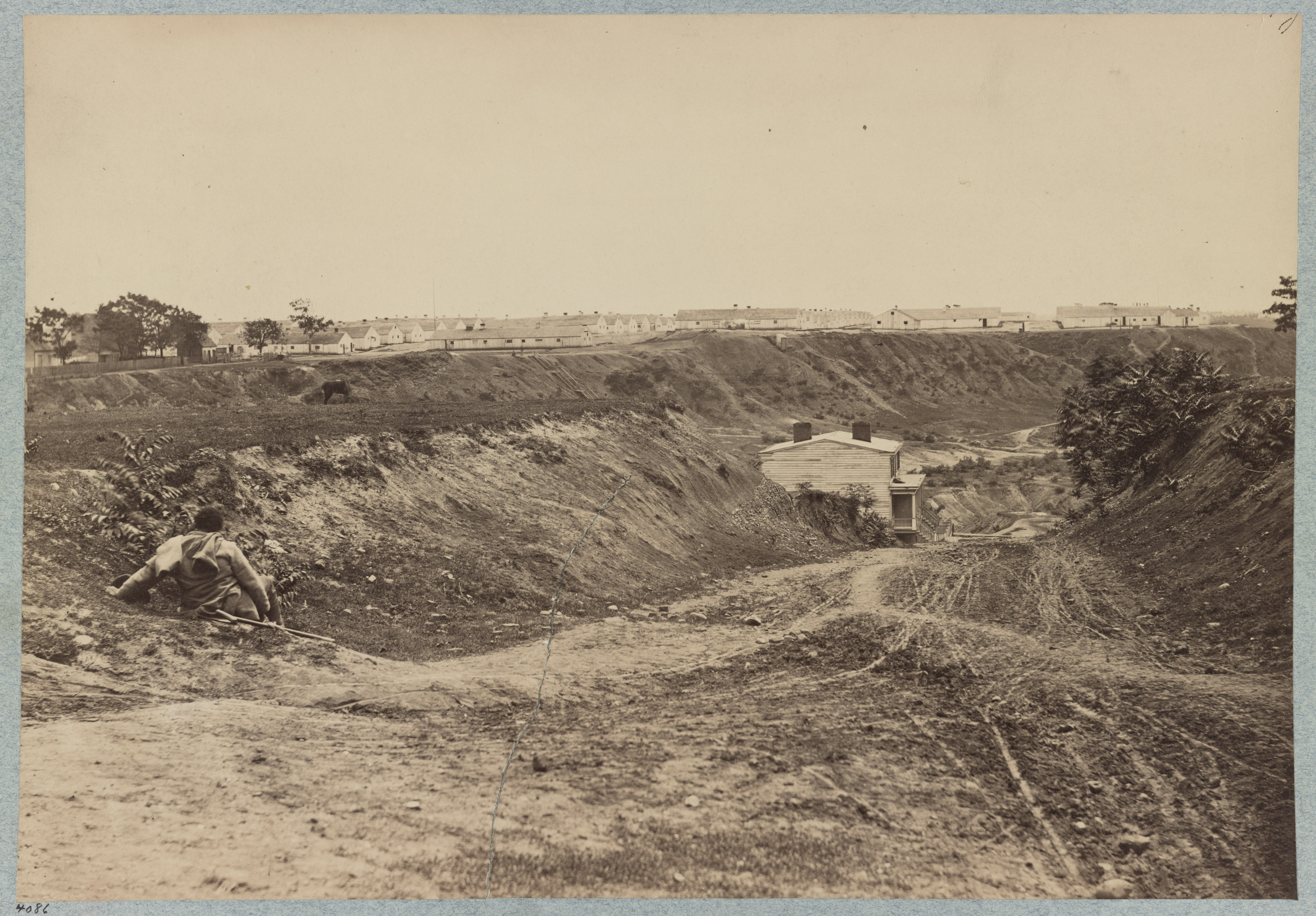
Confederate Chimborazo Hospital in April, 1865 in Richmond, VA

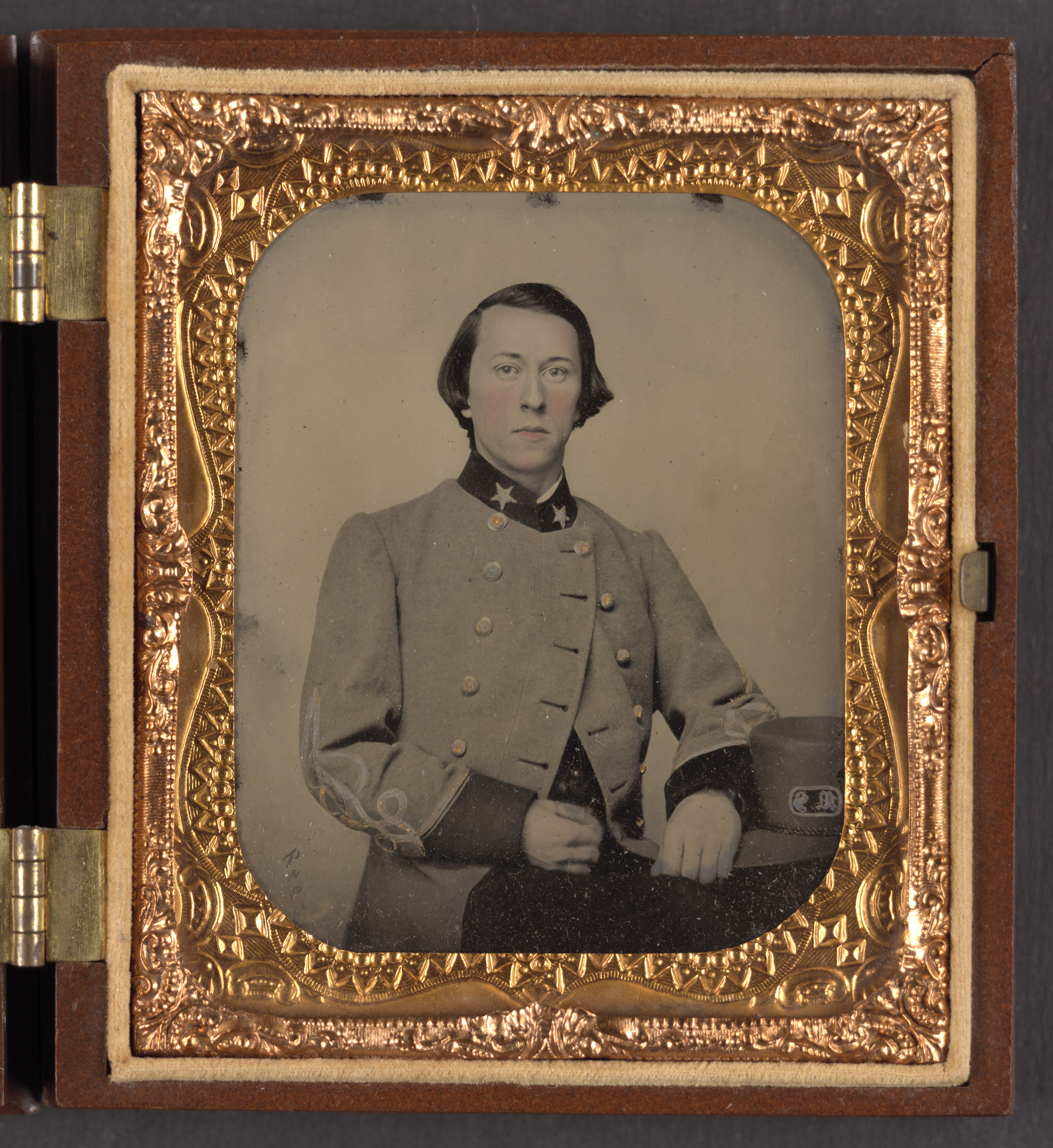
Dr. Edmund Lewis Massie of Trans-Mississippi Department, Medical Staff Confederate States Infantry Regiment

The Confederacy was quicker to authorize the establishment of a medical corps than the Union, but the Confederate medical corp was at a considerable disadvantage throughout the war primarily due to the lesser resources of the Confederate government. A Medical Department was created with the initial army structure by the provisional Confederate government on February 26, 1861. President Jefferson Davis appointed David C. DeLeon Surgeon General. Although a leadership for a medical corp was created, an error by the copyist in the creation of the military regulations of the Confederacy omitted the section for medical officers, and none were mustered into their initial regiments. Many physicians enlisted in the army as privates, and when the error was discovered in April, many of the physicians were pressed into serving as regimental surgeons.

DeLeon had little experience with military medicine, and he and his staff of twenty-five began creating plans to implement army-wide medical standards. The Confederate government appropriated money to purchase hospitals to serve the army, and the development of field services began after the First Battle of Manassas. The early hospitals were quickly overrun by wounded, and hundreds had to be sent by train to other southern cities for care following the battle. As a result of the poor planning, Davis demoted DeLeon and replaced him with Samuel Preston Moore. Moore had more experience than DeLeon and quickly moved to speed the implementation of medical standards. Because many of the surgeons in the regiments had been pressed into service, some were not qualified to be surgeons. Moore began reviewing the surgeons and replacing those found to be inadequate for their duties.

Initially the Confederacy employed a policy of furloughing wounded soldiers to return home for recovery. This was a result of their lack of field hospitals and limited capacity in their general hospitals. In August 1861, the army began the construction of new larger hospitals in several southern cities, and the furloughing policy was gradually halted. The earliest recruits for surgeons were required to bring their own supplies, a practice that was ended during 1862. The government began providing each regiment with a pack with medical supplies including medicines and surgical instruments. The Confederacy, however, had limited access to medicinal supplies and relied on their blockade-running ships to import needed medicines from Europe, supplies captured from the North or traded with the North through Memphis. Anesthetics were not in as short supply as medical instruments, something highly prized. Field hospitals were set up at the regimental level and located in an open area behind the lines of battle and staffed by two surgeons, one being senior. It was the responsibility of the regimental surgeons to determine which soldiers could return to duty and which should be sent to the general hospitals. There were no intermediary hospitals, and each regiment was responsible for transporting its wounded to the nearest rail depot, where the injured were transported to the general hospitals for longer-term care. In some of the lengthier battles, buildings were seized to serve as a temporary secondary hospital at a divisional level where the severely wounded could be held. The secondary facilities were staffed by the regimental surgeons, who pooled their resources to care for the wounded and were oversaw by a divisional surgeon.

== Ambulance system ==
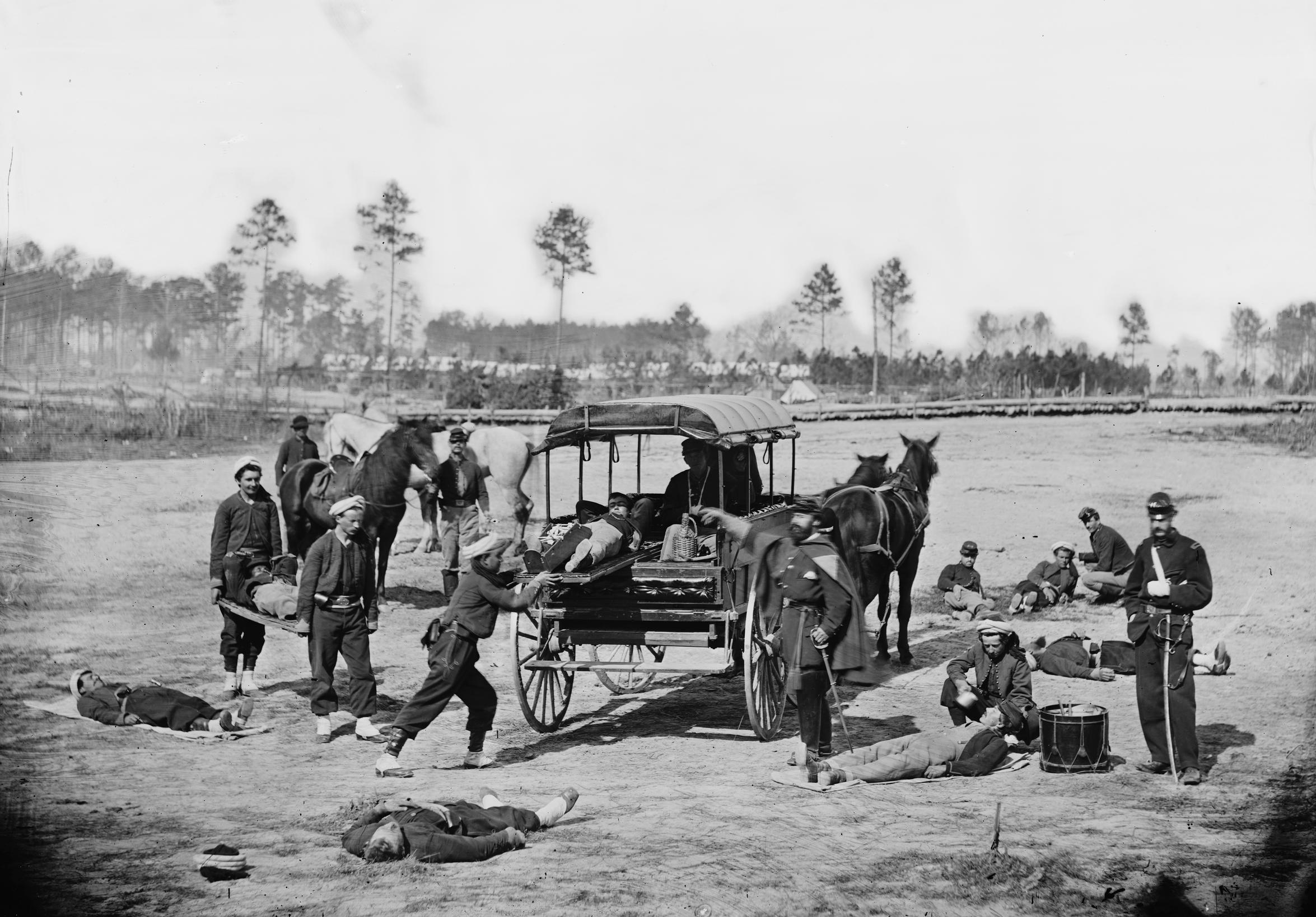
Ambulance drill being demonstrated at Headquarters Army of Potomac after the Battle of Antietam and the formation of the ambulance corps. (March 1864)

After seeing the speed with which the carriages of French horse artillery units maneuvered across the battlefields, French doctor Dominique Larrey adapted them as "flying ambulances" for rapid transport of the wounded. However, a significant number of Union and Confederate soldiers lost their lives on the battlefield in wait for medical aid before the formation of any organized ambulance system for US troops. Even if an army were able to overcome the shortage of ambulances, it was really the lack of organization that made it difficult to recover the wounded on the battlefield. In some cases, those who manned the ambulances were corrupt and sought to steal from the ambulance wagon and the wounded passengers while in some situations they even refused to gather hurt soldiers. With an insufficient number of ambulances performing assigned tasks, the wounded looked to their comrades to carry them to safety and in essence this removed many soldiers from the battlefield. Owing to the overall lightness of the ambulance the ride was very uncomfortable for wounded soldiers, with the terrain being torn up by shells and explosions the ambulance at times would overturn further harming its passengers. It was obvious that the ambulance system needed work for both the Union and the Confederate armies, yet only the Union would fully prosper in this area with the help of Dr. Jonathan Letterman and the beginning stages of the ambulance corps.

Letterman's revolutionary ideas dramatically improved both the ambulance and the ambulance system. With new designs the common Union ambulance was now composed of a 750-pound wagon that was powered by 2 to 4 horses and was made to carry 2 to 6 wounded soldiers. Other accessories that were standard for the improved ambulances included compartments to store medical supplies, stretchers, water, and even removable benches and seats to adapt to the number of passengers. Letterman's ideas improved the ambulance system dramatically by setting standards to train the ambulance crew, by having routine ambulance inspections, and also by developing strategical evacuation plans to most efficiently save and transport fallen soldiers. Letterman's system was so efficient that all wounded soldiers at The Battle of Antietam were removed from the battlefield and sent to care within one day so this new system saved thousands of Union lives. Soon after The Battle of Antietam began the formation of the ambulance corps and while the Confederates were also working out a similar system their constant shortage of ambulances was not adequate enough to summon such an effective force as even some their ambulances came by capturing Union ambulances.

== Soldiers ==
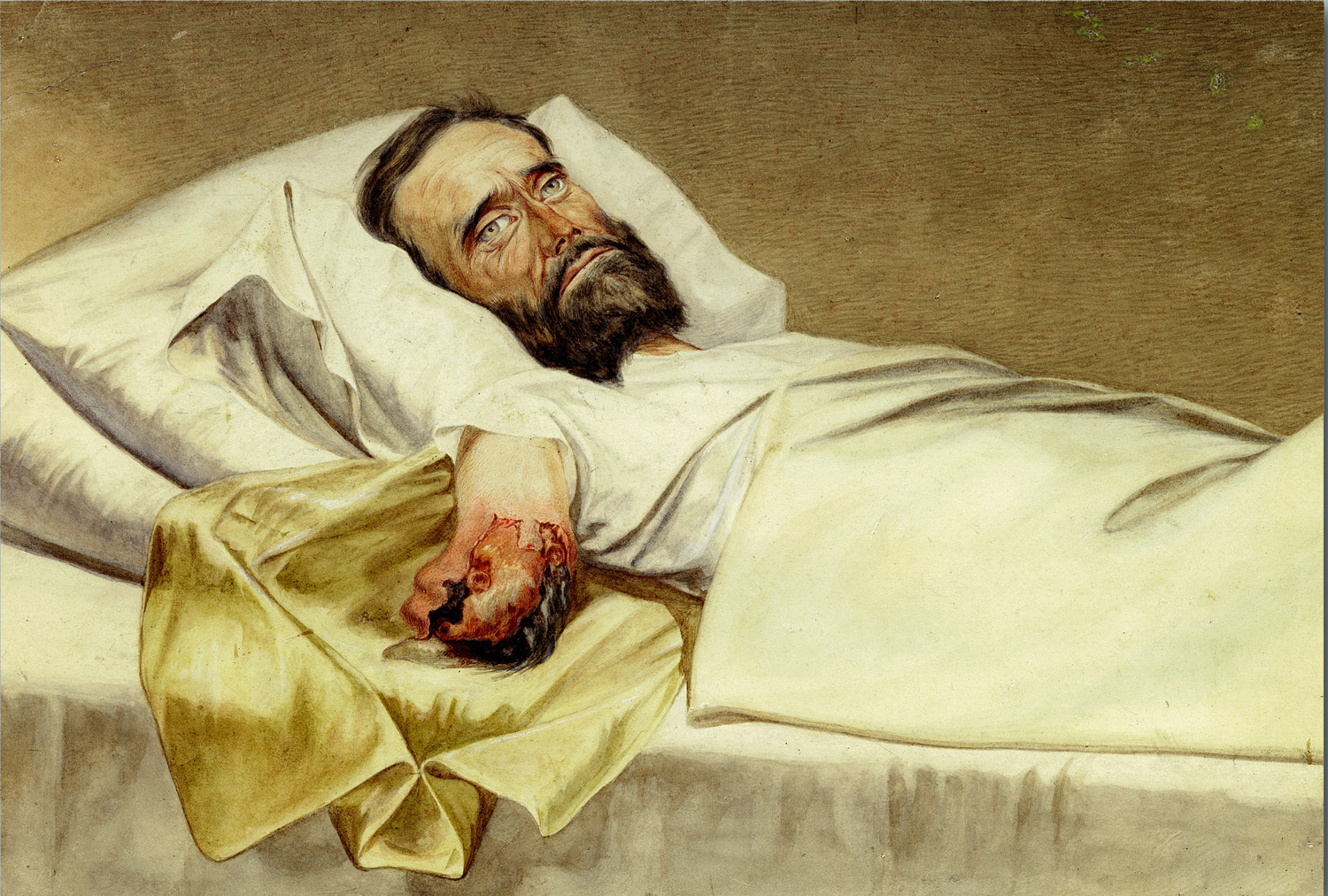
Period painting of an American Civil War soldier, wounded by a Minié ball, lies in bed with a gangrenous amputated arm.

The most common battlefield injury was being wounded by enemy fire. Unless the wounds were minor, this often led to amputation of limbs to prevent infection from setting in, as antibiotics had not yet been discovered. Amputations had to be made at the point above where the wound occurred, often leaving men with stub limbs. A flap of skin was saved and stitched to the stump to cover the wound. There were two types of amputations, primary and secondary. The primary amputation was done between 24 and 48 hours after the injury. The secondary amputation was done after a longer period of time, often because of infection. During this time, there were two main methods of amputation, the flap method and circular method. The flap method was typically used when an amputation had to be done quickly. The bone was cut above flaps of skin and muscle, which were pulled together to close the wound. The circular method was a circular cut that only allowed a flap of surface skin to cover the wound. The flap method was more likely than the circular method to lead to gangrene, as the deep muscle tissue suffered from lack of circulation. Approximately 30,000 amputations were performed during the Civil War.

Patients were generally sedated prior to a surgical operation. The use of ether as general anesthesia started in 1846 and the use of chloroform in 1847. Contrary to popular belief, few soldiers experienced amputation without any anesthetic. A post-war review by the U.S. Army Medical Department found that over 99.6% of surgeries performed by their staff were conducted under some form of general anesthesia. Surgeons preferred chloroform in field hospitals, while ether was more common relegated to general hospitals well beyond the range of fighting due to its explosive nature. The most popular anesthetic agent was chloroform, accounting for more than 70% of all surgeries in the North according to a study in the Medical and Surgical History of the War of the Rebellion. Ether was more commonly used behind the lines because it required a heavier dosage, took longer to induce insensibility, and was highly flammable. In some cases, a blend of ether and chloroform was used to sedate patients. When properly done, the patient would feel no pain during their surgery, but there was no structured system like the modern phases of anesthesia for gauging the proper dosage and depth of a patient's amnesia, analgesia, and muscle relaxation. In some cases, patients were insensible to pain, but did not experience amnesia. Stonewall Jackson, for example, recalled the sound of the saw cutting through the bone of his arm, but recalled no pain.

Infection was the most common cause of death of injured soldiers. Infection occurred for a variety of reasons. Surgeons would typically go from surgery to surgery without cleaning their equipment or their hands; surgeons would use sponges that they only rinsed in water on multiple patients. These practices caused bacteria to spread from patient to patient, from all surgical surfaces, and from the environment, which caused infections in many.

The American Civil War was the first "modern war" in terms of technology and lethality of weapons. "It was a conflict that prefigured our own time in its unanticipated scale and scope, in its incorporation of rapidly advancing technologies of firepower, transportation, and communication." However it was simultaneously fought "at the very end of the medical 'Middle Ages.'" Very little was known about the causes of disease, and so a minor wound could easily become infected and take a life. Battlefield surgeons were underqualified, and hospitals were generally poorly supplied and staffed. In fact, there were so many wounded and not enough doctors, so doctors were forced to spend only a little time with each patient. They became proficient at quick care. Some surgeons spent as little as 10 minutes on amputating a limb. The most common battlefield operation was amputation. If a soldier was badly wounded in the arm or leg, amputation was usually the only solution. About 75 percent of amputees survived the operation.

A 2016 research paper found that Civil War surgery was effective at improving patient health outcomes. The study finds that "in many cases [surgery] amounted to a doubling of the odds of survival".

If a wound produced pus, it was thought that it meant the wound was healing, when in fact it meant the injury was infected. Specifically, if the pus was white and thick, the doctors thought it was a good sign. Roughly three out of five Union casualties and two out of three Confederate casualties died of disease.

== Women as nurses ==
North and South, over 20,000 women volunteered to work in hospitals, usually in nursing care. They assisted surgeons during procedures, gave medicines, supervised the feedings and cleaned the bedding and clothes. They gave a good cheer, wrote letters the men dictated, and comforted the dying.

The Sanitary Commission handled most of the nursing care of the Union armies, together with the necessary acquisition and transportation of medical supplies. Dorothea Dix, serving as the commission's Superintendent, was able to convince the medical corps of the value of women working in 350 Commission or army hospitals. A representative nurse was Helen L. Gilson (1835–68) of Chelsea, Massachusetts, who served in the Sanitary Commission. She supervised supplies, dressed wounds, and cook special foods for patients on a limited diet. She worked in hospitals after Antietam, Fredericksburg, Chancellorsville, and Gettysburg battles. She was a successful administrator, especially at the hospital for black soldiers at City Point, Virginia. The middle-class women North and South who volunteered provided vitally needed nursing services and were rewarded with a sense of patriotism and civic duty in addition to the opportunity to demonstrate their skills and gain new ones, while receiving wages and sharing the hardships of the men.

Mary Livermore, Mary Ann Bickerdyke, and Annie Wittenmeyer played leadership roles. After the war some nurses wrote memoirs of their experiences; examples include Dix, Livermore, Sarah Palmer Young, Ada White Bacot, and Sarah Emma Edmonds.

Several thousand women were just as active in nursing in the Confederacy but were less well organized and faced severe shortages of supplies and a much weaker system of 150 hospitals. Nursing and vital support services were provided not only by matrons and nurses, but also by local volunteers, slaves, free blacks, and prisoners of war.

== Hospital Stewards ==
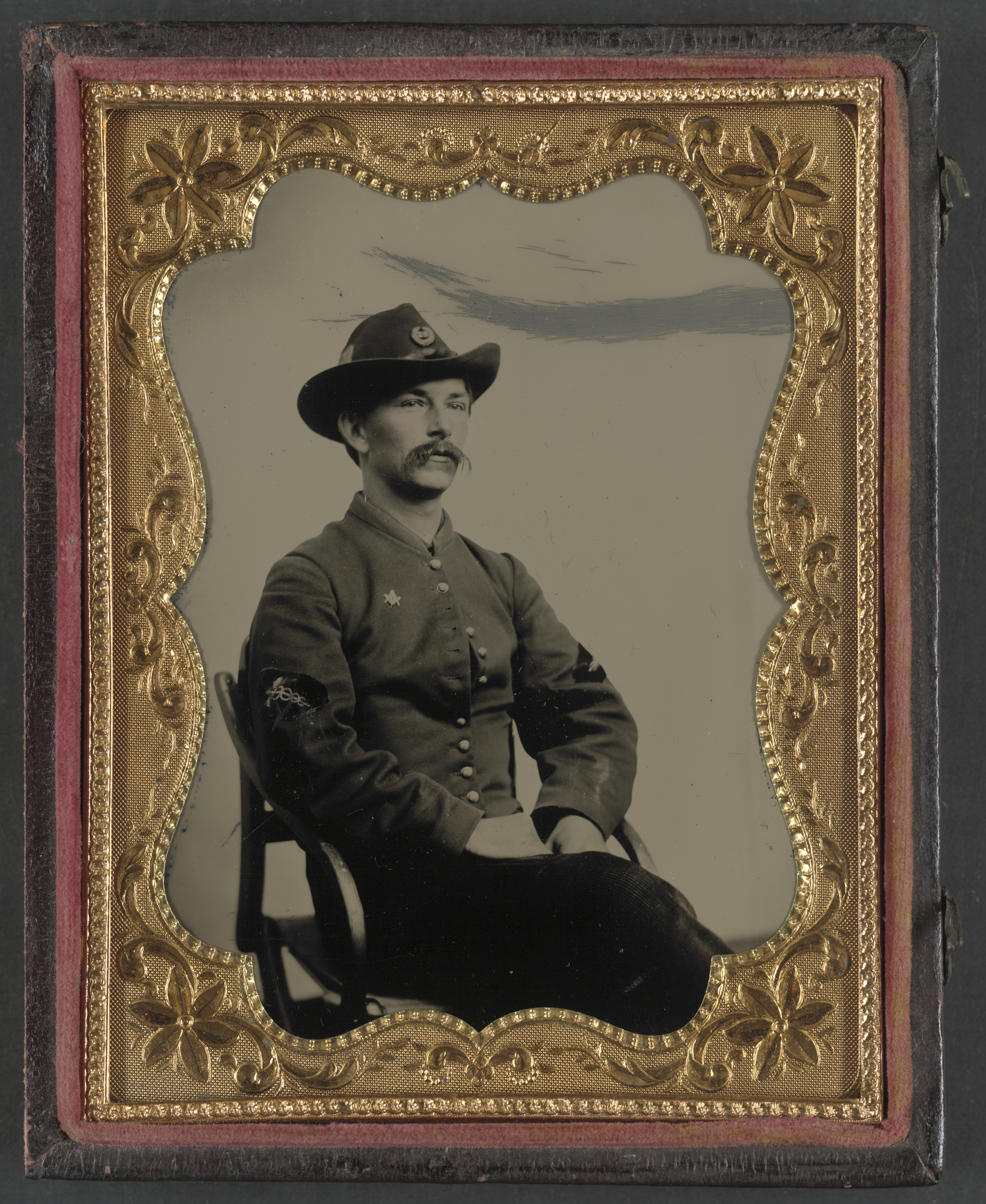
Union hospital steward in uniform.

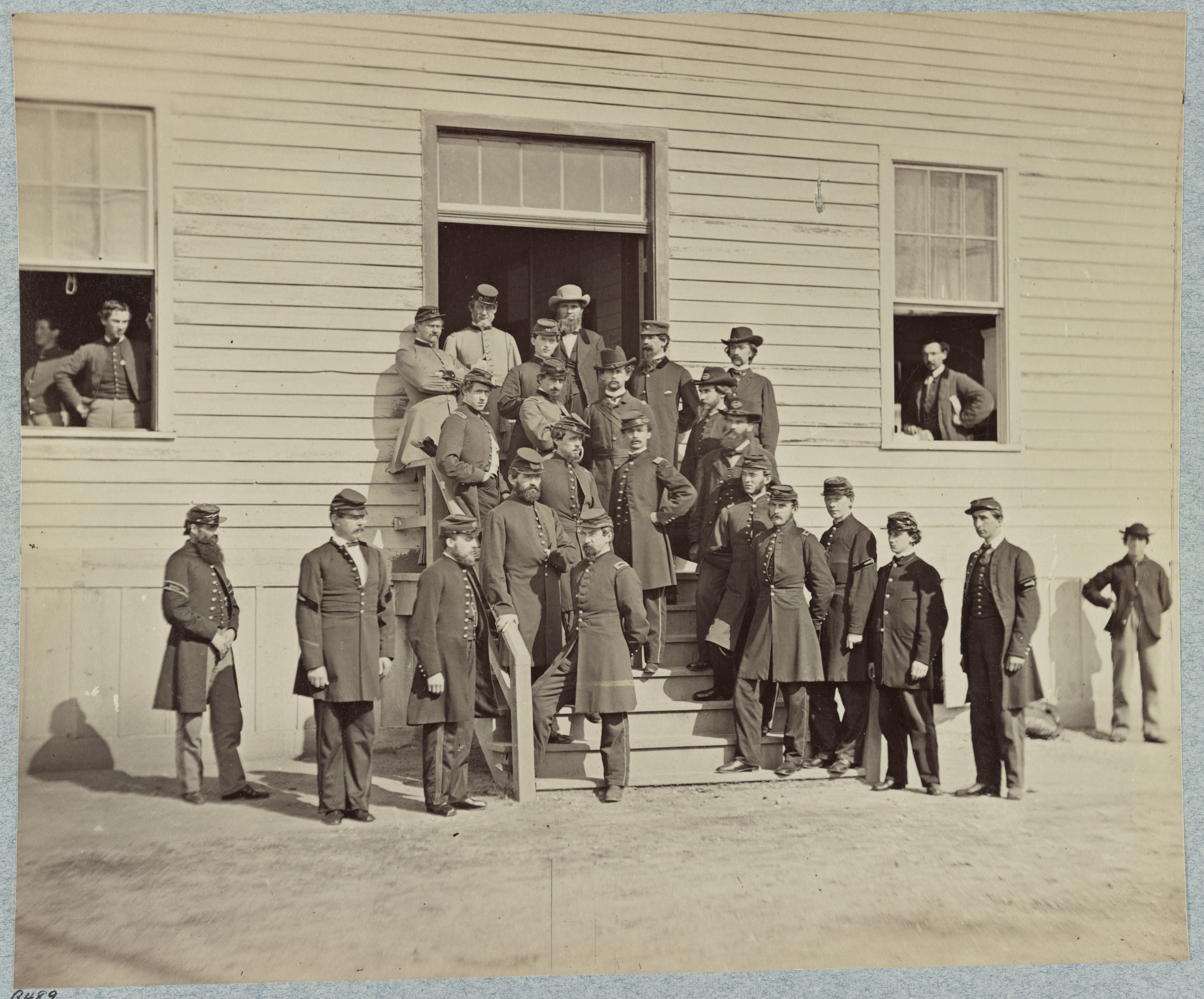
Hospital stewards and surgeons in uniform at Harewood Hospital.

During the civil war the role of hospital stewards was integral to medicine in the civil war and the operation of hospitals. First becoming a role in the military medical field in the late 1700's to early 1800's, they were assigned very important tasks, taking the role of a pharmacists in the army, a term used and adopted later, and to generally act as hospital administrators. In addition to having to fill out the prescriptions for the people in the hospitals, they were also in charge of mixing and creating the drugs and medicine for the patients themselves. As part of administrative duties they also had to keep inventory of the supplies and keep and make the medical records of the hospital. Despite being such a necessary and vital part to hospitals, the numerous standards and requirements set for someone to be hired in this position were so high only a select few could become a steward. These included things such as being well educated in pharmaceutical practices, minor education in surgical procedures, be able to cook, the application of bandages, cups, and leeches. These requirements went even further recommending that stewards be younger, intelligent and healthy men with good natures. To ensure that candidates met their desired standards they gave potential candidates exams and checked for any previous experience in medical or medicinal fields. Ultimately, the selected candidates were men who scored the highest on the exams and had the experience working in the field before. Because of this process to select the best candidates, hospitals would only ever have one or two stewards assigned to the entire building, leading to them being heavily overworked with their duties.

== Freed slaves and civilians ==
Historian Leon Litwack has noted, "Neither white nor black Southerners were unaffected by the physical and emotional demands of the war. Scarcities of food and clothing, for example, imposed hardships on both races." Conditions were worse for blacks. Late in the war and soon after large numbers of blacks moved away from the plantation. The Freedmen's Bureau refugee camps saw infectious disease such as smallpox reach epidemic proportions. Jim Downs states:

Disease and sickness had more devastating and fatal effects on emancipated slaves than on soldiers, since ex-slaves often lacked the basic necessities to survive. Emancipation liberated bondspeople from slavery, but they often lacked clean clothing, adequate shelter, proper food, and access to medicine in their escape toward Union lines. Many free slaves died once they secured refuge behind union camps

== New Practices Adopted During the War ==
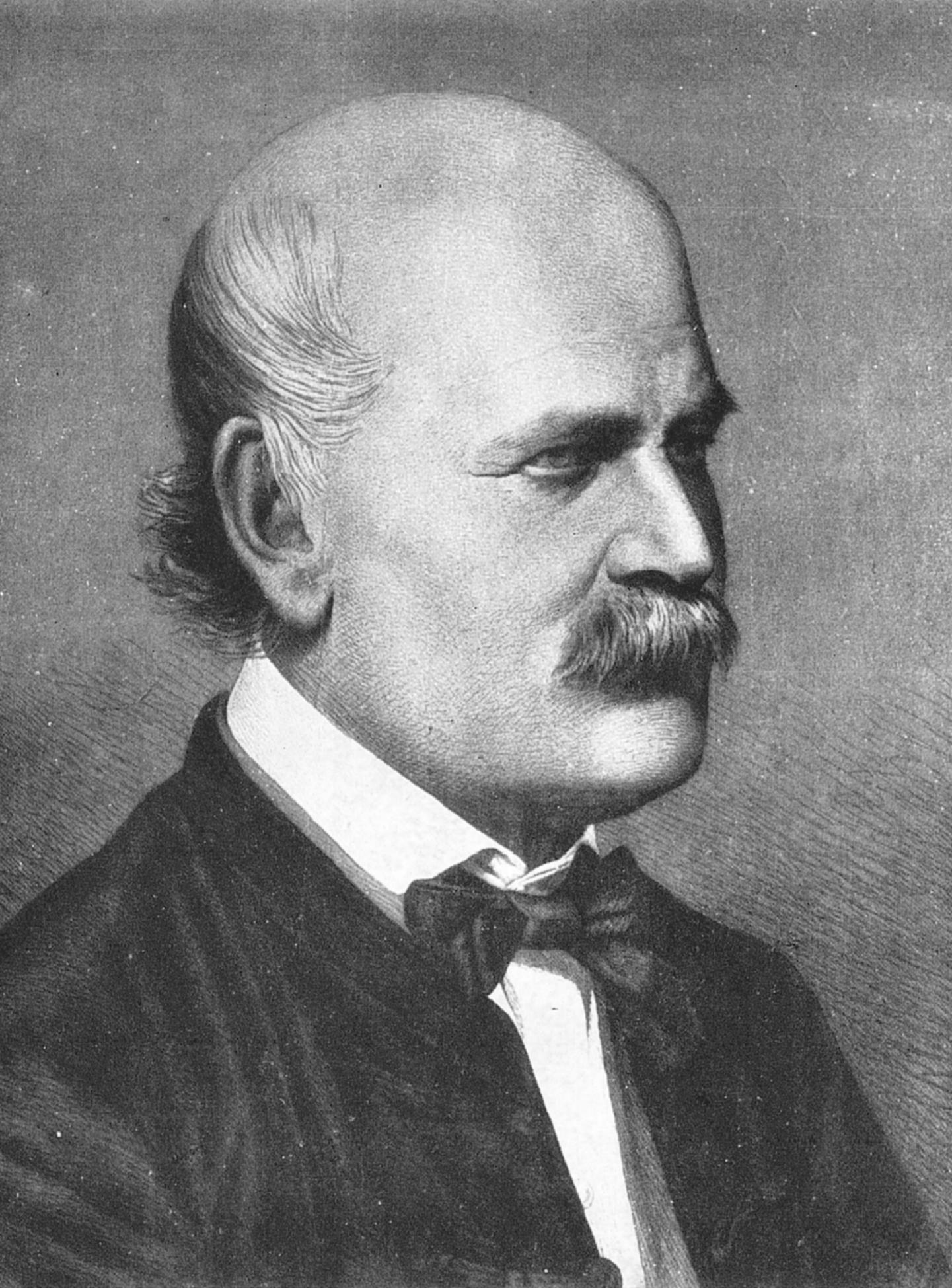
Ignaz Semmelweis

Many new medicinal and medical practices were adopted during the civil war. One such practice was sterilization to clean and sanitize tools between medical procedures. Ignaz Semmelweis, a physician from Vienna, discovered in 1847 that contaminated materials transmitted diseases among patients. Although the medical community initially ignored this, medical professionals came to realize its importance and started to implement preventions in their practices. This led to Joseph Lister, a British surgeon, developing a method of sterilization to clean tools in the 1860s by soaking the medical tools in carbolic acid. Many physicians in Britain were slow to use this practice, but it became more widely used by medical professionals in America.

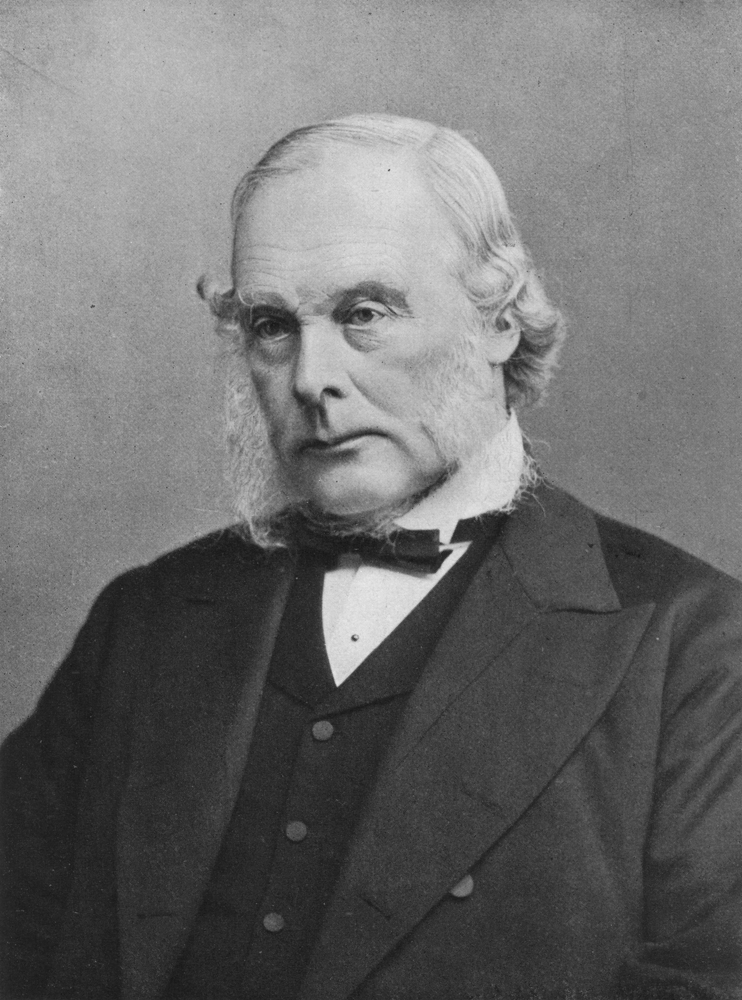
Joseph Lister

Additional modern medicinal practices were also starting to be used, such as the analysis of cells under a microscope. In 1863, in an attempt to treat a soldier's wounds, physicians decided to use a microscope to see if they could learn anything more about the infection and status of the wound. They saw what they called "diseased cells" and "infusorial animalcules". Through further tests and microscopic analyses they found a remedy that seemed to help kill the infection and enable them to treat a soldier's wounds. The case was recorded and was one of many that led to microscopes being used routinely in modern medicine.

Medical research also became more pronounced in this time as states began passing laws that allowed medical schools to use unclaimed bodies for research purposes. This coupled with the injuries brought on by the war allowed for doctors to develop better understandings of the nature of the injuries and diseases. As a result, medical professionals shifted their focus from just the physical aspects of diseases to more inquisitive methods of figuring out their nature as well.

== Aftermath ==
Based on their experiences in the war, many veterans went on to develop high standards for medical care and new medicines. The medical profession had grown significantly to number thousands of medical professionals across the nation as the modern pharmaceutical industry began developing in the decades after the war. Colonel Eli Lilly had been a pharmacist; he built a pharmaceutical empire after the war. Clara Barton founded the American Red Cross to provide civilian nursing services in wartime.

== See also ==
- Bibliography of the American Civil War#Medical
- History of nursing in the United States
- National Museum of Civil War Medicine
- Military medicine
- Union (American Civil War)#Medical conditions
