= U.S. Ambulance Corps =

Unit of the Union Army during the American Civil War

The U.S. Ambulance Corps was a unit of the Union Army during the American Civil War. The Ambulance Corps was initially formed as a unit only within the Army of the Potomac, due to the effort of several Army officials, notably Dr. Jonathan Letterman, medical director of the Army of the Potomac, and William Hammond, the U.S. Surgeon-General. Until August 1862, the lack of trained ambulance drivers meant that the wounded had to wait a long time to receive medical care. This changed during the Battle of Antietam in September 1862 when his new system allowed the wounded men to be transferred quickly and prevent a larger amount of deaths.

== History ==
Early in the Civil War, no organized system of battlefield evacuation existed. Each regiment was responsible for transporting the wounded back to a local field hospital, creating a muddled system where wounded men could suffer on the battlefield for over a week. There was also no overall plan or doctrine for the evacuation of casualties to a general hospital. Ambulance drivers were generally either soldiers taken from other duties or civilian wagon drivers pulled from the streets of Washington DC. Tasking soldiers to this role reduced the fighting strength of their unit, and often they would not return to their unit until after the fighting had subsided. Civilian drivers in particular were reportedly insubordinate, drunk or appropriated space inside the ambulances for non-medical use.

With respect to the individual vehicles, the Army initially needed to round up commercial wagons to serve as ambulances. Consequently, many ambulances fled without retrieving any casualties during the First Battle of Bull Run, leaving many wounded soldiers to fend for themselves. It subsequently took several days for the Union Army to organize a wagon train with staff to identify and remove the casualties.

Various proposals for the creation of a formal ambulance corps were made in the first years of the Civil War. Charles Stuart Tripler, medical director of the Army of the Potomac, requested that an ambulance corps be created in the fall of 1861 but his recommendation was not acted on, leaving the situation unchanged through the early part of 1862. In Missouri, surgeon John H. Brinton reported that the lack of adequate evacuation capability had caused the abandonment of the wounded, with many subsequently captured. He was able to organize regimental ambulance trains each under the command of a non-commissioned officer. The United States Sanitary Commission lobbied heavily for the creation of an ambulance regiment and backed the appointment of William A. Hammond as Surgeon General. Hammond was in favor of an ambulance corps, but this was opposed by General-in-chief Henry Halleck, who worried it would lead to a larger train that would slow down the army.

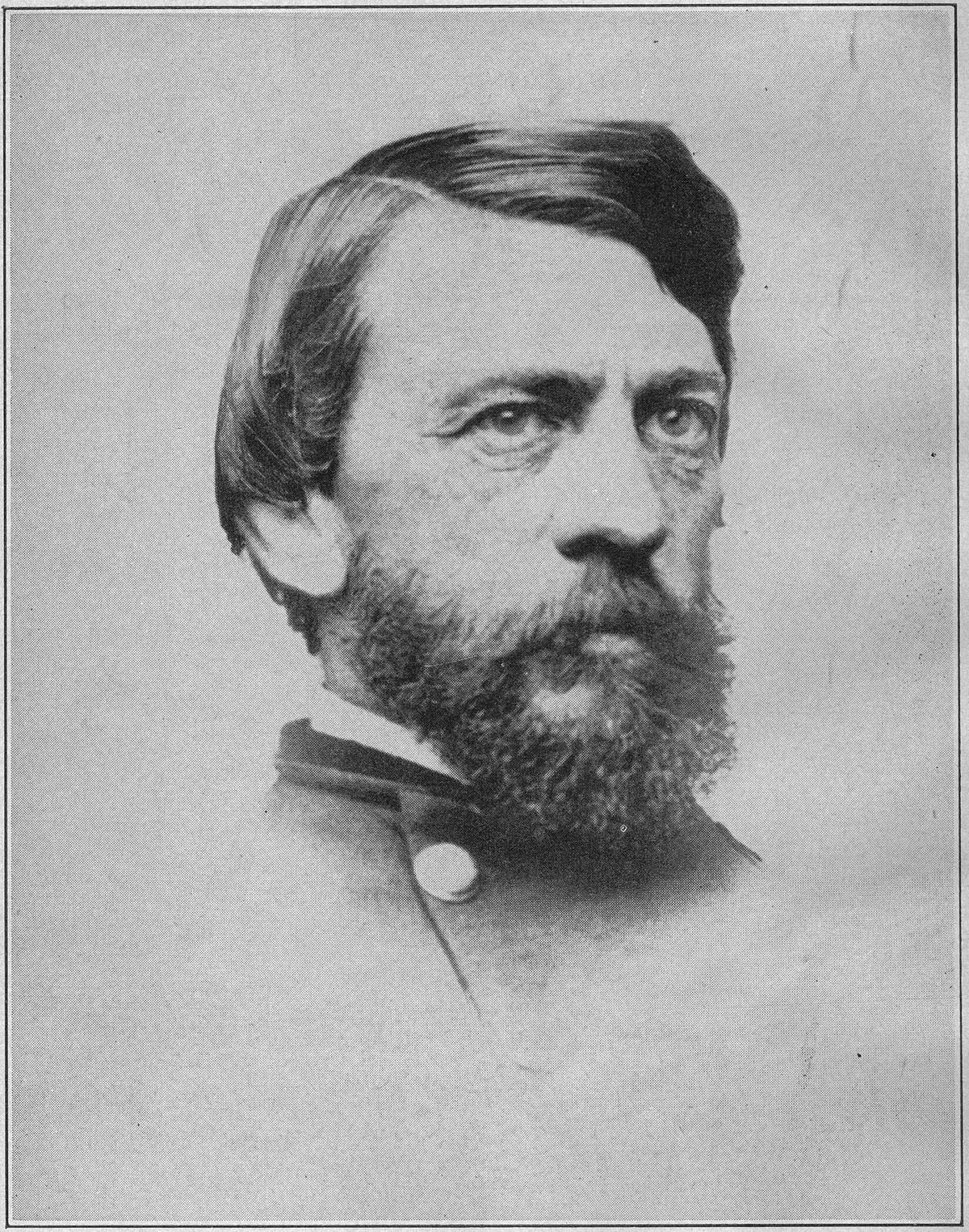
Jonathan Letterman

When Letterman became medical director of the Army of the Potomac, he worked to create an integrated medical capability based on a coordinated system of casualty evacuation to divisional field hospitals and the organization of medical logistics, including medicine supply tables. On August 2, 1862, under the instruction of Jonathan Letterman, General George B. McClellan issued General Orders 147 and created the United States Army's first full-time, dedicated Ambulance Corps. These orders determined the structure, training and role of the service; and were a blueprint for the creation of subsequent Ambulance Corps later in the war.

His plan placed all ambulances for each army corps under the control of its medical director. Captains commanded the corps-level ambulance organization, first lieutenants commanded at the division level, second lieutenants led at the brigade level, and sergeants at the regimental level. Letterman's use of non-physician officers to command ambulance units represented a significant shift in Army Medical Department policy, as it allowed physicians to focus on patient care.

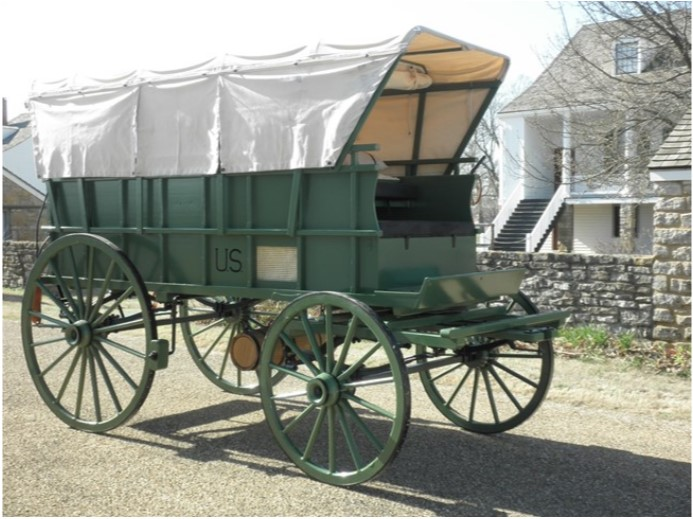
Recreation of a Civil War Ambulance at Fort Scott

Each infantry regiment was assigned a pair of two-horse ambulances, a four-horse ambulance, and a medical supply wagon. Cavalry regiments were assigned two ambulances while each artillery battery was assigned one. Each ambulance could carry two stretchers and was assigned three privates, one a driver and the other two stretcher bearers trained specifically in their duty. Each supply wagon was assigned a private as a driver. Two additional supply wagons were assigned to each division, and each army corps was assigned an additional two ambulances. Only patients and medical personnel were allowed to utilize these wagons, preventing them from being commandeered for other purposes.

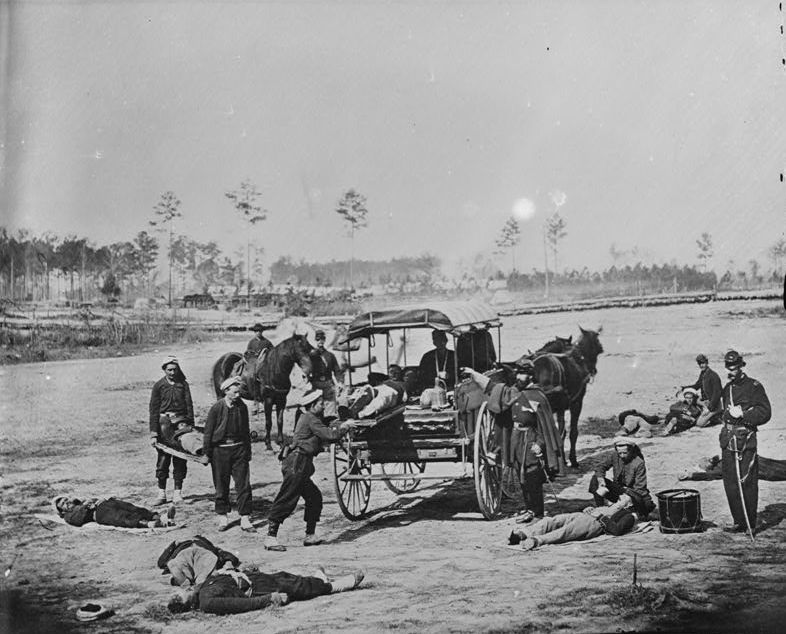
U.S. Ambulance Corps field training. Photograph by William F. Browne

The Army of the Potomac's Ambulance Corps soon demonstrated its worth in the Battle of Antietam in September 1862, although it was only partially in place. Where the corps was set up on the Union right wing, all wounded soldiers were evacuated during the night, while on the left wing, the wounded were not evacuated until the following night. Nevertheless, despite its success, the service received hostility from the military.

Full implementation of Letterman's plan occurred three months later at Fredericksburg. With nearly 1,000 ambulances available, all Union casualties (with the exception of about twenty soldiers who were within Confederate lines) were evacuated during the night of 13 December. Surgeon General Hammond, visiting the Army of the Potomac, expressed his approval of the results. General McClellan also gave his approval of the service, noting how it decreased the number of combat soldiers pulled from the battlefield. The Army of the Potomac continued to benefit from its unified medical support capability in the Battle of Gettysburg, where not one wounded soldier was left on the battlefield within Union lines by early morning the day after the battle. By the summer of 1864 the Army of the Potomac's ambulance corps numbered 800 ambulances with 66 officers and 2,600 enlisted soldiers.

Surgeon General Hammon recommended that other Union Army units also adopt Letterman's innovations, although many continued to experience difficulty in battlefield evacuation. Surgeon Thomas A. McParlin, medical director of the Federal Army of Virginia, submitted Letterman's plan to his commander, Brigadier General John Pope, but there was not enough time to implement it before Second Manassas. Surgeon Glover Perin, upon becoming medical director of the Army of the Cumberland in February 1863, found an inefficient ambulance service. He attributed this to the absence of commissioned ambulance corps officers, the lack of attendants, and the control of ambulances by the Quartermaster Department. He adopted a modified Letterman plan, but even with that in place the Army of the Cumberland left behind an estimated 2,500 of its wounded at Chickamauga in September 1863.

The success of Letterman's corps, combined with petitions and lobbying by Hammond and others, put pressure on Congress to create a permanent ambulance corps. They did so on 11 March 1864, passing a law that authorized corps commanders to form ambulance organizations and provided for the examination of candidates to staff it by boards of medical officers. This was officially implemented by the War Department's General Orders No. 106, issued on 16 March 1864, which also gave commanders the authority to create a distinctive uniform for members of the Ambulance Corps.

Following the Civil War the Army Medical Department, like the rest of the Army, declined in numbers. The special laws that had been passed for the prosecution of the Civil War expired when the war ended including, in 1866, the law that created the Ambulance Corps. Along with the wartime structure of the Ambulance Corps, the general hospitals, hospital ships and trains disappeared. The Medical Department forfeited the progress it had made toward establishing commissioned officers in medical administrative specialties.

== Ambulances ==
In the first year of the Civil War, the US Army had relatively few dedicated ambulances and often used standard wagons repurposed as ambulances. Of the ambulance wagons it did have, most were the two-wheeled variety pulled by one or two horses. These could carry two or three patients at most, broke down often, and were referred to as "avalanches" or "gutbusters" due to the poor quality of riding in them.

By the second year of the war, four-wheeled ambulances had largely replaced the two-wheeled vehicles. There were many variations, but they generally included spring suspension and came in two types: a light two-horse wagon and a heavier four-horse wagon. The largest types could carry four to six on stretchers and several more seated. Although an improvement over previous vehicles, they were still not comfortable to ride in, with the ultimate goal of getting the patient to another form of transport or hospital by the shortest distance possible.

The purpose of a medicine wagon was to carry three month's worth of medical and surgical supplies for a regiment. These were carried in special drawers and shelving to keep them organized and prevent shifting during transit. A variety of designs were prototyped and adopted during the war, but the Autenrieth model seems to have become the standard, with the Perot also fairly common. Both were fairly boxy, conventional designs. Early models of the Autenrieth tended to be top-heavy and lacked breaking mechanisms, but these were eventually rectified.

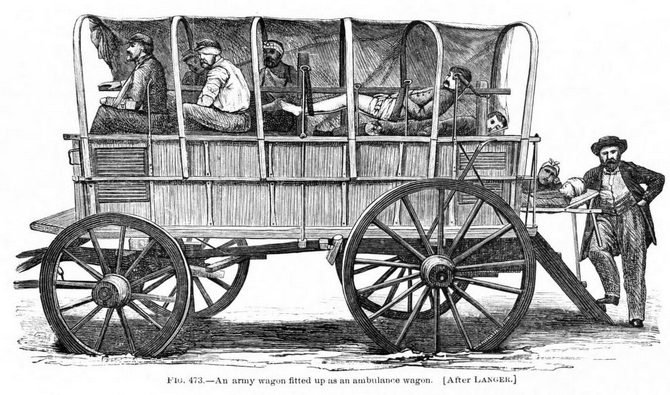
US Army wagon fitted as an ambulance

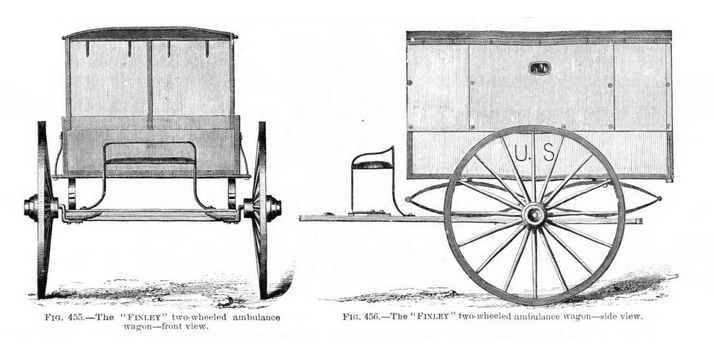
The "Finley" ambulance wagon

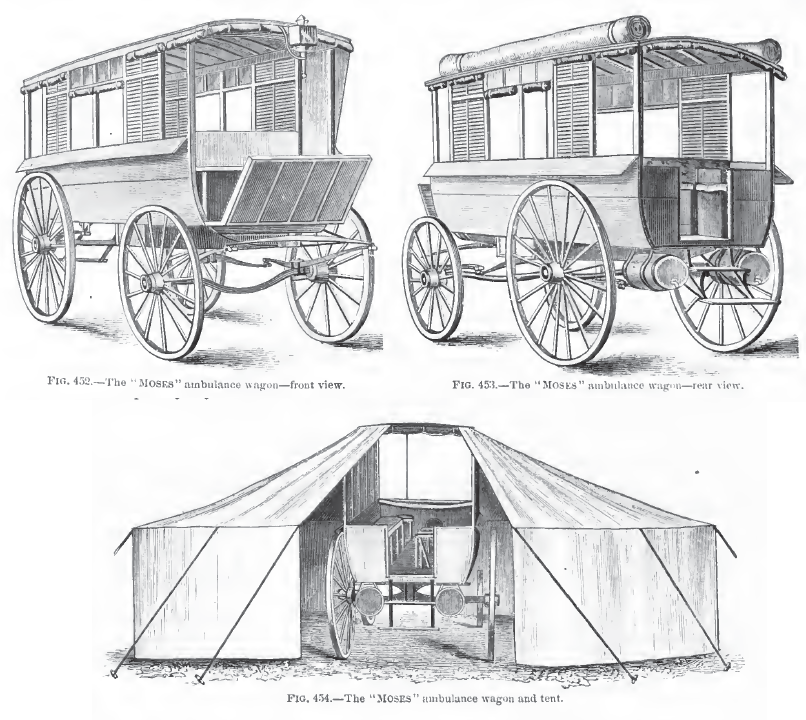
The "Moses" ambulance wagon

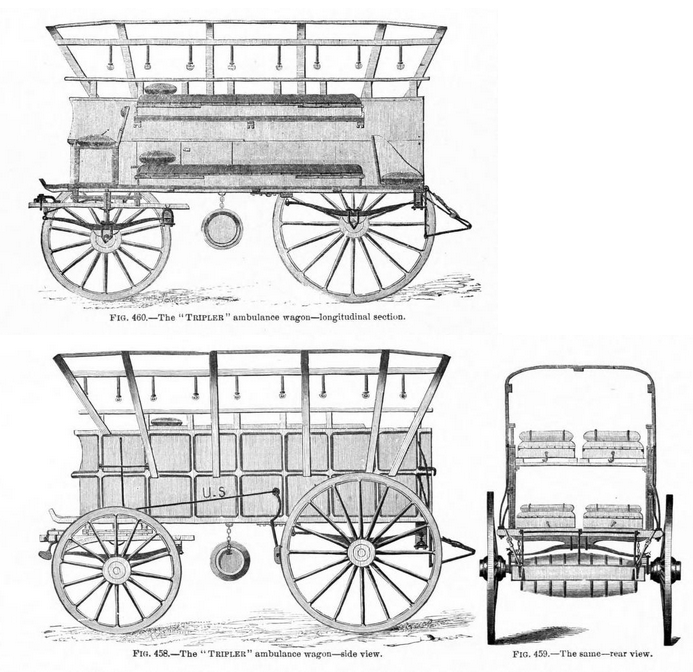
The "Tripler" ambulance wagon

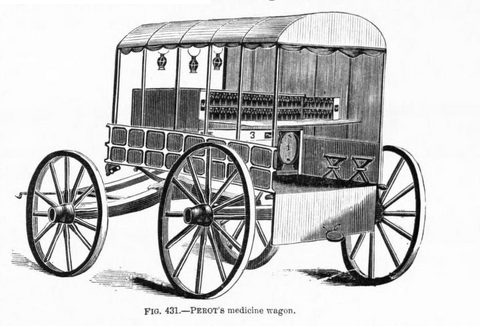
Perot medicine wagon

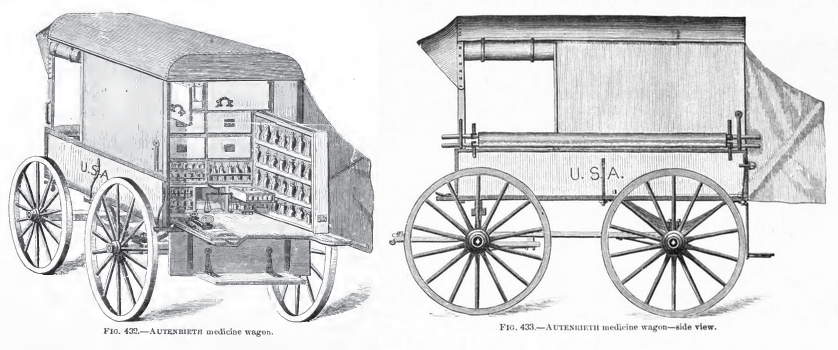
Autenrieth medicine wagon

== Bibliography ==
- Brooks, Stewart (1966). Civil War Medicine. Charles C. Thomas Publisher.
- Brinton, John (1914). Personal Memoirs of John H. Brinton, Major and Surgeon, U.S.V. 1861–1865. New York: Neale.
- Clements, Bennett Augustine (1883). Memoir of Jonathan Letterman. Palala Press.
- Chisholm, Julian (1861). A Manual of Military Surgery for the Use of Surgeons in the Confederate Army.
- Ginn, Richard (1997). The History of the U.S. Army Medical Service Corps. United States Army.
- Letterman, Jonathan (1866). Medical Recollections of the Army of the Potomac.
- Livermore, Thomas L. (1901). Number and losses in the civil war in America 1861–65. Mifflin and Co.
- Medical and Surgical History of the War of the Rebellion Part 1 Volume 1. 1870.
- Medical and Surgical History of the War of the Rebellion Part 3 Volume 2. 1883.
- Sears, Stephen W. (1983). Landscape Turned Red. New York: Ticknor and Fields.
- Schroeder-Lein, G. R. (2008). The Encyclopedia of Civil War Medicine. United States: M. E. Sharpe Incorporated.
- Shrader, C. R., Newell, C. R. (2011). Of Duty Well and Faithfully Done: A History of the Regular Army in the Civil War. United States: Nebraska.

== See also ==
- United States Sanitary Commission

== Sources ==
- Wagner, Margaret. The American Civil War: 365 Days. Abrams, New York, in association with the Library of Congress.
- Purcell, Peter N.; Hummel, Robert P. (1992). "Samuel Preston Moore: Surgeon-general of the confederacy". The American Journal of Surgery. 164 (4): 361–5. doi:10.1016/S0002-9610(05)80905-5. PMID 1415944.
