= Ada White Bacot =

Confederate nurse (1832–1911)

- Born: December 31, 1832; Darlington District, SC
- Died: April 11, 1911
- Resting place: Roseville Plantation, SC
- Occupation: Confederate nurse
- Years active: 1861-1863
- Spouse: Thomas Wainwright Bacot Jr. Thomas Clarke (married 1863-1863) James Clarke (married 1876)
- Children: 8

Ada White Bacot (December 31, 1832 – April 11, 1911) was a Confederate nurse for Civil War soldiers from 1861–1863. She worked as a Civil War nurse at Monticello Hospital and eventually Midway Hospital in Charlottesville, VA. In 1863, Bacot left the nursing profession for unknown reasons.

== Personal life ==
Ada White Bacot was born on December 31, 1832 in Darlington District, South Carolina. She was the oldest of six siblings and attended St. Mary's Academy in Raleigh, North Carolina. Her father, Peter Samuel Bacot, was a wealthy plantation owner and owned Roseville Plantation. Bacot was also a plantation owner and owned Arnmore Plantation, which she inherited from her late husband Thomas Wainwright Bacot Jr. Wainwright Bacot was killed in 1856. By 1860, Ada White Bacot was a widow and both of her daughters, Anna Jane and Emily Helen, had died. Bacot adopted a foster child named Flora, but struggled to look after Flora and dreaded teaching her. Bacot was Episcopalian and believed strongly in her religion.

== Career ==
Ada White Bacot became a volunteer nurse in the Civil War out of patriotism for South Carolina and as an act against Southern patriarchy. Bacot began work at Monticello Hospital in Charlottesville, VA, in December 1861. Monticello was one of the hospitals sponsored by the South Carolina Hospital Aid Association. The Association used raised and donated funds, along with money from South Carolina governor Francis Pickens to maintain multiple hospitals for Confederate soldiers. Bacot began work as a housekeeper and worked hard to keep the previously filthy hospital in good condition. Eventually, Bacot took over the job of preparing food and doing laundry for wounded soldiers from Esse Habersham. Women were rarely allowed to look after patients, and almost all the female nurses performed housekeeper jobs rather than having medical duties.

Bacot saw that many of the soldiers were lonely and frequently wrote letters for soldiers and read the Bible to them. Helping the soldiers made her feel as though she could help ease their sorrow and pain. Much of Bacot's diary focuses on her interactions with coworkers and patients rather than her actual duties in the hospital, emphasizing her relationships over her work. In Bacot's diary entries she shared largely about her time in the Maupin House where she lived with other nurses and doctors. Bacot's practice as a nurse was largely driven by her religion and she believed it was her God granted right to serve the country.

A few of her closest companions were Esse Habersham, Dr. James McIntosh, and Dr. Edward Rembert. Bacot later began work at Midway hospital, another Virginia hospital sponsored by the South Carolina Hospital Aid Association. She left for Midway upon request from Dr. Rembert, but struggled with the decision because Dr. McIntosh did not want her to leave Monticello. For unknown reasons, Ada White Bacot left the nursing profession in late 1863.

Ada White Bacot is also commonly known to have signed an oath of allegiance to the United States, which was a strategic move (legally) used to maintain/protect her assets inherited from her father.

== Legacy ==
During her duties, Ada White Bacot met her second husband, Thomas Clarke. Clarke, however, died just two months after they married in 1863. Bacot and Clarke had a son, Thomas Alfred Chives Clarke, who was born in 1864. Bacot later married James Clarke, Thomas' brother, and they had four children together.

Ada White Bacot's work as a Civil War nurse left a lasting impact on her personal feelings of independence. Her relationships with both patients and other hospital employees helped her to find a sense of satisfaction. Bacot learned many lessons about herself and the work gave her confidence. Ada White Bacot died on April 11, 1911 and is buried at Roseville Plantation.
