= Roseville Plantation (Florence, South Carolina) =

Historic house in South Carolina, United States

- U.S. National Register of Historic Places
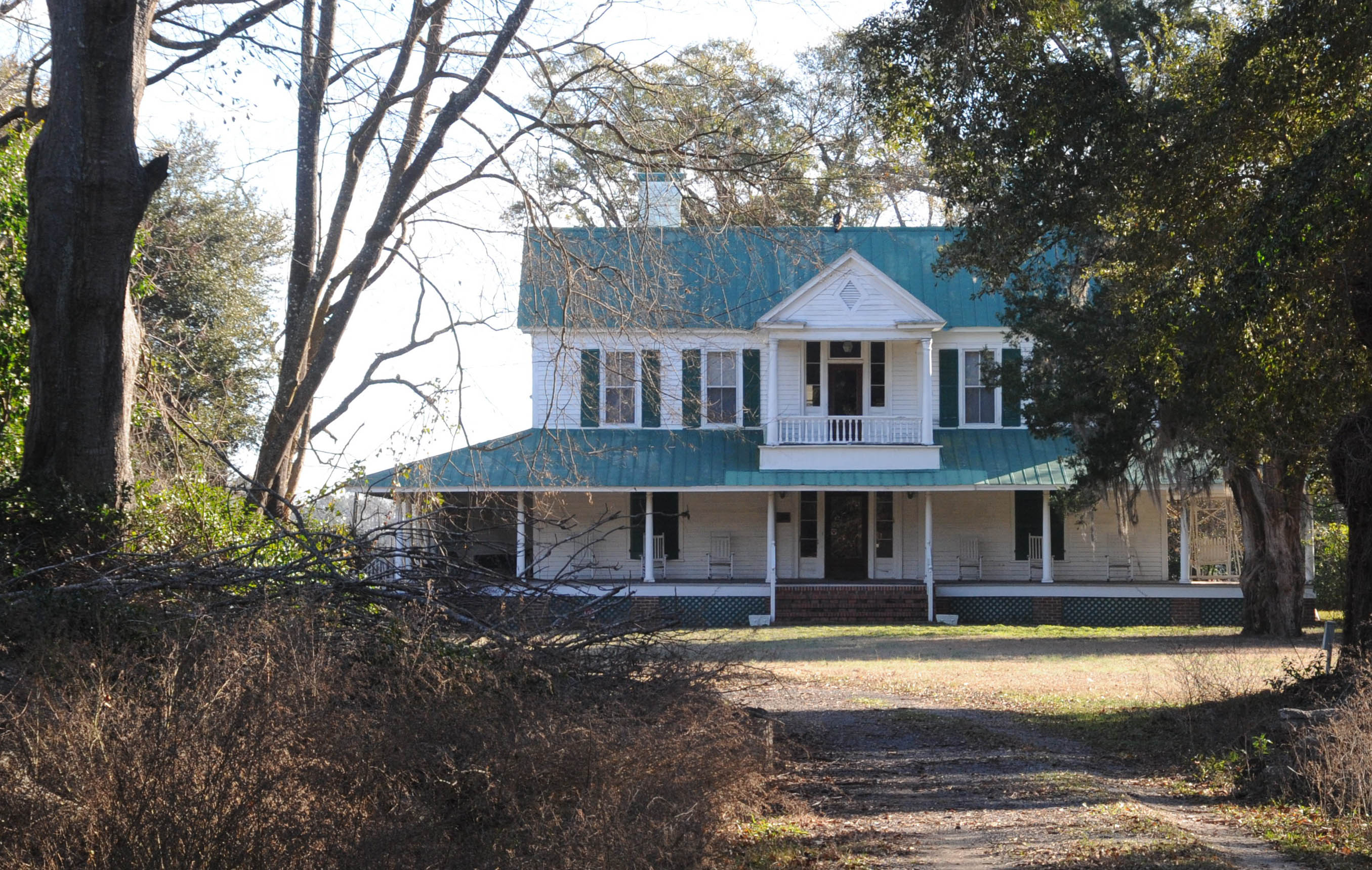

- Location within South Carolina Location within the United States
- Location: 3636 Williston Rd., near Florence, South Carolina
- Coordinates: 34°16′37″N 79°42′04″W
- Area: 13.5 acres (5.5 ha)
- Built: 1771
- Architectural style: Late 19th And 20th Century Revivals, Mid 19th Century Revival
- NRHP reference No.: 97001158
- Added to NRHP: September 25, 1997

Roseville Plantation is a historic home located near Florence, Florence County, South Carolina. It was built in 1771 and renovated about 1835 and 1910. It is a two-story, lateral gabled, weatherboard-clad residence. The building consists partly of mortise and tenoned hand-hewn and peeled log construction. The house at Roseville Plantation is at the end of a tree lined dirt driveway and set at the center of a broad sparsely landscaped lawn, resting upon a brick pier foundation which has recently been enclosed at its perimeter with stuccoed concrete block. It features a broad, one-story, hip roofed wraparound veranda.

It was listed on the National Register of Historic Places in 1997. The plantation is the final resting place of Ada White Bacot.
