= Charles Stuart Tripler =

United States Army general

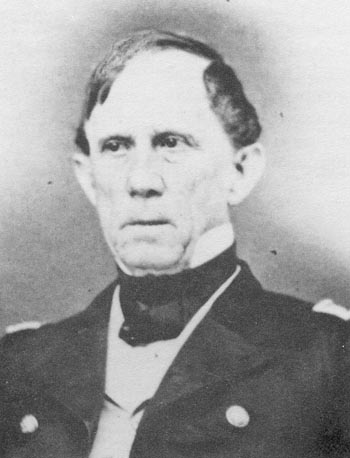
- Brig. Gen. Tripler
- Born: Charles Stuart Tripler; January 19, 1806; New York City, New York, U.S.
- Died: October 20, 1866 (aged 60); Cincinnati, Ohio, U.S.
- Burial place: Elmwood Cemetery, Detroit
- Military career
- Allegiance: United States of America
- Branch: United States Army
- Service years: 1830–1866
- Rank: Brevet Brigadier General; Brigadier General (posthumously)
- Unit: Army Medical Department
- Commands: Chief Surgeon, Department of the Lakes; Medical Director, Army of the Potomac; Medical Director, Twiggs' Division
- Conflicts: Second Seminole War; Mexican–American War: Mexico City Campaign; American Civil War: Peninsula Campaign

Charles Stuart Tripler (January 19, 1806 – October 20, 1866) was a United States Army brigadier general and surgeon. On March 8, 1867, he was posthumously promoted to brigadier general by President Andrew Johnson and the date of rank was backdated to March 13, 1865. The Tripler Army Medical Center in Oahu, Hawaii, is named in his honor.

== Early life ==
Tripler studied under an apothecary, Dr. Stephen Brown, in his early years before attending the College of Physicians and Surgeons. After graduating in 1827, he served as a resident at Bellevue Hospital before deciding to go to West Point as assistant to post surgeon Walter V, Wheaton. There, he was allowed to take classes in mathematics and languages, and was commissioned as an army assistant surgeon in 1830.

== Military career ==
Tripler was regularly transferred over the whole country before he served in the Second Seminole War and the Mexican–American War. During the Mexico City Campaign he was assigned as medical director of General David E. Twiggs regular division and was afterwards ordered to organize and command the army's general hospital in the city. After the war he continued his service in New York, Michigan, Kentucky and California. In 1852 Tripler was part of an expedition tasked with traveling down the east coast from New York to Panama where they would march across the country to the west coast and sail back. During the march through Panama, the unit's soldiers began to have an outbreak of cholera, malaria, diarrhea, and dysentery which enlightened Tripler to the inadequate medical procedures in place by the Army. After the eruption of the Civil War Tripler was ordered to Washington, and on August 12, 1861, he was appointed medical director of the Army of the Potomac. Participating in the Peninsula Campaign of 1862 he was, under pressure from the United States Sanitary Commission, replaced by Jonathan Letterman. He was allowed to choose his next appointment, and accordingly became Chief Surgeon of the Department of the Lakes, and was stationed in Detroit. While there he helped convince the War Department to establish a military hospital leading to the founding of Harper Hospital, now part of the Detroit Medical Center. Tripler remained in this position for the duration of the war, and was appointed Brevet Brigadier General on March 13, 1865. Diagnosed with a malignant tumor of the glands of the neck in early 1866 he died on October 20, 1866.

== After death ==
Tripler was buried at Elmwood Cemetery in Detroit. His wife, Eunice Hunt Tripler, became a vocal advocate for her husband's legacy. Friends of the family petitioned President Andrew Johnson for recognition of Tripler's contributions to the medical community and on March 8, 1867, he was posthumously promoted to brigadier general. In 1920, the hospital at Fort Shafter was renamed to Tripler Army Medical Center.

Tripler's military career was not considered remarkable while he was still living. In 1858, he wrote the Manual of the Medical Officer of the Army of the United States which outlined basic physical requirements for army recruits and was immediately accepted by the Army almost as a policy. In 1861, he wrote Handbook for the Military Surgeon, which standardized many of the Army's medical practices to include administration, hygiene, and surgery. He is also credited with inventing the first army four-wheeled medical ambulance.
