= The Day Lincoln Was Shot =

1998 TV film

- DVD cover
- Genre: Biographical; Period drama
- Based on: The Day Lincoln Was Shot by Jim Bishop
- Written by: John Gray; Tim Metcalfe
- Directed by: John Gray
- Starring: Lance Henriksen; Rob Morrow
- Music by: Mark Snow
- Country of origin: United States
- Original language: English

Production
- Executive producer: Robert Greenwald
- Producer: Thomas John Kane
- Production locations: Virginia Rep Center - 114 W. Broad Street, Richmond, Virginia; New York City; Petersburg, Virginia; Washington, D.C.
- Cinematography: Ronald Victor Garcia
- Editor: Scott Vickrey
- Running time: 96 minutes
- Production company: TNT

Original release
- Network: TNT
- Release: April 12, 1998

The Day Lincoln Was Shot is a 1998 American television film, based on the book by Jim Bishop, co-written and directed by John Gray. It stars Lance Henriksen as Abraham Lincoln and Rob Morrow as John Wilkes Booth. The film is a re-creation of the assassination of Abraham Lincoln, and shows the events leading up to and after the assassination, as well as a look into the personal lives of both men.

Bishop's book had previously been adapted in 1956 as a live television play directed by Delbert Mann and starring Raymond Massey as Lincoln, Lillian Gish as Mary, and Jack Lemmon as John Wilkes Booth. It was telecast on the CBS anthology series Ford Star Jubilee.

The film premiered on TNT on April 12, 1998.

== Plot ==
Relieved that Richmond has fallen and the American Civil War is over, Abraham Lincoln has contentious discussions with his Cabinet about the treatment of the defeated Confederacy. Many members of his cabinet want the Confederates punished, but Lincoln argues for mercy. He is despised by many Confederates and receives numerous death threats. Lincoln had a disturbing dream about his death.

Coming from an acting family, John Wilkes Booth feels overshadowed by his father and brother and sees Lincoln as a tyrant and slavery as a proper way of life. He assembles a plot to kidnap Lincoln with motley group of Confederates, including former Soldier Lewis Powell and simple-minded David Herold. On April 11, Booth is outraged when he hears Lincoln making a speech promising African-Americans citizenship and the vote. His changes his plot from kidnapping to murder.

On April 14, Booth decided to assassinate Lincoln at Ford's Theatre, orders Powell to kill Secretary of State William Seward, and orders another henchman, George Adzerodt, to kill Vice President Andrew Johnson. Later that night, Powell attacks Seward, his two sons, and two officials in an unsuccessful assassination attempt. Atzerodt got too drunk to even attack Johnson at the Kirkwood Hotel. Meanwhile, during the performance of Our American Cousin at Ford's Theater, Booth shoots Lincoln and stabs one of Lincoln's guests, Major Henry Rathbone, before escaping into Maryland. After being attended by Dr. Charles Leale, Lincoln was carried across the street to the Petersen House, where he died at 7:22 A.M. surrounded by his friends and family for the remaining 8 hours. After an intense manhunt for two weeks, Boston Corbett fatally shoots Booth inside a burning barn surrounded by federal troops, while Herold got apprehended.

The credits reveal that seven of Booth's henchmen and Mary Surratt were put on trial and that four of them were hanged in July 1865. Lincoln's successor Johnson was much harsher on the defeated South than Lincoln would have been.

== Cast ==
- Lance Henriksen as Abraham Lincoln
- Rob Morrow as John Wilkes Booth
- Donna Murphy as Mary Lincoln
- Jean Louisa Kelly as Lucy Hale
- Wil Wheaton as Robert Lincoln
- Titus Welliver as Lewis Powell
- Jaimz Woolvett as David Herold
- Kirk B. R. Woller as George Atzerodt
- Eddie Jones as Edwin M. Stanton
- Jeremy Sisto as Frederick W. Seward
- John Pleshette as William H. Seward
- Gregory Itzin as William Crook
- Adam Lamberg as Tad Lincoln
- John Ashton as Ulysses S. Grant
- Nancy Robinette as Mary Surratt

== Home releases ==
The film is now available on DVD via the burn-on-demand Warner Archive service.
