= Tad Lincoln =

Fourth son of President Abraham Lincoln (1853–1871)

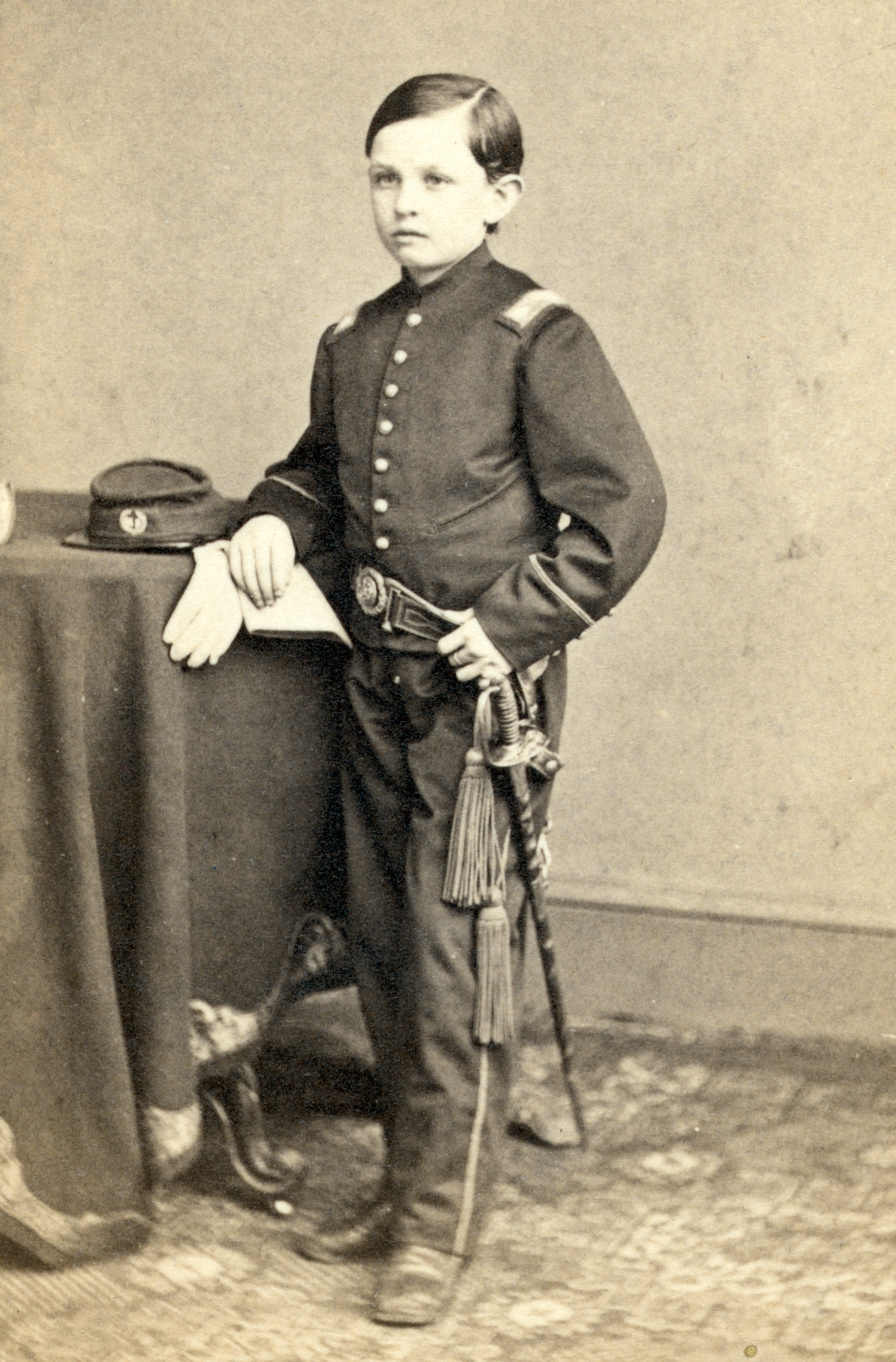
- Lincoln wearing an army uniform, c. 1864
- Born: Thomas Lincoln; April 4, 1853; Springfield, Illinois, U.S.
- Died: July 15, 1871 (aged 18); Chicago, Illinois, U.S.
- Resting place: Lincoln Tomb at Oak Ridge Cemetery
- Education: Elizabeth Street School, Chicago
- Parents: Abraham Lincoln (father); Mary Todd Lincoln (mother)
- Relatives: Edward Baker Lincoln (brother); Robert Todd Lincoln (brother); William Wallace Lincoln (brother)
- Family: Lincoln family

Thomas "Tad" Lincoln (April 4, 1853 – July 15, 1871) was the fourth and youngest son of the 16th president of the United States Abraham Lincoln and his wife Mary Todd Lincoln. After his father's assassination in 1865, he lived with his mother in Chicago and they made an extended visit to Germany and the United Kingdom. He died suddenly of natural causes at age 18 in Chicago.

== Early life and education ==
Thomas Lincoln was born in Springfield, Illinois, on April 4, 1853, the fourth son of Abraham Lincoln and Mary Todd. His three elder brothers were Robert (1843–1926), Edward (1846–1850), and William (1850–1862). Named after his paternal grandfather Thomas Lincoln, he was soon nicknamed "Tad" by his father, for his small body and large head, and because as an infant he wiggled like a tadpole. Tad's first name has occasionally been erroneously recorded as Thaddeus.

Tad was born with a form of cleft lip and palate, which caused him speech problems throughout his life. He had a lisp and delivered his words rapidly and unintelligibly. Often only those close to Lincoln were able to understand him. For example, he called his father's bodyguard, William H. Crook, "Took," and his father "Papa Day" instead of "Papa Dear." The cleft palate contributed to uneven teeth; he had such difficulty chewing food that his meals were specially prepared.

Lincoln and his brother Willie were considered "notorious hellions" during the period they lived in Springfield. William Herndon, Abraham Lincoln's law partner, wrote about the times Lincoln would bring the boys to work with him in Illinois: "The boys were absolutely unrestrained in their amusement. If they pulled down all the books from the shelves, bent the points of all the pens, overturned inkstands, scattered law papers over the floor or threw the pencils into the spittoon, it never disturbed the serenity of their father's good nature."

== White House years ==
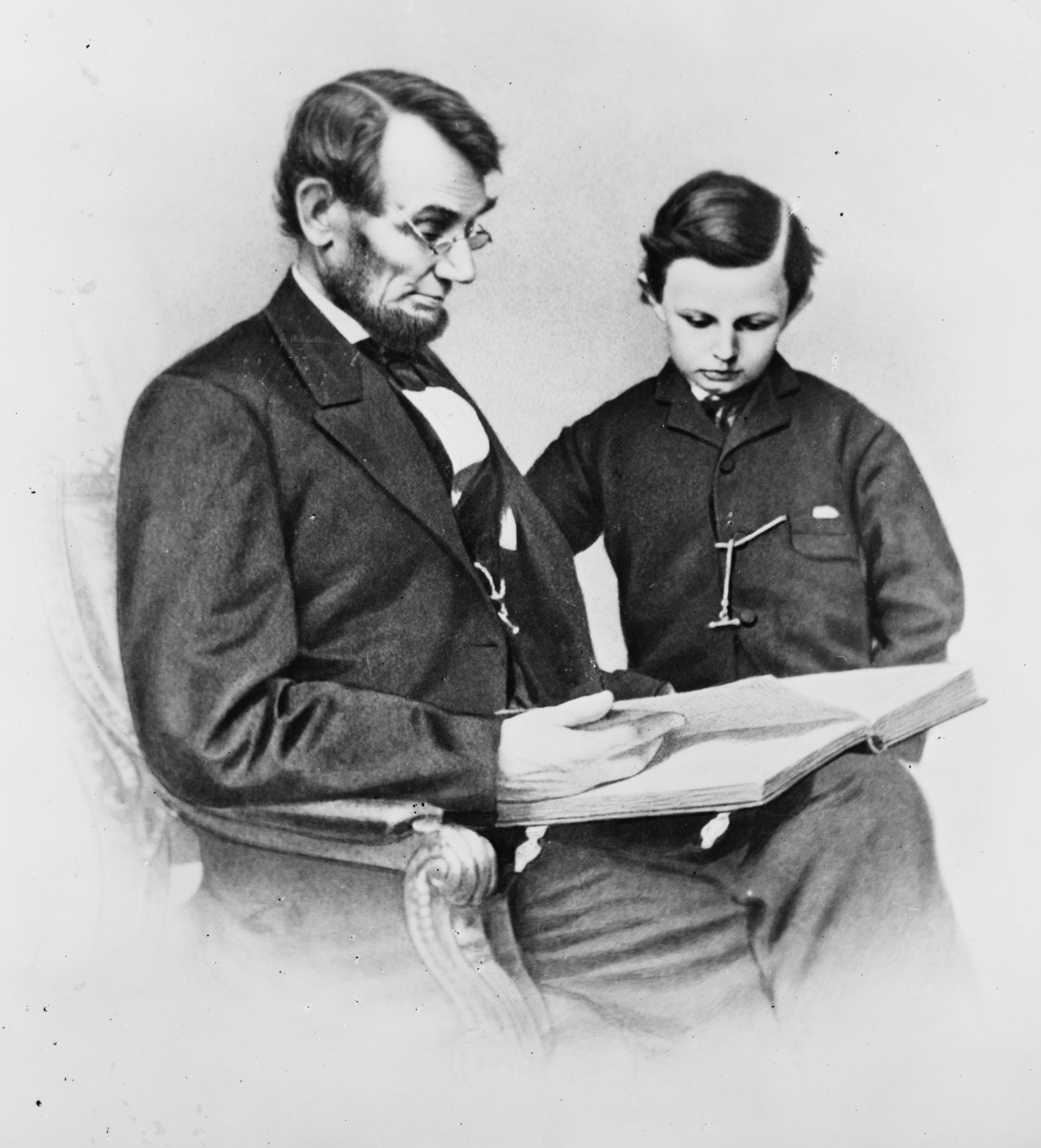
Tad Lincoln with his father looking at a photo album

Upon their father's election as President, both Tad and Willie moved into the White House and it became their new playground and home. At the request of Mrs. Lincoln, Julia Taft brought her younger brothers, 14-year-old "Bud" (Horatio Nelson Taft Jr., 1847–1915) and 12-year-old "Holly" (Halsey Cook Taft, 1849–1897), to the White House, and they became playmates of the two young Lincolns.

In February 1862, both Lincoln boys contracted typhoid fever and were bedridden. Willie died on February 20, while Tad recovered. However he cried frequently for a month, not only for his brother's death, but for the loss of his other two playmates Bud and Holly, for his mother sent them away after Willie's death, because they reminded her too much of him. After Willie's death, Tad's parents became even more lenient toward Tad's behavior, and Tad spent nearly all his time with his father.

During the time his father was alive, Tad was impulsive and unrestrained, and did not attend school. John Hay wrote that the boy's numerous tutors in the White House usually quit in frustration. Tad had free run of the White House, and there are stories of him interrupting presidential meetings, collecting animals, charging visitors to see his father, and more.

A likely apocryphal story states that Abraham pardoned Tad's Christmas turkey in 1863, which according to the myth, served as the inspiration for modern turkey pardons for Thanksgiving (a holiday that was nationalized that year under Abraham's presidency). The story was not published until after Abraham's death, and its context suggests that it was a fable not unlike George Washington and the cherry tree. The tradition of Thanksgiving turkey presentations did not begin until 1947, and the pardon portion was not added until 1989, with George H. W. Bush remarking that the pardon reference originated at the whim of his speechwriter.

During the Civil War, Tad was commissioned as a lieutenant in the Union Army by Secretary of War Edwin Stanton. In this position Tad drilled the White House servants in the use of firearms.

On April 14, 1865, Tad went to Grover's Theatre to see the play Aladdin and the Wonderful Lamp while his parents attended the performance of Tom Taylor's play Our American Cousin at Ford's Theatre. That night, his father was assassinated by Confederate sympathizer John Wilkes Booth. When news of the assassination spread to Grover's Theatre, the manager made an announcement to the entire audience. Tad began running and screaming: "They killed Papa! They killed Papa!" Tad was escorted back to the White House, while his mother pleaded to have him brought to his father's deathbed at the Petersen House. "Bring Tad—he will speak to Tad—he loves him so." Late that night, an inconsolable Tad was put to bed by a White House doorman. President Lincoln died the next morning, on Saturday, April 15, at 7:22 am. About the death of his father, Tad said:

Pa is dead. I can hardly believe that I shall never see him again. I must learn to take care of myself now. Yes, Pa is dead, and I am only Tad Lincoln now, little Tad, like other little boys. I am not a president's son now. I won't have many presents anymore. Well, I will try and be a good boy, and will hope to go someday to Pa and brother Willie, in Heaven.

== Later life ==
After the assassination, Mary, Robert, and Tad Lincoln lived together in Chicago. Robert moved out after a short time, and Tad began attending school. In 1868, Mary and Tad left Chicago and lived in Europe for almost three years, in Germany and later in England.

Lincoln suffered from what one modern commentator has called a "complex speech and language disorder" related to some form of a cleft lip or palate. This caused some problems when Lincoln was in school in Chicago. While at the Elizabeth Street School in that city, his schoolmates sometimes called him "Stuttering Tad" because of the speech impediment, which he was able to learn how to manage as a teenager.

== Death ==
On Saturday morning, July 15, 1871, Lincoln died at the age of 18 at the Clifton House hotel in Chicago. The cause of death has been variously referred to as tuberculosis, a pleuristic attack, pneumonia, or congestive heart failure. (Note: Emerson, Jason (2012). Giant in the Shadows:The Life of Robert T. Lincoln. SIU (Southern Illinois University) Press. p. 478. ISBN 978-0-8093-9071-7. "With serious effusion compressing the lungs and crowding the nearby heart, there was not enough oxygen to maintain the life centers of the brain" (quoting Milton Shutes, "Mortality of the Five Lincoln Boys", Lincoln Herald, vol. 57 (Spring 1955), p. 7.)) In an obituary, John Hay affectionately referred to him as "Little Tad."

Funeral services were held for Lincoln in his brother Robert's home in Chicago. His body was transported to Springfield and buried in the Lincoln Tomb at Oak Ridge Cemetery, alongside his father and two of his brothers. Robert accompanied the casket on the train, but Mary was too distraught to make the trip.

== Screen portrayals ==
On film and television Tad Lincoln has been portrayed by,
- Newton Hall in The Dramatic Life of Abraham Lincoln (1924)
- Gordon Thorpe in Abraham Lincoln (1930)
- Dickie Moore in Lincoln in the White House (1939, Short)
- Henry Blair in Abe Lincoln in Illinois (1940)
- John Levin in Lincoln (1974)
- Robby Benson in The Last of Mrs. Lincoln (1976)
- Troy Sweeney in Lincoln (1988)
- Andrew Winton in The Perfect Tribute (1991)
- Bug Hall in Tad (1995)
- Adam Lamberg in The Day Lincoln Was Shot (1998)
- Gulliver McGrath in Lincoln (2012)
- Joshua Rush in Saving Lincoln (2013)
- Benjamin Perkinson in Killing Lincoln (2013)

== See also ==
- Lincoln family tree

== Sources ==
- Bayne, Julia Taft; DeCredico, Mary A (2001). Tad Lincoln's Father (First Bison Books ed.). Lincoln: University of Nebraska Press. ISBN 0-8032-6191-8. OCLC 248170310.
- Hutchinson, John M. (Winter 2009). "What Was Tad Lincoln's Speech Problem?". Journal of the Abraham Lincoln Association. 30 (1). University of Illinois Press.
- Randall, Ruth Painter (1955). Lincoln's Sons. Boston: Little, Brown. OCLC 9448054.
- Wead, Doug (2003). All The Presidents' Children. New York: Atria Books. ISBN 0-7434-4631-3. OCLC 51616758.
