= Albert F. A. King =

English-born American physician

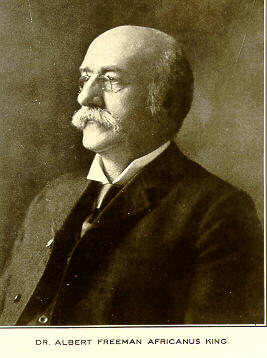
- Portrait of Dr. Albert F. A. King
- Born: Albert Freeman Africanus King; 18 January 1841; Ambrosden, Oxfordshire, England
- Died: 13 December 1914 (aged 73); Washington, D.C., US
- Resting place: Rock Creek Cemetery; Washington, D.C., U.S. 38.56°N 77.0°W
- Citizenship: UK; USA
- Education: National Medical College of Columbian University (1st MD); University of Pennsylvania (2nd MD); George Washington University
- Known for: Service in assassination of Abraham Lincoln; Mosquito-malaria theory
- Spouse: Ellen Amory Dexter
- Children: 2
- Scientific career
- Fields: Obstetrics; Philosophy of medicine
- Workplaces: Lincoln Hospital; National Medical College of Columbian University; University of Vermont College of Medicine; Providence Hospital (Washington, D.C.); Georgetown University
- Thesis: Basis of an Improved Medical Philosophy (1865)

Albert Freeman Africanus King (18 January 1841 – 13 December 1914) was an English-born American physician who was pressed into service at the assassination of Abraham Lincoln on 14 April 1865. He was one of a few physicians who served in both the Confederate States Army and the United States Army during the American Civil War. In addition, King was one of the earliest to suggest the connection between mosquitos and malaria.

== Early life ==
On 18 January 1841, King was born in Ambrosden, a village near Bicester in the Cherwell District of north-eastern Oxfordshire in England. He was the youngest of three children of Edward King and Louisa Freeman. His sister was Stella Louisa Elizabeth King (born 1838) and brother was Claudius Edward Richard King (born 1839). His father was a doctor interested in the colonization of Africa. He was named Africanus "because of his father's admiration" for that continent. He attended Maley's School and the Bicester Diocesan School.

His family left Liverpool on 26 August 1854 to emigrate to the United States. They arrived in Jersey City, New Jersey, on 7 September 1854 (but some records indicate 1851) and first settled in Alexandria, Virginia. In 1855, they moved to Bushy Bridges, Prince William County.

== Education and early career ==
King earned his Doctor of Medicine degree from National Medical College of Columbian University (now George Washington University Medical School) in 1861 at age twenty. In November he became an Acting Assistant Surgeon to Major J. W. L. Daniel of 15th AL Infantry, Confederate States Army, and the University of Pennsylvania. In 1864 he was appointed Acting Assistant Surgeon in the U.S. Army, and worked at the Lincoln Hospital, Washington, D.C. In 1865, he became lecturer on toxicology at the National Medical College of Columbian University, and also obtained his second MD degree from the University of Pennsylvania.

=== Lincoln assassination ===
During the American Civil War, King was in Washington, D.C. On 14 April 1865 he was in the audience at Ford's Theatre when President Abraham Lincoln was shot by John Wilkes Booth. He helped carry the dying President to a house across the street. Some suggest King was the first physician to reach Lincoln but the accounts of the other physicians present, Dr. Charles Augustus Leale and Dr. Charles Sabin Taft, suggest that King was second or third.

== Later life ==
In 1871, King became a professor of obstetrics both at the University of Vermont College of Medicine and Providence Hospital in Washington, D.C. and at the University of Vermont. From 1879 to 1894 he was Dean of National Medical College, Medical Department, at National Medical College of Columbian University.

=== Mosquito-malaria theory ===
In 1882, King proposed a method to eradicate malaria from Washington, DC. His method was to encircle the city with a wire screen as high as the Washington Monument. Many people took this as a jest, partly because the link between malaria and mosquitoes had, at that time, been hypothesized by only a few physicians. It was not until 1898 that Ronald Ross proved mosquitoes were a vector for malaria (he won the Nobel Prize for the discovery just four years later). However impractical, King was on the right track for malaria control, well in advance of the rest of the medical profession.

== Honours ==
King was elected President of Medical Society of Washington, D.C. in 1883, and again in 1903. In 1883 the University of Vermont awarded him honorary master's degree. From 1885 to 1887 he was President of Washington Obstetrical and Gynecological Society. He received LLD degree from the University of Vermont in 1894. He was Fellow of British Gynecological Society, American Gynecological Society, and American Association for the Advancement of Science. He was Consulting Physician at Children's Hospital in Washington, D.C.. He was elected member of Washington Academy of Sciences, and Associate Member of the Victoria Institute, or Philosophical Society of Great Britain.

== Personal life and death ==
King married Ellen Amory Dexter of Boston on 17 October 1894. Together they had two daughters, Louisa Freeman and Sarah Vincent. His wife died in 1935.

King died in Washington, D.C. due to senile debility, and is interred at Rock Creek Cemetery.

== See also ==
- Abraham Lincoln assassination
- Anderson Ruffin Abbott
- Joseph K. Barnes
- Charles H. Crane
- Robert K. Stone
- History of malaria

== General and cited references ==
- Honigsbaum, Mark. The Fever Trail: In Search of the Cure for Malaria, Picador, 2003. ISBN 0-312-42180-X
- Kunhardt, Dorothy and Philip B. Kunhardt, Jr. Twenty Days: A Narrative in Text and Pictures of the Assassination of Abraham Lincoln and the Twenty Days and Nights That Followed. New York: Castle Books, 1965.
- McCullough, David. The Path Between the Seas. New York: Simon and Schuster, 1977.
- Roos, Charles A. Physicians to the Presidents, and Their Patients: A Biobibliography, Bulletin of the Medical Library Association. 1961.
