= Charles Taft =

Charles Taft may refer to:

- Charles Phelps Taft (1843–1929), U.S. Congressman from Ohio and brother of President William Howard Taft
- Charles Phelps Taft II (1897–1983), Mayor of Cincinnati, Ohio and son of President William Howard Taft
- Charles Sabin Taft, physician pressed into service during the assassination of Abraham Lincoln
