= William Wallace Lincoln =

Third son of U.S. President Abraham Lincoln and Mary Todd Lincoln (1850–1862)

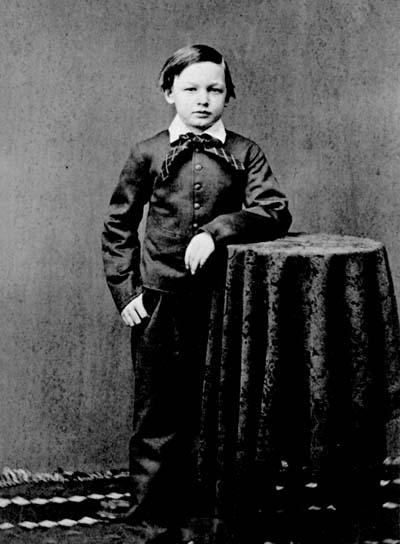
- Lincoln c. 1859–1860
- Born: December 21, 1850; Springfield, Illinois, U.S.
- Died: February 20, 1862 (aged 11); Washington, D.C., U.S.
- Cause of death: Typhoid fever
- Resting place: Lincoln Tomb, Oak Ridge Cemetery, Springfield, Illinois, U.S.
- Other name: Willie
- Parent(s): Abraham Lincoln (father); Mary Todd Lincoln (mother)
- Relatives: Edward Baker Lincoln (brother); Robert Todd Lincoln (brother); Tad Lincoln (brother)
- Family: Lincoln family

William Wallace "Willie" Lincoln (December 21, 1850 – February 20, 1862) was the third son of U.S. president Abraham Lincoln and First Lady Mary Todd Lincoln. Willie was named after Mary's brother-in-law, Dr. William Smith Wallace. He died of typhoid fever at the White House, during his father's presidency, aged 11.

== Life ==
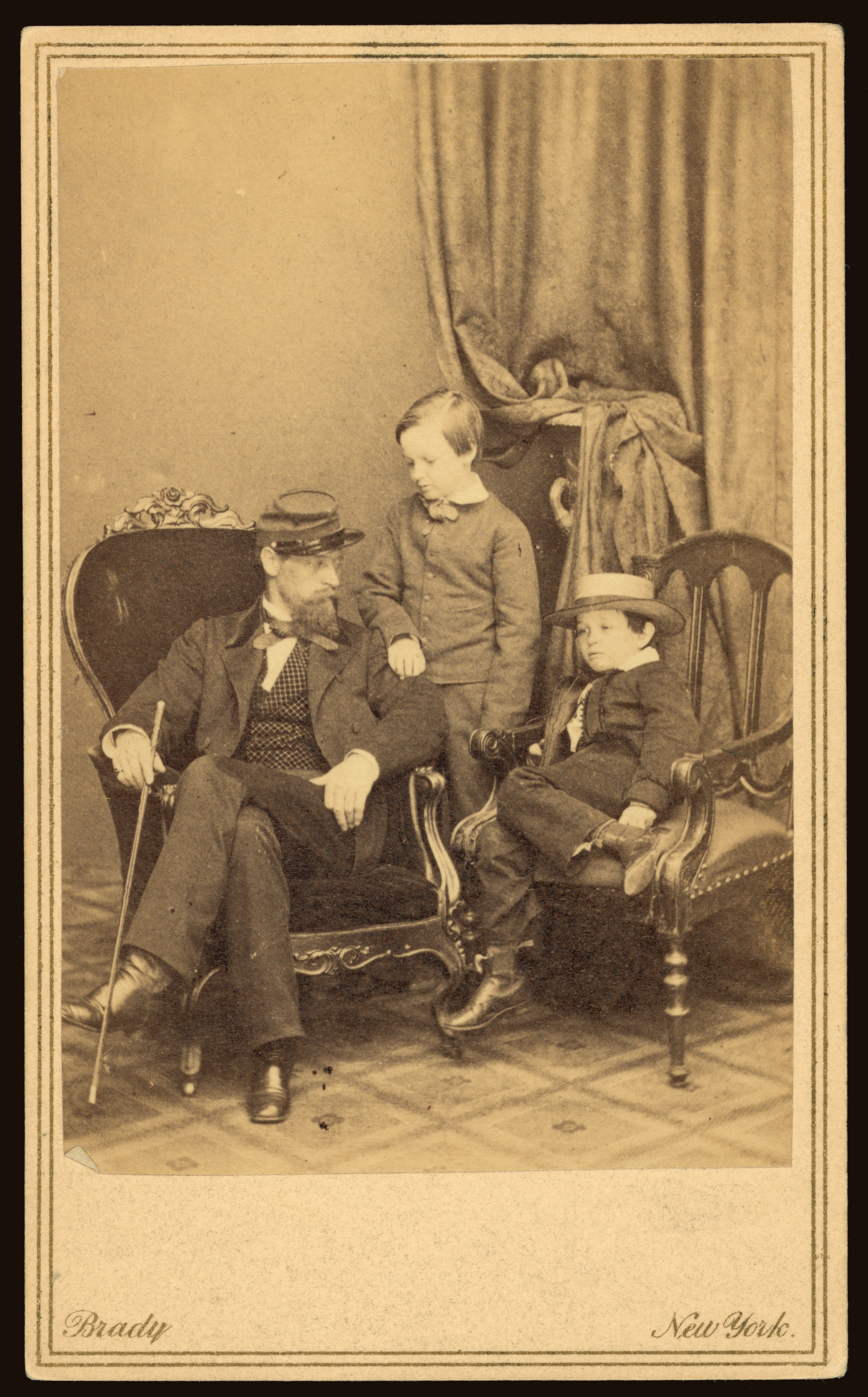
Willie and Tad with Mary's first cousin, Lockwood Todd, in Mathew Brady's studio in 1861

William Wallace Lincoln was born in Springfield, Illinois, on December 21, 1850. He was born just 10 months after the death of his older brother Eddie, who died of tuberculosis earlier that year just shy of his fourth birthday.

Along with his younger brother Tad, Willie was one of the most recognizable members of Lincoln's family. William Herndon, Abraham Lincoln's law partner, wrote about the times Lincoln would bring the boys to work with him: "The boys were absolutely unrestrained in their amusement. If they pulled down all the books from the shelves, bent the points of all the pens, overturned inkstands, scattered law papers over the floor or threw the pencils into the spittoon, it never disturbed the serenity of their father's good nature."

Despite his propensity for mischief, Willie also had a philosophical and thoughtful side, and it was said he was very like his father in this way. Like his father, Willie enjoyed writing and working with words. When his father's friend Edward Baker was killed in action at the Battle of Ball's Bluff in 1861, ten-year-old Willie wrote a eulogy for him that was published in the National Republican. Another time, when his father took him to Chicago in 1859 on a business trip, a wide-eyed Willie wrote home to a friend: "This town is a very beautiful place. Me and father went to two theatres the other night. Me and father have a nice little room to ourselves. We have two little pitchers on a washstand. The smallest one for me the largest one for father. We have two little towels on a top of both pitchers. The smallest one for me, the largest one for father."

When Lincoln took office as President of the United States, Willie and Tad moved into the White House with the rest of their family. To prevent them from becoming too lonely in their new home, Mary asked the wife of federal judge Horatio Nelson Taft, to allow her boys, 14-year-old "Bud" (Horatio Nelson Taft Jr., 1847–1915) and 12-year-old "Holly" (Halsey Cook Taft, 1849–1897), to play with the Lincoln boys at the White House. The boys brought their 16-year-old sister, Julia Taft, to supervise their play. In her later memoir, Julia remembered Willie as being "the most lovable boy I ever knew, bright, sensible, sweet-tempered, and gentle-mannered."

== Death ==
Willie and Tad became very ill in early 1862 with what was known at the time as "bilious fever," most likely typhoid fever caused by contaminated water systems at the White House. After some days, Tad began to grow stronger, but Willie gradually weakened; Abraham and Mary spent much time at his bedside, and Willie died on February 20.

The whole family was deeply affected. Abraham said, "My poor boy. He was too good for this earth. God has called him home. I know that he is much better off in heaven, but then we loved him so much. It is hard, hard to have him die!" After the burial, he shut himself in a room and wept alone. Mary remained in bed for three weeks and was unable to attend Willie's funeral or look after Tad. She never again entered the Green Room, where he was embalmed, or the Prince of Wales room, where he died. Abraham took solace in caring for and comforting Tad, who was still recovering from his illness and was grieving himself for Willie's death. Tad also lost the companionship of Bud and Holly, whom Mary refused to allow in the White House anymore, as they reminded her too much of Willie.

Willie's remains were placed in a mausoleum at Oak Hill Cemetery in Georgetown. After his father's assassination in 1865, they were reinterred at Oak Ridge Cemetery in Springfield, Illinois, first in a receiving tomb and then in 1871 in the state tomb alongside Abraham and Willie's brother, Eddie. Tad and Mary were also later placed in the crypt of the Lincoln Tomb.

== In fiction ==
The 2017 novel Lincoln in the Bardo by George Saunders takes place during and after Willie's death and depicts Abraham's journey through his grief. It won the 2017 Man Booker Prize and was The New York Times bestseller the week of March 5, 2017.

Another 2017 novel was The Murder of Willie Lincoln: A Novel by Burt Solomon (Forge) ISBN 978-0-7653-8583-3.

A fictional version of Willie's death is also depicted in a biographical action horror mashup novel, Abraham Lincoln, Vampire Hunter, by Seth Grahame-Smith and the subsequent movie of the same name based on the novel.

== See also ==
- Lincoln family tree
