= Wilson Ruffin Abbott =

Businessman and landowner in Toronto (c 1801–1876)

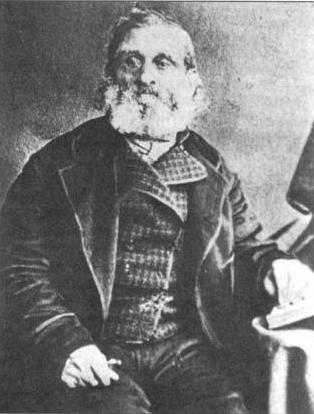
- Born: c. 1801; Richmond, Virginia
- Died: 1876 (aged 74–75); Toronto, Ontario
- Resting place: Necropolis Cemetery; 43.668282°N 79.360259°W
- Occupation: Businessman
- Spouse: Ellen Toyer

Wilson Ruffin Abbott (c. 1801 – 1876) was an American-born Black Canadian and successful businessman and landowner in Toronto, Ontario. He was the father of Anderson Ruffin Abbott, Canada's first Black physician.

== Biography ==
Born to a Scotch-Irish father and a free West African mother in Richmond, Virginia, Wilson Ruffin Abbott left home when he was aged 15 to work as a steward on a Mississippi River steamer.

He married Ellen Toyer, and moved to Akron, Ohio, where he opened a general grocery store, but left in 1834 after receiving a warning that his store was to be pillaged. In late 1835 or early 1836, he moved to Toronto, Upper Canada, where he prospered as a businessman. He served in the militia that protected Toronto from the rebels in the 1837 Upper Canada Rebellion and was elected to Toronto city council in 1840.

His son Anderson Ruffin Abbott in 1861 became the first African Canadian to practise medicine.

== Death ==
Wilson Ruffin Abbott died in Toronto, aged 74 or 75.

== Sources ==
- Winks, Robin W. (1972). "Abbott, Wilson Ruffin". In Hayne, David (ed.). Dictionary of Canadian Biography. Vol. X (1871–1880) (online ed.). University of Toronto Press.
- Hill, Daniel G. (1960). Negroes in Toronto: A Sociological Study of a Minority Group. University of Toronto Press.
- Hill, Daniel G. (1981). The freedom-seekers: Blacks in early Canada. Book Society of Canada. ISBN 0-7725-5283-5.
- "The Freedom Seekers". Black Dominion. 2009. Archived from the original on April 21, 2012.
