= Jim Bishop =

American journalist and author (1907–1987)

- Born: James Alonzo Bishop; November 21, 1907; Jersey City, New Jersey
- Died: July 26, 1987 (aged 79); Delray Beach, Florida
- Occupations: Journalist, author

James Alonzo Bishop (November 21, 1907 – July 26, 1987) was an American journalist and author who wrote the bestselling book The Day Lincoln Was Shot.

== Early life ==
Born in Jersey City, New Jersey, he dropped out of school after eighth grade. In 1923, he studied typing, shorthand, and bookkeeping, and in 1929 began work as a copy boy at the New York Daily News.

== Career ==
In 1930, Bishop got a job as a cub reporter at New York Daily Mirror, where he worked until 1943, when he joined Collier's magazine. He remained there until 1945.

His plans to write for his friend and mentor, Hollywood producer Mark Hellinger, ended with Hellinger's death in 1947. Bishop wrote a biography of Hellinger in 1952.

From 1946 to 1948, Bishop was executive editor of Liberty magazine, he then was director of the literary department at the Music Corporation of America until 1951. Next, he was the founding editor of Gold Medal Books (the juvenile division of Fawcett Publications) until 1953.

In the 1950s, Bishop would do his writing at the Jersey Shore in Sea Bright, New Jersey, going back to his home in Teaneck, New Jersey on weekends to see his wife and children. In 1957, he started his column, Jim Bishop: Reporter, with King Features Syndicate, which continued until 1983. It also landed him on the master list of Nixon political opponents.

Bishop spent the remainder of his career writing biographical books about notable figures and Christian-themed books.

Bishop's book The Day Lincoln Was Shot was published in 1955. Bishop had worked on the book for 24 years. The book was successful, selling more than 3 million copies, and it was translated into 16 languages.

Bishop also wrote The Day Christ Died (1957), The Day Christ Was Born (1960), and The Day Kennedy Was Shot (1968). Perhaps his most critically acclaimed book was FDR's Last Year: April 1944 – April 1945 (1974), which brought to public awareness the secrecy that surrounded President Franklin D. Roosevelt's declining health during World War II.

An autobiography, A Bishop's Confession, was published in 1981.

Writing in Crisis Magazine sixty years after the publication of The Day Christ Died, Michael De Sapio offers these words of admiration for the author:

Jim Bishop was at heart a Catholic who believed in the veracity of the Gospels. There is no biblical revisionism here, no reductive attempts to purge the miraculous out of scripture.

Bishop died of respiratory failure on 26 July 1987 at his home in Delray Beach, Florida.

== Screen adaptations ==
The Day Lincoln Was Shot was dramatized on TV twice, first as a 1956 live special shown on the CBS anthology series Ford Star Jubilee, starring Raymond Massey as Abraham Lincoln and Jack Lemmon as John Wilkes Booth, and again as a 1998 TNT made-for-television film of the same name, starring Lance Henriksen as Lincoln and Rob Morrow as Booth.

The Day Christ Died was made into a television film in 1980, starring Chris Sarandon as Jesus Christ and Keith Michell as Pontius Pilate.
