= John Copcutt Mansion =

Historic house in New York, United States

- U.S. National Register of Historic Places
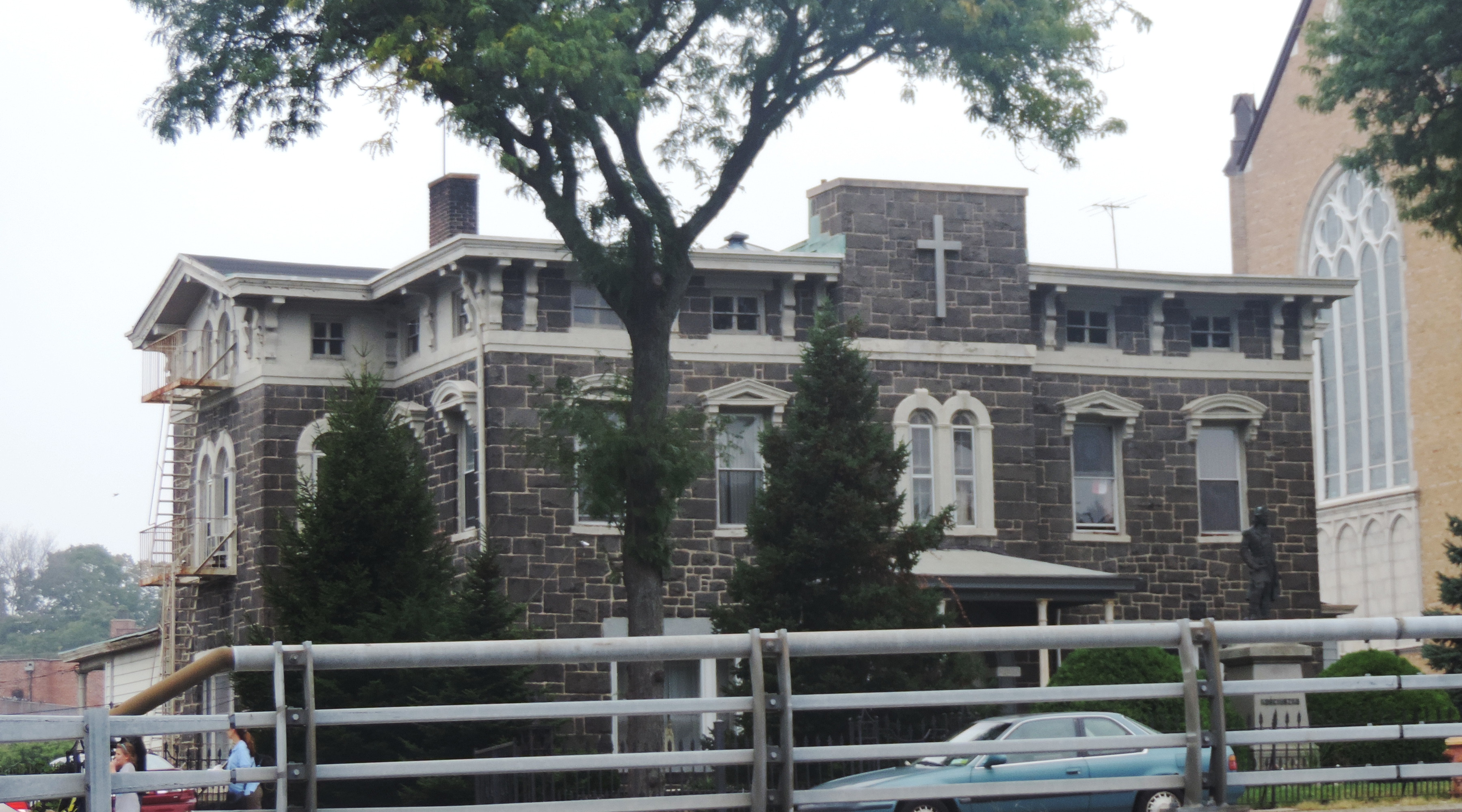
- St. Casimir's Rectory, May 2012

- Location within New York Location within the United States
- Location: 239 Nepperhan Ave., Yonkers, New York
- Coordinates: 40°56′8″N 73°53′32″W
- Area: 1 acre (0.40 ha)
- Built: 1854
- Architectural style: Italian Villa
- NRHP reference No.: 85002283
- Added to NRHP: September 12, 1985

John Copcutt Mansion, also known as Saint Casimir's Rectory, is a historic home located at Yonkers, New York, United States. It was built in 1854 and is cruciform in plan, two and one half stories high in an elaborate Italianate style. It is five bays wide, divided into three sections by a central, projecting three story tower. It was acquired by St. Casimir Roman Catholic Parish in Yonkers in 1900 and used as a convent and, after 1955, a rectory. John Copcutt (1805-1895) was a prominent industrialist and contributed significantly to the development of Yonkers. His daughter married Dr. Charles Leale (1842-1932) in the house.

It was added to the National Register of Historic Places in 1985.
