= Frederick Langdon Hubbard =

- Died: 1953 (aged 74–75)
- Known for: first African Canadian to serve on TTC board

Frederick Langdon Hubbard (1878–1953) was Chairman of the Toronto Transportation Commission from 1929 to 1930. He was the first African Canadian to serve on the TTC board (first as Commissioner and later as Chairman). Born in Toronto in 1878, Hubbard was son of a high profile African Canadian and Toronto politician William Peyton Hubbard and son-in-law to the first African Canadian licensed to practice medicine in Ontario Anderson Ruffin Abbott (whom he married daughter Grace Isabell Abbott).

Hubbard worked for the Toronto Street Railway from 1906 to 1921, and served as the chair of the TTC from 1929 to 1930, vice-chair in 1931 and a commissioner from 1932 to 1939.

A historical plaque was installed in 2014 at his former residence of 662 Broadview Avenue.

== Legacy ==
Hubbard Boulevard in the Beach area of Toronto is named from him.

== External source ==
Ancestry and unretouched photo of Frederick Langdon Hubbard:

Preceded by P. W. Ellis	Chairman of the Toronto Transportation Commission; 1929–1930	Succeeded by William C. McBrien
