= Julia Taft Bayne =

Companion of the Abraham Lincoln family

- Born: Julia Taft; March 4, 1845 Lyons, New York
- Died: December 14, 1933 (aged 88) Champaign, Illinois
- Subject: Memoir of the Lincoln White House

Julia Taft Bayne (March 4, 1845 – December 14, 1933) was an American author who wrote a memoir of the Lincoln White House entitled Tad Lincoln's Father (1931), based on her time visiting the household as a teenager with her younger brothers.

== Early life and education ==
Julia Taft was born on March 4, 1845, in Lyons, New York, to Horatio Nelson Taft, an attorney and examiner in the U.S. Patent Office, and his wife. The family lived in Washington D.C. when Julia was a child and young woman.

As the young sons of President Abraham Lincoln had no playmates at the White House, the First Lady Mary Lincoln asked Mrs. Taft if she had children who might come to see them. Mrs. Taft asked her daughter Julia to take 14-year-old Horatio Nelson Jr., or Bud, and 11-year-old Halsey Cook Taft, called Holly, with her to the White House to play with the Lincoln boys. During this time, Julia Taft was befriended by Mary and President Lincoln. After Willie Lincoln died of typhoid fever on February 20, 1862, the Taft children stopped visiting the White House.

Julia Bayne's half brother Charles Sabin Taft was a physician; he was one of the first doctors on the scene when President Lincoln was shot on April 14, 1865 at Ford's Theatre. He remained with the President until his death.

== Marriage and family ==
She had a daughter and four sons, all of whom survived her.

== Publication ==
In 1931, just two years before her death, Julia Bayne published her memoir, Tad Lincoln's Father, based on her visits to the White House of the Lincolns. Bayne's memoir provides a unique glimpse into the social and family life of the Lincoln White House. In the work, she wrote of her initial fear of the towering, rough-and-tumble Lincoln, who won her over with teasing. She also discussed an emerging relationship with Mary, who had no daughters and so took particular comfort in Julia's presence.

She died at the home of her daughter, Mrs. Frank H. West, in Champaign, Illinois.

In 2001, Tad Lincoln's Father was reprinted by Bison Books, University of Nebraska Press (ISBN 0803261918).
