= Charles Sabin Taft =

American physician

Charles Sabin Taft (August 1835 – December 18, 1900) was a bystander physician who was pressed into service during the assassination of Abraham Lincoln.

== Lincoln's assassination ==
On April 14, 1865, Taft was watching Our American Cousin at Ford's Theatre in Washington, D.C., which President Abraham Lincoln was attending. Taft had a good view of those in the presidential box. He observed that First Lady Mary Todd Lincoln often called her husband's attention to aspects of the action onstage, and "seemed to take great pleasure in witnessing his enjoyment". After Lincoln was shot, Taft was boosted up from the stage to the president's box.

== See also ==
- Anderson Ruffin Abbott
- Joseph K. Barnes
- Julia Taft Bayne
- Charles H. Crane
- Albert Freeman Africanus King
- Charles Augustus Leale

== Sources ==
- Kunhardt, Dorothy Meserve, and Kunhardt Jr., Phillip B. Twenty Days: A Narrative in Text and Pictures of the Assassination of Abraham Lincoln and the Twenty Days and Nights That Followed. New York: Castle Books, 1965.
