= Anderson Ruffin Abbott =

Canadian physician

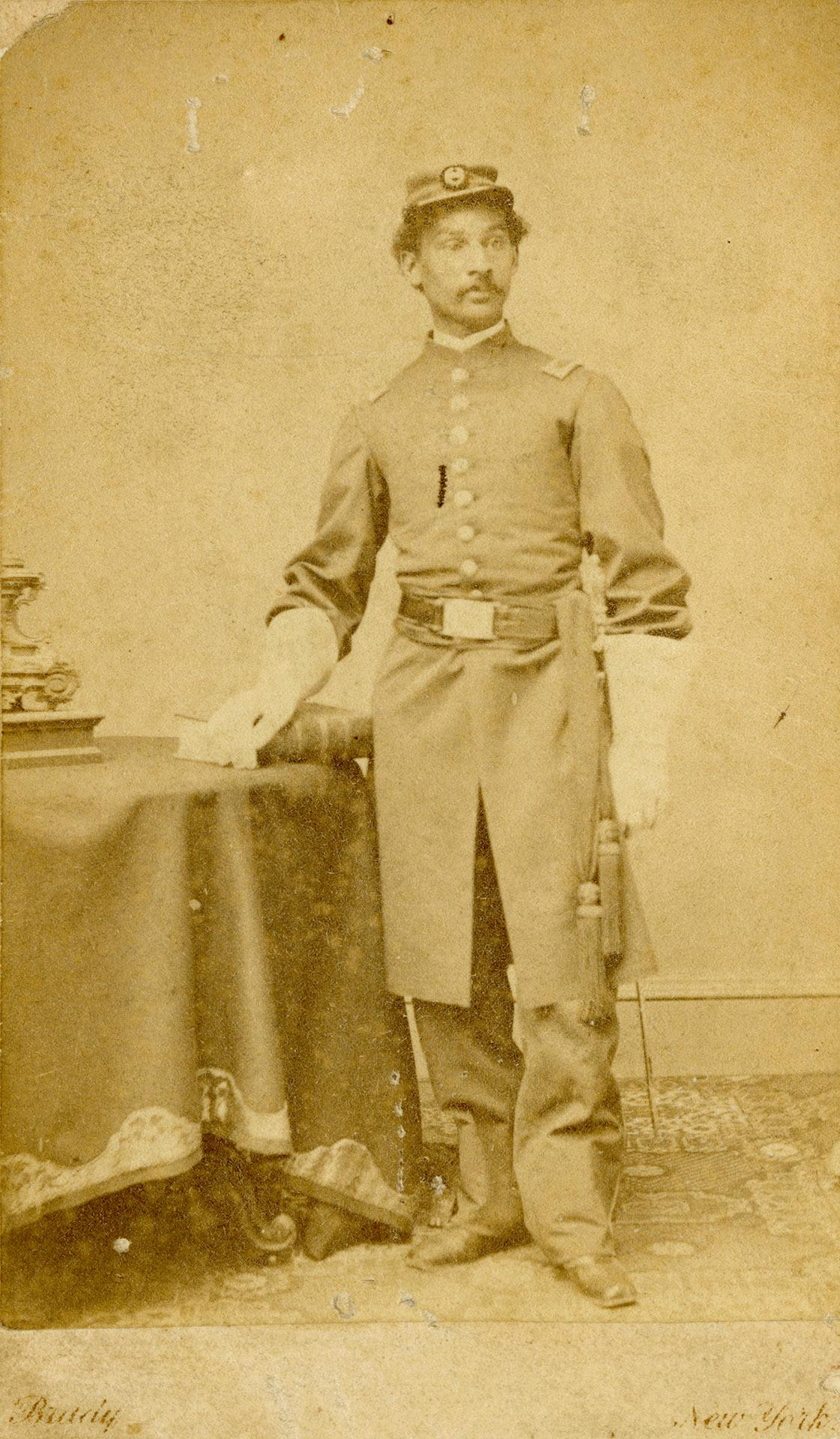
- Abbott, c. 1863
- Born: 7 April 1837; Toronto, Upper Canada
- Died: 29 December 1913 (aged 76); Toronto, Ontario, Canada
- Other name: Doctor Abbott
- Education: University of Toronto
- Occupation: Doctor of Medicine
- Spouse: Mary Ann Casey
- Children: 5
- Father: Wilson Ruffin Abbott
- Relatives: Frederick Langdon Hubbard (son-in-law)
- Military career
- Allegiance: United States
- Branch: Army
- Rank: 1st Lieutenant (functional); Captain (honorary)
- Unit: 7th United States Colored Infantry Regiment
- Commands: Freedman's Hospital
- Conflicts: American Civil War

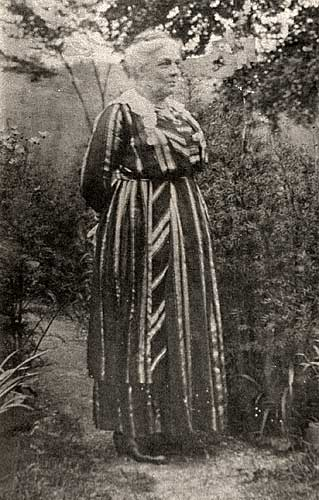
Abbott's wife, Mary Ann Casey

Anderson Ruffin Abbott (7 April 1837 – 29 December 1913) was a Canadian physician and an officer in the Union army during the American Civil War. He was the first Black Canadian to be licensed as a physician in Ontario and second in Canada after William Wright. After his American war service, he became the coroner and later surgeon-in-chief in Kent County, Ontario.

== Early life ==
Abbott was born on 7 April 1837 in Toronto to African Americans parents Wilson Ruffin and Mary Ellen Toyer Abbott. The Abbotts were a prominent Black family in Toronto, who had left Alabama—as free people of colour—after receiving a warning that their store was to be ransacked. After first living a short time in New York, they settled in Upper Canada in 1835 or 1836. Wilson Abbott soon began to purchase real estate, in and around Toronto, where he owned 48 properties by 1871. The senior Abbott also became active in politics.

The family's prosperity allowed the younger Abbott to receive an excellent education. He attended both private and public schools, including William King's school, in the black Elgin settlement (now North Buxton, Ontario). He was an honour student at the Toronto Academy and later attended Oberlin College in Ohio. He returned to Canada and in 1857, entered University College in Toronto and in 1858, became a medical student at the Toronto School of Medicine. He studied under Alexander Thomas Augusta, a black physician who was born in the United States. Although he did not graduate, Abbott received a licence to practise from the Medical Board of Upper Canada, in 1861, thus becoming the first Canadian-born Black physician.

== Career ==
In June 1863 Abbott moved to Washington, D.C., following Dr. Augusta. Dr. Augusta was the first Black surgeon commissioned in the Union army during the American Civil War, serving with the 7th Colored Infantry Regiment with the rank of Major in the Union Army. Dr. Abbott received the rank of lieutenant as a contract surgeon. Both wore the uniforms of the Union Army. Alongside Augusta, Dr. Abbott treated both Black soldiers from the United States Colored Troops (USCT) and Black civilians at Contraband Hospital, later renamed Freedmen's Hospital. As of November 1864, Abbott became surgeon-in-charge of Contraband Hospital.

On 23 February 1864, Drs. Augusta and Abbott attended a White House reception in military uniform, possibly the first Black military officers to do so. They were greeted courteously by President Lincoln, but their presence disturbed Lincoln's son Robert and stunned many of the other guests. Abbott later said that "We could not have been more surprised ourselves or created more surprise if we had been dropped down upon them through a sky-light."

In Washington, Abbott lived at the same boarding house as Elizabeth Keckley. After Abraham Lincoln was shot on 14 April 1865, Mary Lincoln sent a messenger to the boarding house sometime after midnight Saturday to find Elizabeth Keckley. Abbott escorted Keckley, first to the White House and finally to Petersen House. He left Petersen House and learned of Lincoln's death when church bells tolled at 7:20 a.m. that morning. After Lincoln's death, Abbott went to the viewing of the body in the East Room of the White House. Mary Lincoln gave him a black-and-white shawl that had been worn by Abraham Lincoln. The shawl was loaned to the State Historical Society of Wisconsin in 1959 and officially donated to the Society's collections in 1963, where it remains today.

In 1866, Abbott resigned from service to the Union Army and returned to Canada. He attended primary medical classes at the University of Toronto the following year. While he did not graduate, he established a medical practice and was admitted to the College of Physicians and Surgeons of Ontario in 1871. In an Anglican wedding ceremony in Toronto on 9 August 1871, he married Mary Ann Casey, the 18-year-old daughter of a successful Black barber. Abbott and his wife moved to Chatham where he resumed his medical practice. They eventually had three daughters and two sons.

Like his father, Abbott soon became an important member of the Black community in Toronto. From 1873 to 1880, he fought against racially segregated schools as president of the Wilberforce Educational Institute and was appointed coroner for Kent County, Ontario, in 1874, the first Black man to hold that office. Abbott contributed to a local newspaper, the Chatham Planet, and was associate editor of the Missionary Messenger, the journal of the local British Methodist Episcopal Church. Abbott was made president of both the Chatham Literary and Debating Society and the Chatham Medical Society in 1878. Abbott moved his medical practice to Dundas, Ontario, in 1881 where he also served in some important community roles including trustee of that community's high school and chairman of the town's internal management committee from 1885 to 1889. He also worked as an administrator for the Dundas Mechanics' Institute.

The family moved to Oakville, Ontario in 1889 but returned to Toronto the following year. He was elected a member of the local post of the Grand Army of the Republic and one of 273 Civil War veterans in Toronto to wear the badge of that fraternity. He was then known as "Captain Abbott", a rank which might reflect his office within the Grand Army of the Republic rather than his actual rank during the American Civil War. In November 1892, Abbott was appointed aide-de-camp on the Staff of the Commanding Officers Dept. of New York. A source of great pride for Abbott and his family, this was the highest military honour ever bestowed on a Black person in Canada or the United States.

In 1894, Abbott was appointed surgeon-in-chief at Provident Hospital in Chicago, the first training hospital for Black nurses in the United States. He became the hospital's medical superintendent In 1896 but resigned the following year. Returning to Toronto, Abbott resumed his private practice and became more involved with writing for various publications including The Colored American Magazine of Boston and New York, the Anglo-American Magazine of London (for which he wrote "Some recollections of Lincoln's assassination"), and New York Age. Medicine, Black history, the Civil War, Darwinism, biology, and poetry were among his topics.

== Debates ==
At the turn of the century Abbott became embroiled in the debate between W. E. B. Du Bois and Booker T. Washington over social change. Siding with Du Bois, Abbott believed that Black access to higher education was essential and should not be compromised. Believing that blacks would be culturally assimilated, Abbott wrote: "It is just as natural for two races living together on the same soil to blend as it is for the waters of two river tributaries to mingle." With Canada's black population on the decline, he thought this was especially true in his own country and wrote "by the process of absorption and expatriation the colour line will eventually fade out in Canada".

== Death ==
Anderson Ruffin Abbott died in 1913, at the age of 76, in the Toronto home of his son-in-law, Frederick Langdon Hubbard, (Toronto Transportation Commission Chairman from 1929 to 1930, and son of his long-time friend William Peyton Hubbard). He is buried in the Toronto Necropolis. Anderson Ruffin Abbott's archival fonds was donated to the Toronto Public Library by his daughter Grace (Abbott) Hubbard in 1963. A portion of it has been digitized and is available online through the Toronto Public Library, while the rest can be found as part of the Baldwin Collection of Canadiana at Toronto Reference Library.

Abbott's home at 119 Dowling Avenue, also known as Dr. Anderson Ruffin Abbott House, was where he lived from 1890 to 1903.
