= Petersen House =

House in Washington, D.C.

- U.S. Historic district – Contributing property
- U.S. National Historic Site
- D.C. Inventory of Historic Sites
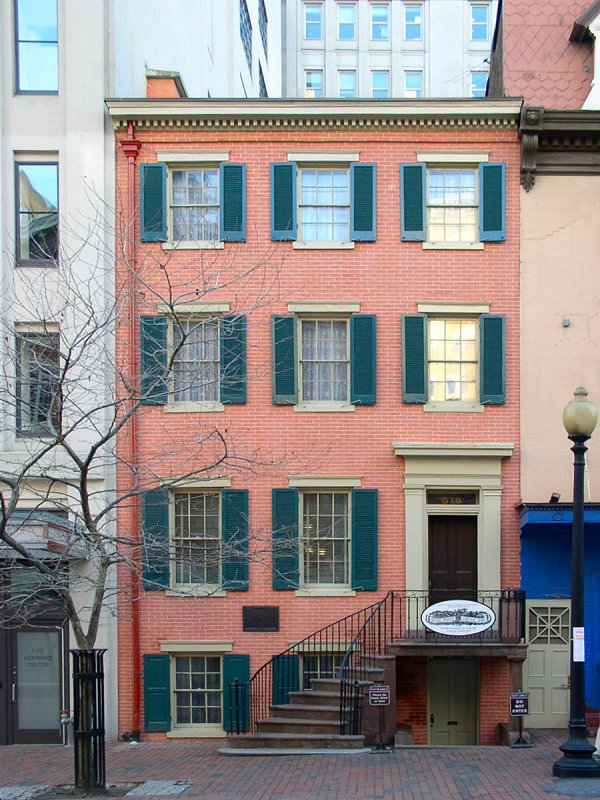
- February 2012

- Location within the United States
- Location: 516 10th St., N.W. (between E and F Sts.); Washington, D.C., U.S.
- Coordinates: 38°53′48.4″N 77°1′34.4″W
- Area: 0.29 acres (1,200 m^{2})
- Built: 1849; 177 years ago
- Architectural style: Late Victorian
- Part of: Ford's Theatre National Historic Site (ID66000034)
- DCIHS No.: 473

Significant dates
- Designated CP: October 15, 1966
- Designated NHS: February 12, 2017
- Designated DCIHS: November 8, 1964

The Petersen House is a 19th-century federal style row house in the United States in Washington, D.C., located at 516 10th Street NW, several blocks east of the White House. It is known for being the house where President Abraham Lincoln died on April 15, 1865 after being shot the previous evening at Ford's Theatre located across the street.

The house was built in 1849 by William A. Petersen, a German tailor. Future vice-president John C. Breckinridge, a friend of the Lincoln family, rented this house in 1852. It served as a boarding house in 1865 and has been a museum since the 1930s, currently administered by the National Park Service.

== Lincoln assassination ==
On the night of April 14, 1865, Lincoln and his wife Mary Todd were attending a performance of Our American Cousin when John Wilkes Booth, an actor and Southern sympathizer, entered the box and shot the President in the back of the head. Henry Rathbone and Clara Harris were also in the box with the Lincolns, and Rathbone suffered serious stab wounds while trying to prevent Booth's escape. Doctors including Charles Leale and Charles Sabin Taft examined Lincoln in the box before having him carried across the street to the Petersen House, where boarder Henry Safford directed them inside.

Upon re-examining Lincoln, only to discover that his extremities were cold, physicians continually removed blood clots which formed over the wound and poured out the excess cerebral fluid and brain matter from where the bullet had entered Lincoln's head in order to relieve pressure on the brain. However, the external and internal hemorrhaging continued throughout the night.

During the night and early morning, guards patrolled outside to prevent onlookers from coming inside the house. Lincoln's Cabinet members, generals, and various members of Congress were allowed to see the President, except Secretary of State William Seward, who was nearly killed in an assassination attempt by Lewis Powell, one of John Wilkes Booth's henchmen, on the same night as the assassination of Lincoln.

Abraham Lincoln died in the house on April 15, 1865, at 7:22 a.m., aged 56. Individuals in the room when he died included his son Robert Todd Lincoln; Senator Charles Sumner; generals Henry Wager Halleck, Richard James Oglesby, Corporal James Tanner, and Montgomery C. Meigs; and Secretary of War Edwin Stanton. Booth was located in Virginia two weeks later and was shot by one of the Union soldiers, Sergeant Boston Corbett, dying less than three hours later.

== Today ==
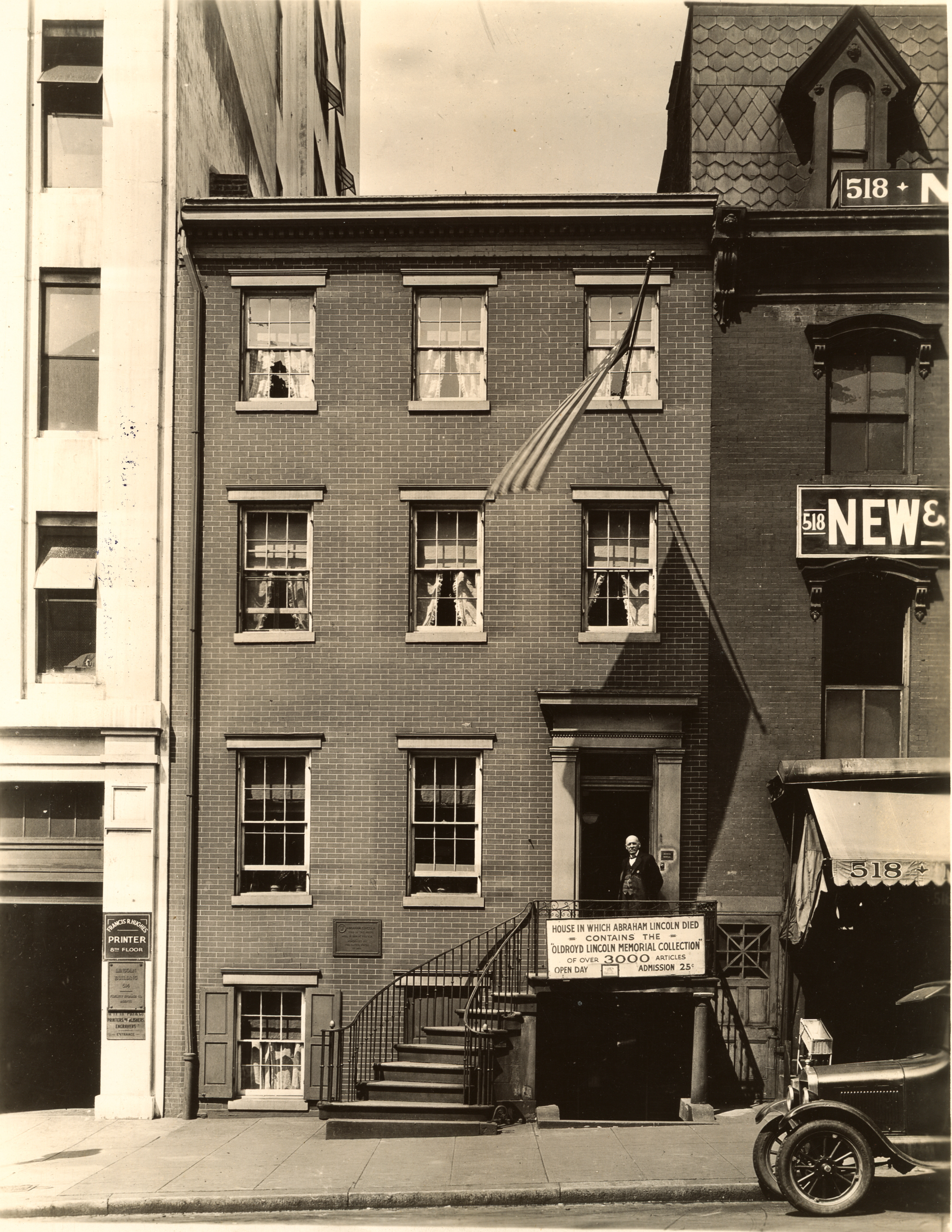
Petersen House, 1925. On the stoop is Osborn H. I. Oldroyd, an authority on Abraham Lincoln.

Since 1933, the National Park Service has maintained Petersen House as a historical museum, recreating the scene at the time of Lincoln's death. The bed that Lincoln occupied and other items from the bedroom were bought by Chicago collector Charles F. Gunther, and are now owned by and on display at the Chicago History Museum. Gunther purchased the bed from publisher Andrew Boyd in 1877. The Chicago Historical Society acquired it from Gunther's estate in 1920. Replicas have taken their places. The bloodstained pillow and pillowcases are the ones used by Lincoln. Also featured is a large tower of books about Lincoln.

The house is administered by the National Park Service as part of the Ford's Theatre National Historic Site. Usually, the house is open to visitors daily from 9:00 a.m. to 5:00 p.m. Admission is free but requires a timed ticket.

== Gallery ==
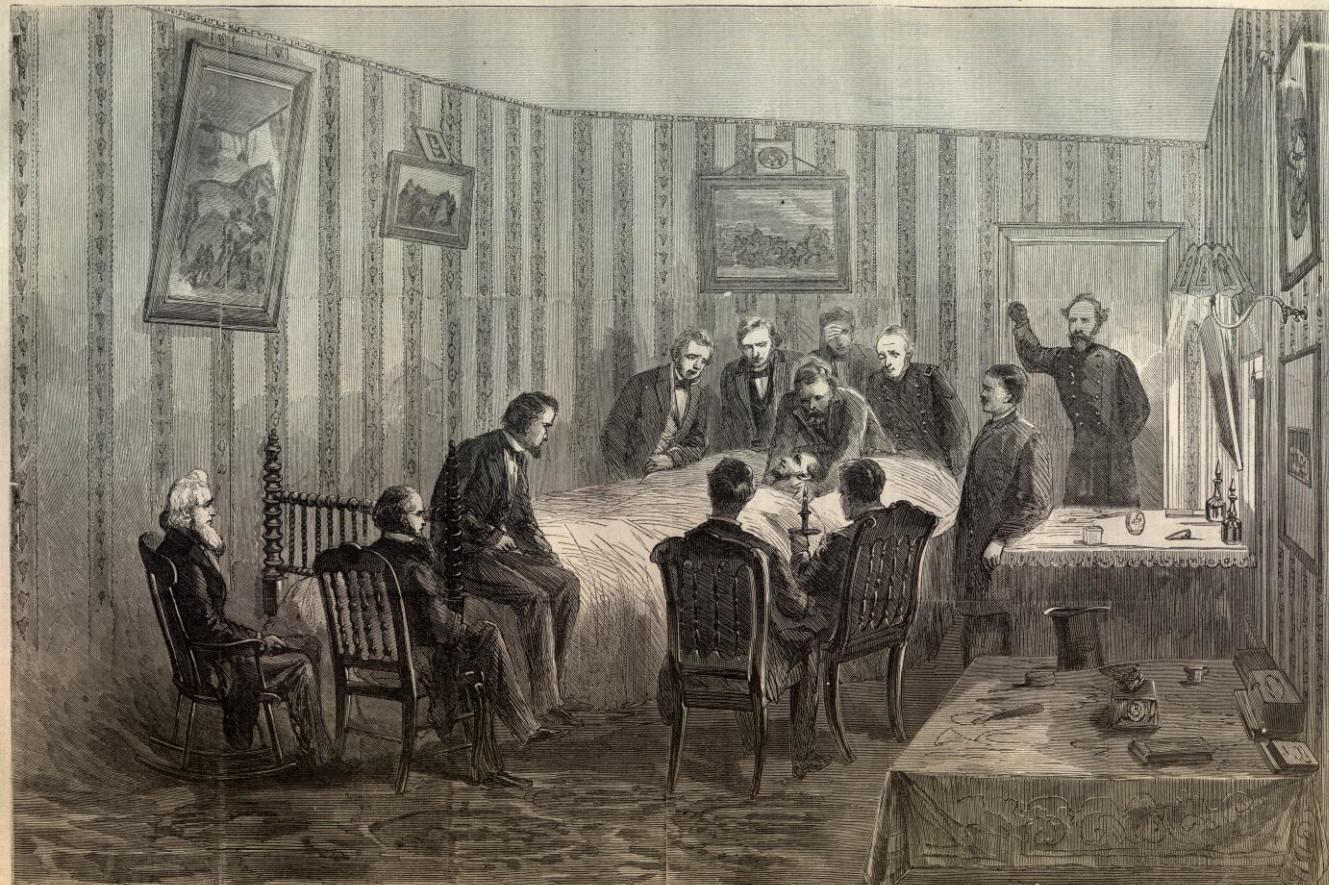
Lincoln on his deathbed

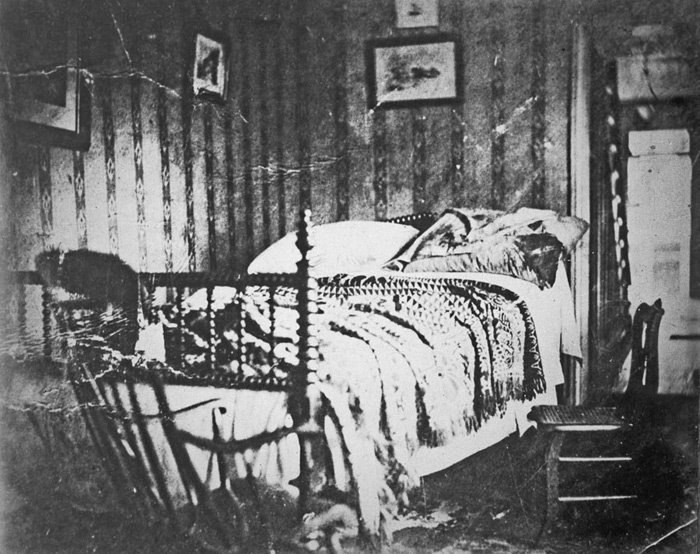
Lincoln's deathbed

The room in the Petersen House where Abraham Lincoln died

The pillow Abraham Lincoln died on

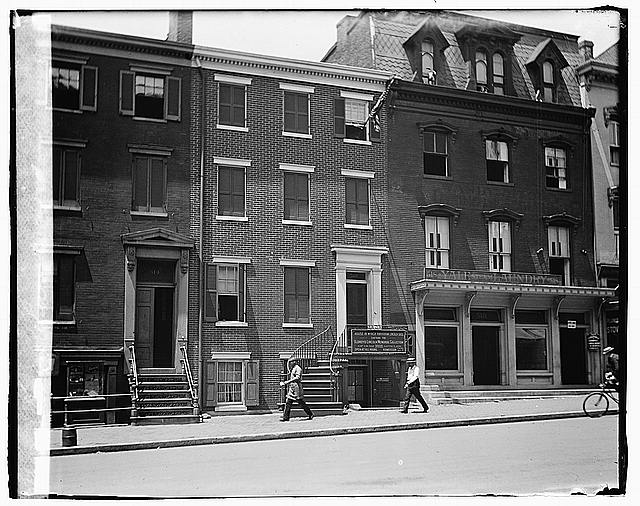
Petersen House circa 1918. The commemorative plaque, seen later in the 1925 photo, had not yet been installed.

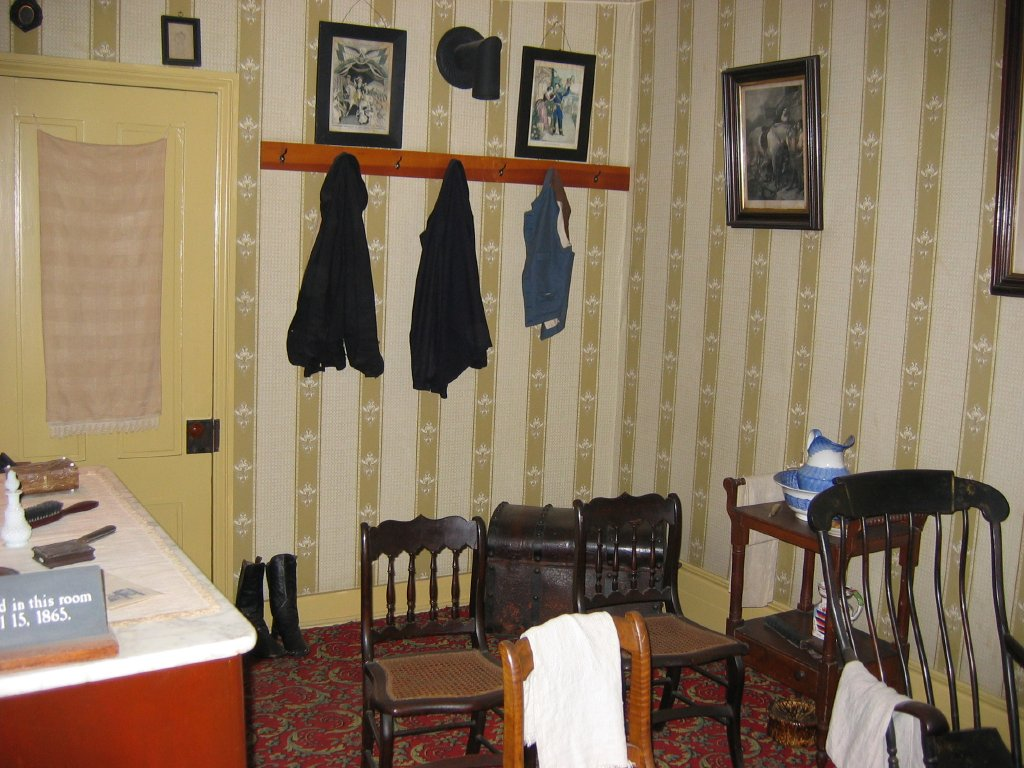
A modern recreation of the bedroom

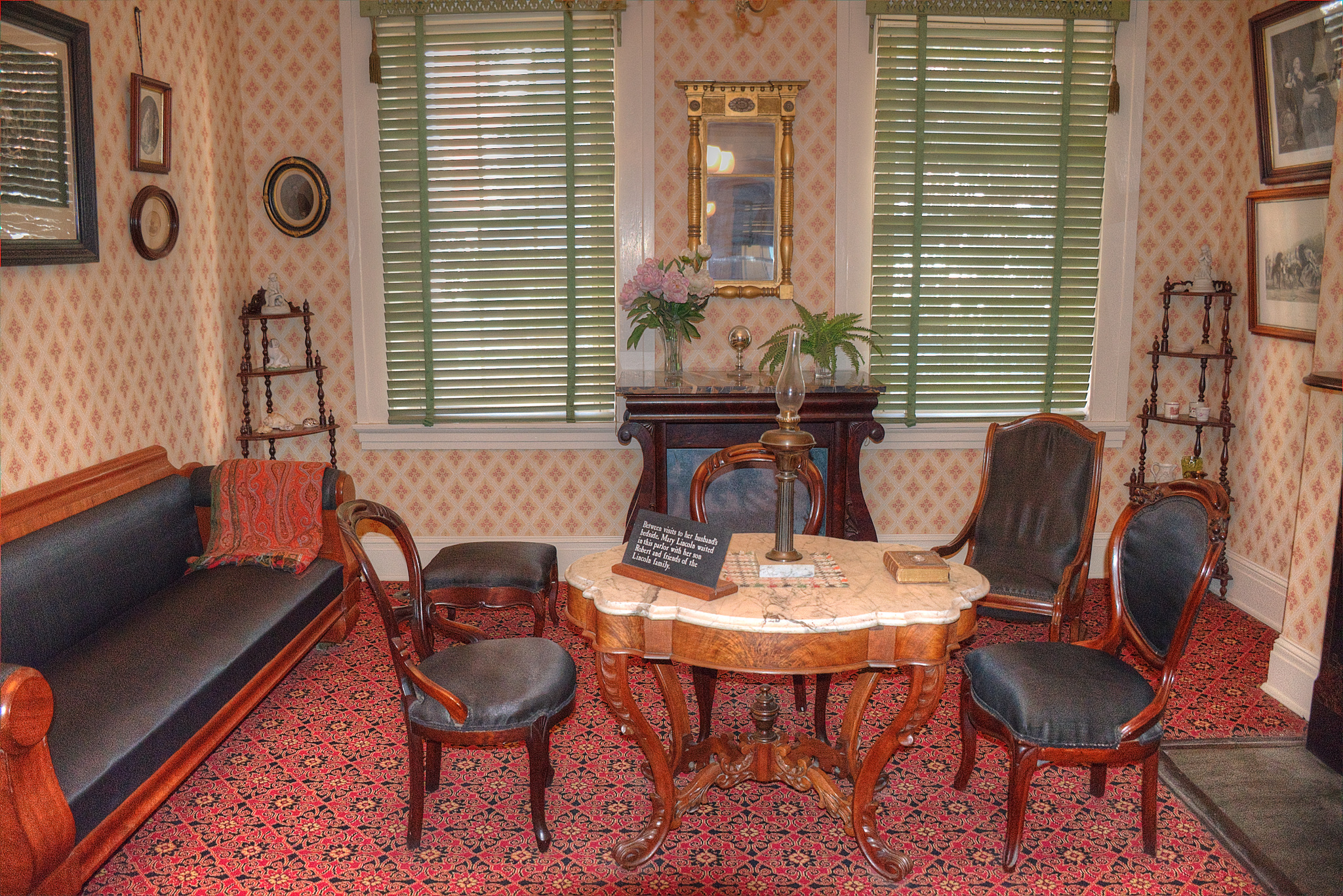
The front parlor
