= John Speed (disambiguation) =

John Speed (1542–1629) was an English cartographer and historian.

John Speed may also refer to:

- John Speed (martyr) (died 1594), English Roman Catholic martyr
- John James Speed (1803–1867), American farmer, merchant, politician, and pioneer in telegraphy
- John Speed (Kentucky), judge and owner of Farmington in Louisville, Kentucky, and father of Joshua Fry Speed and James Speed
- Police Sergeant John Richard Speed, 1984 (shot dead; posthumously awarded the Queen's Commendation for Brave Conduct)

== See also ==
- John Speed Smith (1792–1854), U.S. Representative
