= Speed (name) =

Speed, as a name, may refer to:

== Surname ==
- Ameer Speed (born 1999), American football player
- Benjamin Speed, Australian film composer and musician
- Carol Speed (1945–2022), American author, singer, and actress
- Chris Speed (born 1967), American jazz musician
- Doris Speed (1899–1994), English actress
- E. J. Speed (born 1996), American football player
- Gary Speed (1969–2011), Welsh football player and manager
- Harold Speed (1872–1957), English artist
- Horace Speed (1852–1924), Oklahoma Territory's first US Attorney
- Horace Speed (baseball) (1951–2025), American baseball player
- James Speed (1812–1887), Kentucky legislator and Attorney General of the United States
- James Breckenridge Speed (1844–1912), Louisville businessman and philanthropist
- James Davis Speed (1915–2006), American politician
- James S. Speed (1811–1860), ninth mayor of Louisville, Kentucky
- John Speed (1542–1629), English cartographer
- John Speed (Kentucky) (1772–1840), American judge and farmer
- Joshua Fry Speed (1814–1882), American businessman and intimate friend of Abraham Lincoln
- Keith Speed (1934–2018), English politician
- Kuini Speed (1949–2004), Fijian chief and politician
- Lake Speed (born 1948), American stock car driver
- Lancelot Speed (1860–1931), British book illustrator
- Lucy Speed (born 1976), English actress
- Malcolm Speed (born 1948), Australian businessman and sports administrator
- Ronski Speed (born 1975), German music producer and DJ
- Scott Speed (born 1983), American race car driver

== Given name ==
- Speed S. Fry (1817–1892), American lawyer and judge

== Nickname ==
- Charles W. "Speed" Holman (1898–1931), American aviator, barnstormer, wing walker and parachutist
- Timothy "Speed" Levitch (born 1970), American actor, author, and tour guide
- Carl Shipp "Speed" Marvel (1894–1988), American chemist
- Pepe Smith (1947–2019), Pinoy rock singer and drummer, member of the trio Speed, Glue & Shinki
- Art Spector (1920–1987), American basketball player
- Björn Strid (born 1978), Swedish heavy metal singer
- Irving Speed Vogel (1918–2008), American sculptor, painter, and writer
- William Speed Weed, American television writer and producer
- William H. "Speed" Gardner (1895–1972), American auto racer
- Darren Watkins Jr. (born 2005), American YouTuber, streamer and internet personality known as IShowSpeed

== Fictional characters ==
- Blazey H. Speed, a character in Ninjago
- Speed (character), member of the Young Avengers in the Marvel Universe
- Speed Racer (character), title character of Speed Racer, a manga and anime series
- Speed Saunders, DC Comics character
- Speedy Buggy, title character of Speed Buggy, a Hanna-Barbera television series
- Tony "Speed" Malatesta, one of the title characters of Mother, Jugs & Speed, a 1976 film
- Speed, one of the characters in The Odd Couple, a 1965 play, and its adaptations
- Claude Speed, the main character of Grand Theft Auto III and GTA 2.

== See also ==
- Speed (disambiguation)
