= Seneca Gardens, Kentucky =

- City
- Location of Seneca Gardens in Jefferson County, Kentucky

- Location within the state of Kentucky Seneca Gardens (the United States)
- Coordinates: 38°13′38″N 85°40′38″W
- Country: United States
- State: Kentucky
- County: Jefferson
- Incorporated: 1941

Area
  - Total: 0.15 sq mi (0.40 km^{2})
  - Land: 0.15 sq mi (0.40 km^{2})
  - Water: 0 sq mi (0.00 km^{2})
- Elevation: 548 ft (167 m)

Population (2020)
  - Total: 674
  - Density: 4,401.1/sq mi (1,699.29/km^{2})
- Time zone: UTC-5 (Eastern (EST))
  - Summer (DST): UTC-4 (EDT)
- ZIP Code: 40205
- FIPS code: 21-69384
- GNIS feature ID: 2405445
- Website: www.cityofsenecagardens.com

Seneca Gardens is a home rule-class city in Jefferson County, Kentucky, United States, and a part of the Louisville Metro government. With the single exception of the Keneseth Israel Synagogue, all buildings within city limits are residential. As of the 2020 census, Seneca Gardens had a population of 674.

== History ==
The site of the present city was originally part of Farmington, the 1810 estate of the Hon. John Speed and his second wife Lucy Gilmer Fry. Abraham Lincoln was a friend of the judge's son Joshua and spent three weeks at Farmington in 1841 while courting Mary Todd of Lexington. Lincoln would later name Joshua his Attorney General during his second administration.

The Speeds sold off sections of their estate. Most of the present area of Seneca Gardens was purchased from the family in 1825 and 1846 by the German gardener Jacob Wetstein. He established the Methodist Westein Community Church on the corner of his property facing Taylorsville Road, and local legend credited him with participating in the Underground Railroad. Wetstein's granddaughter's husband Edward F. Weigel, president of the Wetstein Land Company, mortgaged the estate to participate in the development of Broadmeade.

The remainder of the community was purchased from the Speeds by another German immigrant, Paul Discher, who was listed in the 1871 Louisville Directory as a "huckster". His descendants established the Discher Land Company and participated with Weigel in the development of Broadmeade and the present community of Seneca Gardens in 1922. Owing to Weigel's mortgages, however, the 1929 stock market crash ruined him, and his share of the land fell to his creditors.

The Fidelity and Columbia Trust Company, which had constructed and maintained the roads and lighting system free of charge as part of its investment in the community, continued to do so until 1939, when it liquidated its interests in the community. Louisville had just commissioned a study suggesting that all-residential communities such as Seneca Gardens cost more in services than they provided in revenue, and Mayor Scholtz declined to annex the community. Instead, they petitioned the Jefferson Circuit Court (action #261,927) to incorporate the community on September 26 and met to form the first government on October 2. (The Commonwealth of Kentucky's Land Office records the city as being incorporated in 1941.) The first city budget called for $1,600 in expenditures, requiring a property tax of 25¢ per $100 of assessed value.

Owing to the growing conflict in Europe, the U.S. Army established a large base at Bowman Field in 1940. Studies undertaken during its construction led the U.S. Surgeon General's office to contact the City Board of Trustees to complain about the community's sewage. At the time, the houses used separate septic tanks, but their functioning was greatly impaired by the area's exposed and porous limestone. Sewage was draining into the city's streams and ditches and running into Beargrass Creek, affecting the new army base. Preparations for the construction of a unified sewer were suspended by the entrance of the United States into World War II in late 1941, bringing in wartime rationing of men and materiel.

The city annexed some neighboring lots between Trevilian and Taylorsville roads and the area around Valletta in 1941. In 1943, some lots on the eastern side of Carolina Avenue, found to be half within Seneca Gardens and half within Louisville, opted to remove themselves to the latter by a vote of 23–3. The same year, the U.S. Army advised the city trustees that rationing no longer prevented construction of an improved sewer system, and locals approved a bond issue.

Louisville attempted to use the issue to demand annexation of the city, but a referendum in November 1944 clearly opposed that. The referendum was legally voided on technical grounds, but Louisville accepted the annexation would not occur. It permitted Seneca Gardens to connect to its system, but set a price that city trustees found excessive. It wasn't until 1946 that a price was agreed upon and a second set of bonds issued to cover the expense and construction costs.

The same year, Cardinal Hill and two lots facing Seneca Park Road south of Trevilian were annexed. This left Seneca Gardens entirely surrounded as an enclave within Louisville after 1948, although the borders were not completely finalized until the 1950 annexation of the original Wetstein home and some lots along Valletta, including the Keneseth Israel Synagogue.

The municipal government has employed a City Arborist since 1990, who oversees tree planting and helps residents obtain trees at reduced prices.

== Geography ==
Seneca Gardens is located in central Jefferson County between Woodbourne Avenue, Carolina Avenue, Taylorsville Road, and Bowman Field and Seneca Park in Greater Louisville. It is bordered to the south, across Taylorsville Road, by Strathmoor Village and Kingsley, and on all other sides by Louisville. Downtown Louisville is 5 miles (8 km) to the northwest.

According to the United States Census Bureau, Seneca Gardens has a total area of 0.2 square miles (0.4 km^{2}), all land.

== Demographics ==
Historical population
| Census | Pop. | Note | %± |
|---|---|---|---|
| 1950 | 868 | | — |
| 1960 | 928 | | 6.9% |
| 1970 | 822 | | −11.4% |
| 1980 | 748 | | −9.0% |
| 1990 | 684 | | −8.6% |
| 2000 | 699 | | 2.2% |
| 2010 | 696 | | −0.4% |
| 2020 | 674 | | −3.2% |
U.S. Decennial Census

As of the census of 2000, there were 699 people, 294 households, and 211 families residing in the city. The population density was 4,286.1 inhabitants per square mile (1,654.9/km^{2}). There were 305 housing units at an average density of 1,870.2 per square mile (722.1/km^{2}). The racial makeup of the city was 98.00% White, 1.29% African American, 0.14% Asian, and 0.57% from two or more races. Hispanic or Latino of any race were 1.00% of the population.

There were 294 households, out of which 28.2% had children under the age of 18 living with them, 64.6% were married couples living together, 6.8% had a female householder with no husband present, and 27.9% were non-families. 23.8% of all households were made up of individuals, and 10.9% had someone living alone who was 65 years of age or older. The average household size was 2.38 and the average family size was 2.84.

In the city the population was spread out, with 23.0% under the age of 18, 4.4% from 18 to 24, 23.7% from 25 to 44, 32.3% from 45 to 64, and 16.5% who were 65 years of age or older. The median age was 44 years. For every 100 females, there were 94.7 males. For every 100 females age 18 and over, there were 85.5 males.

The median income for a household in the city was $63,750, and the median income for a family was $83,662. Males had a median income of $57,375 versus $39,375 for females. The per capita income for the city was $36,343. None of the families and 2.0% of the population were living below the poverty line, including no under eighteens and 4.1% of those over 64.
