= James Speed (disambiguation) =

James Speed may refer to:

- James Speed (1812–1887), US attorney general
- James Speed (Australian politician) (1856–1925), Australian politician
- James Breckenridge Speed (1844–1912), president of the Louisville Railway Company
- James Stephens Speed (1811–1860), mayor of Louisville, Kentucky
- James Davis Speed, member of the North Carolina House of Representatives
