= Strathmoor =

Strathmoor may refer to one of two sixth class cities in Jefferson County, Kentucky

- Strathmoor Village, Kentucky
- Strathmoor Manor, Kentucky
