= Strathmoor, Kentucky =

Strathmoor is a former suburb of Louisville, Kentucky. It has since splintered into the cities of:

- Kingsley, Kentucky
- Strathmoor Manor, Kentucky
- Strathmoor Village, Kentucky
