= Kinkeadtown =

Coordinates: 38°02′55″N 84°29′09″W

Kinkeadtown is a historically African American section of Lexington, Kentucky. It was established near the home of George Blackburn Kinkead (former Secretary of State of Kentucky), several years after the American Civil War. The land was subdivided by Kinkead in 1870 and sold exclusively to African Americans. In 1880 it was populated by about 20 families and grew to include over 300 residents. Cities had growing populations of African Americans during the era. Kinkead's home is now the Living Arts and Science Center. An archaeological report on the area was published in 1996.

Many of the original homes in Kinkeadtown were destroyed in a redevelopment effort during the 1990s. Lilia Garrison (born 1908), a resident of the area, was interviewed for an oral history project. Mary Edna Berry, another resident, was also interviewed in 1989. Goodloetown was another area of Lexington developed for African Americans and named for the developer, a nephew of Cassius Clay.
