= Speed (disambiguation) =

Speed is the rate of motion, change, or activity.

Speed may also refer to:

== People and fictional characters ==
- Speed (name), a list of people and fictional characters with the surname, given name or nickname
- IShowSpeed or Speed, American YouTuber, streamer, and rapper Darren Watkins Jr. (born 2005)

== Places ==
=== United States ===
- Speed, Indiana
- Speed, Kansas
- Speed, Missouri
- Speed, North Carolina
- Speed, West Virginia

=== Elsewhere ===
- Speed, Victoria, Australia
- Speed River, Canada

== Arts and entertainment ==
=== Amusement rides ===
- Speed (ride), a pendulum fair ride
- Speed: No Limits, a roller coaster at Oakwood Theme Park in Wales
- Speed – The Ride, a roller coaster formerly at the Sahara Hotel and Casino in Las Vegas

=== Film and television ===
- Speed (serial), a 1922 film serial directed by George B. Seitz
- Speed (1925 film), an American film starring Betty Blythe
- Speed (1936 film), an American film starring James Stewart
- Speed (1983 film), a Soviet film directed by Dmitry Svetozarov
- Speed (1984 film), an IMAX documentary
- Speed (1994 film), an American film starring Keanu Reeves and Sandra Bullock
  - Speed 2: Cruise Control, a 1997 sequel to the 1994 film
- Speed (2007 film), an Indian film starring Zayed Khan and Urmila Matondkar
- Speed (2015 film), a South Korean film written and directed by Lee Sang-woo
- Rafta Rafta – The Speed, a 2006 Indian film
- Speed (Australian TV network), a defunct motorsport network
- Speed (TV network), a defunct American motorsports and automobiles channel
- Speed (TV series), a 2001 British series about fast vehicles

=== Music ===
- Speed metal or "speed", a subgenre of heavy metal music
- Speedcore or "speed", a subgenre of hardcore techno
- Speed (Australian band), an Australian hardcore punk band, formed in 2019
- Speed (Japanese band), a female vocal/dance group
- Speed (South Korean band), a group created from members of Coed School
- "Speed" (Billy Idol song), 1994
- "Speed" (Buck-Tick song), 1991
- "Speed" (Montgomery Gentry song), 2002
- "Speed" (Zazie song), 2018
- "Speed", a song by Bond from Shine, 2002

=== Other arts and entertainment ===
- Speed Art Museum, Louisville, Kentucky
- Speed (card game), a shedding game
- Speed (character), a fictional superhero
- Speed (novel), a 1970 novel by William S. Burroughs Jr.

== Other uses ==
- Slang for amphetamine, substituted amphetamine, and related compounds
- Speed (finance), a quantity in quantitative finance
- J. B. Speed School of Engineering, formerly Speed Scientific School, at the University of Louisville
- Lens speed, the maximum aperture or light-gathering ability of an optical system
- Transmission (mechanics), a gear or sprocket configuration
