= Stites & Harbison =

- Headquarters: Southeast
- Major practice areas: General practice
- Date founded: 1832
- Founder: Henry Pirtle
- Company type: PLLC
- Website: www.stites.com

Stites & Harbison is a law practice with offices in Louisville, Lexington, Covington and Frankfort, Kentucky; Jeffersonville, Indiana; Nashville, Memphis and Franklin, Tennessee; Atlanta, Georgia; and Alexandria, Virginia. U.S. News & World Report and Best Lawyers listed Stites & Harbison among America's Top 25 Law Firms in construction litigation.

== History ==
Stites & Harbison was founded in 1832 by a former circuit court judge, Henry Pirtle, in Louisville, Kentucky. James Speed was an early member of the law firm.
