= James Breckenridge Speed =

American entrepreneur and philanthropist (1844–1912)

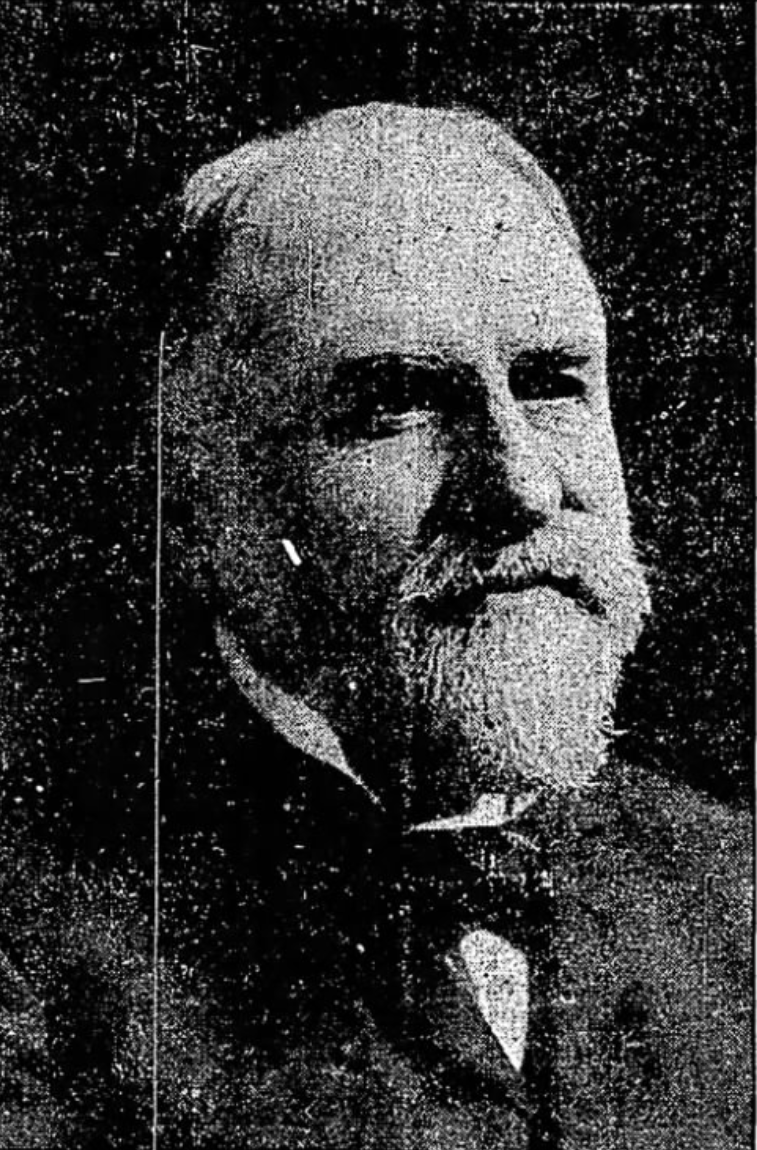
- Portrait of Speed
- Born: January 4, 1844; Boonville, Missouri, U.S.
- Died: July 7, 1912 (aged 68); Rockland, Maine, U.S.
- Resting place: Cave Hill Cemetery; Louisville, Kentucky, U.S.
- Spouse: Hattie Bishop
- Children: 2
- Relatives: James Speed (uncle); John Speed (grandfather)
- Military career
- Allegiance: United States
- Branch: Union Army
- Units: 1st Ohio Battery; 27th Kentucky Infantry Regiment
- Conflicts: American Civil War

James Breckenridge Speed (alternatively James Breckinridge Speed; January 4, 1844 – July 7, 1912) was an American corporate executive, entrepreneur, and philanthropist based in Louisville, Kentucky. He served as the President of the Louisville Railway Company and over the course of his life founded and led multiple public companies including the Louisville Cement Company and the Ohio Valley Telephone Company.

== Early life and family ==
James Breckinridge Speed was born on January 4, 1844, in Boonville, Missouri, to Marry Ellen (née Shallcross) and William Pope Speed, son of John Speed. His mother died when he was an infant. He came to Louisville as an 11-year-old, James B. Speed was raised there by aunt Lucy Fry Speed, thus always considered a Louisvillian. His parents and siblings were all born in Louisville, and his family was the influential Speed family, which had had a great impact on the city. His uncle, also a James Speed, was United States Attorney General in Abraham Lincoln second term Cabinet and for a short time Andrew Johnson's.

Speed attended local schools in Louisville and graduated from the Louisville High School.

== Career ==
Speed was a clerk at the banking house of A. C. and O. F. Badger. He then moved to Chicago and worked in the office of Badger & Co. Speed enlisted with the 1st Ohio Battery and was later made adjutant of the 27th Kentucky Infantry Regiment under Colonel Pennypacker. He was engaged in the battles in Atlanta and Knoxville. He left service in the spring of 1865.

Shortly after the war, Speed left Chicago. Speed was a financial leader who strongly influenced Louisville's development. He helped to establish Louisville's street railway system and became the president of the Louisville Railway Company. He saw early how significant cement would be in the growth of America, and he became the president of the Louisville Cement Company. He developed and operated large coal interests, and served as president of the Ohio Valley Telephone Company. Speed served as president of Louisville's Woolen Mills Company from 1898 until he resigned in 1903. He also served as president of Louisville Cotton Mills Company for about six years and then served as vice president until his death.

== Philanthropy ==
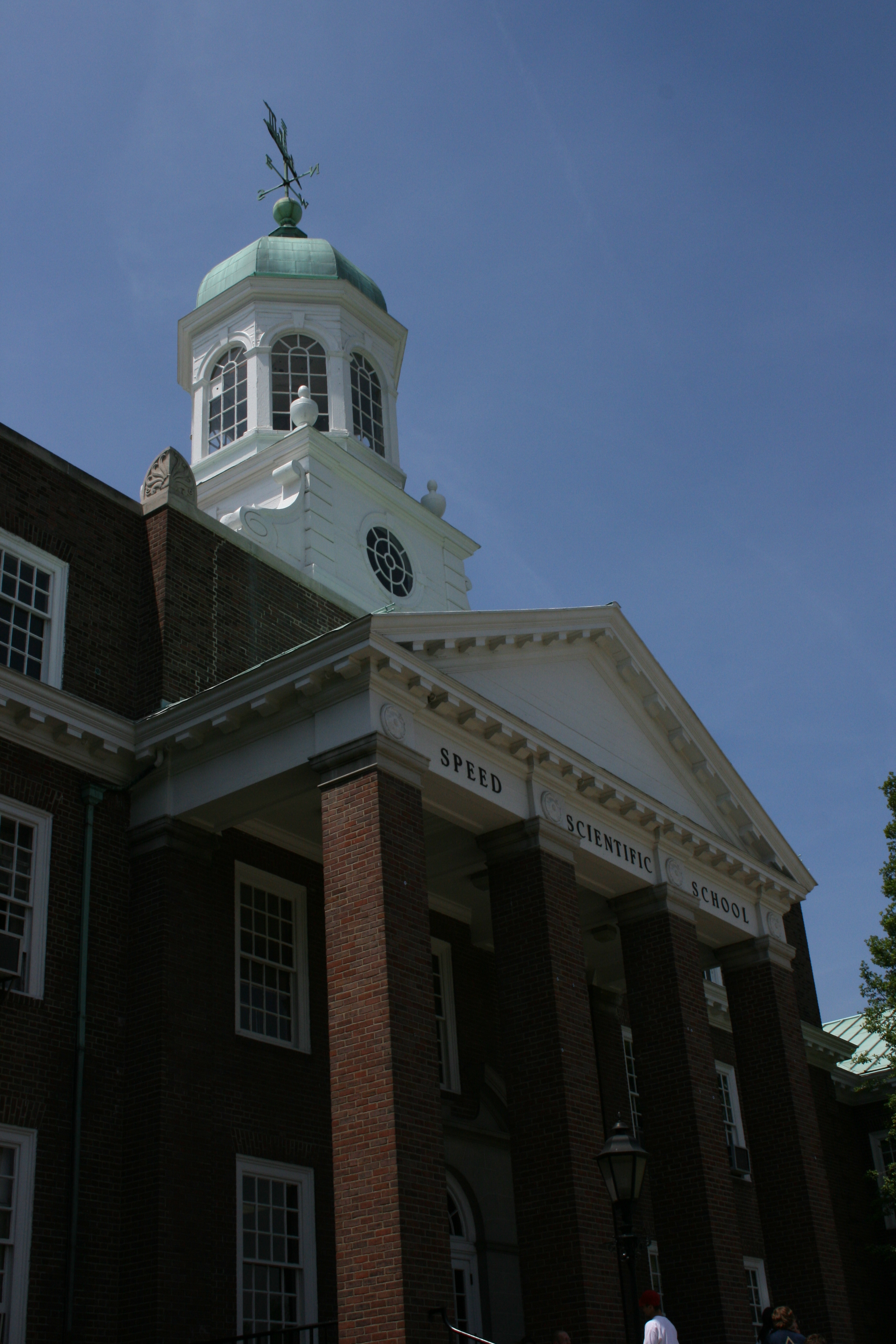
The J.B. Speed building at the Speed School of Engineering

As a philanthropist, he donated a statue of Abraham Lincoln, which stands in the State Capitol, and he helped to establish and maintain several schools. After his death, his wife, Hattie Bishop and his children William S. Speed and Olive Speed Sackett, set up a foundation in his name which helped to found the Speed Art Museum and the J. B. Speed School of Engineering of the University of Louisville.

== Death ==
After suffering from Bright's disease (modern-day nephritis) for years and experiencing heart issues, Speed died on July 7, 1912, at Hotel Samoset in Rockland, Maine, where he spent his summers. He was buried in Cave Hill Cemetery in Louisville.
