= Thomas Speed (politician) =

American politician (1768–1842)

Member of the Kentucky House of Representatives
- In office 1821, 1822, 1840

Member of the U.S. House of Representatives from Kentucky's 10th district
- In office March 4, 1817 – March 3, 1819

Personal details
- Born: October 25, 1768 Charlotte County, Virginia, British America
- Died: February 20, 1842 (aged 73) near Bardstown, Kentucky, U.S.
- Resting place: Bardstown, Kentucky, U.S.
- Party: Democratic-Republican; Whig
- Relatives: John Speed (brother)
- Occupation: Politician; farmer; clerk; writer

Thomas Speed (October 25, 1768 – February 20, 1842) was a U.S. representative from Kentucky and a member of the Kentucky House of Representatives.

== Biography ==
Born in Charlotte County, Virginia, Speed was taught by his father, Captain James Speed. He moved with his parents to Kentucky in 1782. He was employed in the office of the clerk of the General Court. In 1790, he engaged in mercantile pursuits at Danville and Bardstown. He also engaged in agricultural pursuits. He served as clerk of the Bullitt and Nelson circuit courts. He served as a major of Volunteers during the War of 1812.

Speed was elected as a Democratic-Republican to the Fifteenth Congress (March 4, 1817 – March 3, 1819). He was an unsuccessful candidate for reelection. Afterwards, he resumed agricultural pursuits. He also contributed articles to the National Intelligencer of Washington, D.C.

He served as a member of the Kentucky House of Representatives in 1821, 1822, and again in 1840. He was a member of the Whig Party when it was organized.

His brother was John Speed. Thomas Speed died on his farm, "Cottage Grove", near Bardstown, Kentucky, on February 20, 1842, and was interred there.

U.S. House of Representatives
Preceded by Benjamin Hardin	Member of the U.S. House of Representatives from Kentucky's 10th congressional district March 4, 1817 – March 3, 1819	Succeeded by Benjamin Hardin
