= Benjamin Hardin =

American politician (1784–1852)

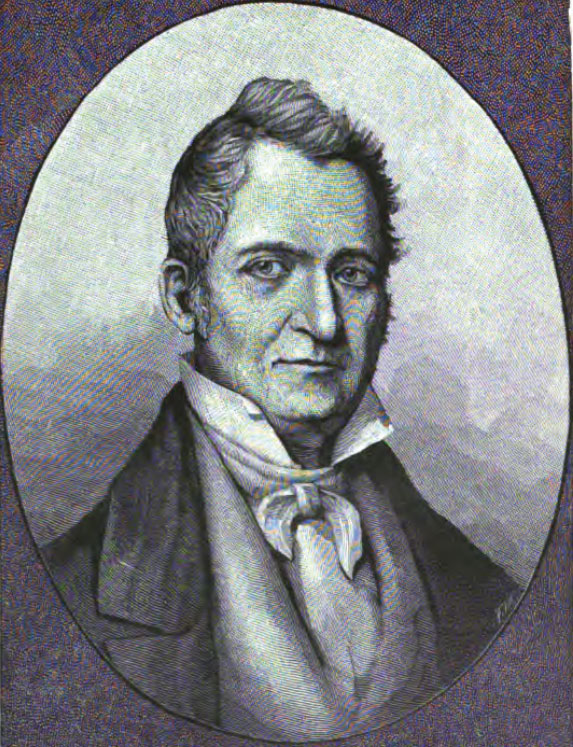

27th Secretary of State of Kentucky
- In office September 4, 1844 – September 6, 1848
- Governor: William Owsley
- Preceded by: James Harlan
- Succeeded by: George B. Kinkead

Member of the U.S. House of Representatives from Kentucky
- In office March 4, 1815 – March 4, 1817
- Preceded by: William Pope Duval
- Succeeded by: Thomas Speed
- Constituency: 10th district
- In office March 4, 1819 – March 4, 1823
- Preceded by: Thomas Speed
- Succeeded by: Francis Johnson
- Constituency: 10th district
- In office March 4, 1833 – March 4, 1837
- Preceded by: John Adair
- Succeeded by: John Pope
- Constituency: 7th district

Member of the Kentucky House of Representatives
- In office 1828–1832

Member of the Kentucky Senate
- In office 1810–1811; 1824–1825

Personal details
- Born: February 29, 1784 Westmoreland County, Pennsylvania, US
- Died: September 24, 1852 (aged 68) Bardstown, Kentucky, US
- Party: Democratic-Republican; National Republican
- Relations: Father-in-law of John L. Helm; Cousin of Martin Davis Hardin; Cousin of Charles A. Wickliffe
- Profession: Lawyer

Benjamin Hardin (February 29, 1784 – September 24, 1852) was an American politician who was a United States representative from Kentucky. Martin Davis Hardin was his cousin.

== Biography ==
Hardin was born at the Georges Creek settlement on the Monongahela River, Westmoreland County, Pennsylvania and then moved with his parents to Washington County, Kentucky in 1788. He attended the schools of Nelson and Washington Counties, Kentucky before studying law. Admitted to the bar in 1806, he commenced practice in Elizabethtown and Bardstown, Nelson County, Kentucky, and then settled in Bardstown, Kentucky in 1808. He owned slaves.

Hardin was a member of the Kentucky House of Representatives in 1810, 1811, 1824, and 1825 and served in the Kentucky Senate 1828–1832. He was elected as a Republican to the Fourteenth Congress (March 4, 1815 – March 3, 1817) and reelected as a Republican to the Sixteenth and Seventeenth Congresses (March 4, 1819 – March 3, 1823). He was elected as an Anti-Jacksonian to the Twenty-third and Twenty-fourth Congresses (March 4, 1833 – March 3, 1837).

After leaving Congress, Hardin served as the Secretary of State of Kentucky 1844–1847. He served as a member of the Kentucky constitutional convention in 1849.

== Death and interment ==
Hardin died in Bardstown, Kentucky in 1852 and was buried in the family burying ground near Springfield, Kentucky.

U.S. House of Representatives
Preceded by William Pope Duval	Member of the U.S. House of Representatives from Kentucky's 10th congressional district 1815-1817	Succeeded by Thomas Speed
Preceded by Thomas Speed	Member of the U.S. House of Representatives from Kentucky's 10th congressional district 1819-1823	Succeeded by Francis Johnson
Preceded by John Adair	Member of the U.S. House of Representatives from Kentucky's 7th congressional district 1833-1837	Succeeded by John Pope
Political offices
Preceded by James Harlan	Secretary of State of Kentucky; 1844–1848	Succeeded by George B. Kinkead
