= Hattie Bishop Speed =

American philanthropist (1858–1942)

- Born: Harriett Theresa Bishop; February 12, 1858; Louisville, Kentucky, U.S.
- Died: August 8, 1942 (aged 84); Louisville, Kentucky, U.S.
- Resting place: Cave Hill Cemetery; Louisville, Kentucky, U.S.
- Occupations: Pianist; philanthropist
- Spouse: James Breckinridge Speed (m. 1906)

Hattie Bishop Speed (February 12, 1858 – August 8, 1942) was a pianist, humanist, and philanthropist who championed music and the arts in Louisville, Kentucky.

== Early life ==
Harriett Theresa Bishop was born on February 12, 1858, in Louisville, Kentucky. Hattie attended Louisville and Boston private schools before going to Europe in 1886. Her music education continued for six years there in Berlin and Rome at the age of 28.

== Career ==
Upon returning to Louisville, Ms. Bishop resumed her life as a piano teacher and performer. As a music student in Rome in the late 1880s and early 1890s, Hattie Bishop became close friends with Anita Vedder, daughter of the American expatriate painter, Elihu Vedder. After visiting the Vedders at their homes in Rome and on the island of Capri, Hattie came to know American painters, Charles Caryl Coleman and George Randolph Barse.

Mrs. Speed. was also a fervent advocate of Louisville's American Red Cross Hospital, which had been founded by African-American physicians and operating the only nurse training program in Kentucky open to black women. Hattie Speed served on the hospital's advisory board and helped fund many of the hospital's operations.

== Personal life and philanthropy ==
Hattie Bishop married prominent Louisville businessman, James Breckinridge Speed, in 1906. She was 48 and he was 62. His first wife, Cora Coffin Speed, had died the year prior. Traveling extensively throughout the US as well as abroad, the two enjoyed collecting paintings and sculptures.

With James Speed's death in 1912, Hattie established the Speed Art Museum to memorialize of her husband of his love of art. Mrs. Speed served as the first president and director of the art museum.

== Death ==
Hattie Speed died on August 8, 1942, in Louisville. She was buried at Cave Hill Cemetery in Louisville.
