= Lewis Gannett =

American writer

Lewis Alan Gannett (born 1952) is an American writer. He is the author of two novels, The Living One (1993) and Magazine Beach (1996). He edited the late C.A. Tripp's The Intimate World of Abraham Lincoln (2005), a controversial study of Lincoln's sexuality, and published related scholarship in The Journal of the Abraham Lincoln Association.

Gannett is a grandson of Lewis Stiles Gannett, longtime book reviewer for the New York Herald Tribune.

== Bibliography ==
- Gannett, Lewis A. (1993). The Living One. Random House. ISBN 978-0679410805.
- Gannett, Lewis A. (1996). Magazine Beach. HarperCollins. ISBN 978-0061052354.
- Gannett, Lewis A. (2005). "'Overwhelming Evidence' of a Lincoln-Ann Rutledge Romance?: Reexamining Rutledge Family Reminiscences". Journal of the Abraham Lincoln Association. 26 (1).
- Gannett, Lewis A. (2010). "The Ann Rutledge Story: Case Closed?". Journal of the Abraham Lincoln Association. 31 (2).
- Tripp, C.A. (2005). The Intimate World of Abraham Lincoln. Free Press. ISBN 0-7432-6639-0.
