= George B. Kinkead =

American politician

28th Secretary of State of Kentucky
- In office September 1, 1846 – April 7, 1847
- Governor: William Owsley
- Preceded by: Benjamin Hardin
- Succeeded by: William Decatur Reed

Personal details
- Born: September 25, 1811 Woodford County, Kentucky
- Died: November 11, 1877 (aged 66) Lexington, Kentucky
- Party: Whig Party, Democratic Party
- Spouse: Eliza Anderson Pearce (m. 1846)
- Relations: John (father), Margaret née Blackburn (mother)
- Children: 14
- Education: Transylvania University
- Profession: Lawyer

George Blackburn Kinkead (September 25, 1811 – November 11, 1877), was an American lawyer, who served as Secretary of State of Kentucky (1846–47).

== Early life and education ==
Kinkead was born September 25, 1811, in Cane Springs, Woodford County, Kentucky, the son of John and Margaret née Blackburn.

He studied law at Transylvania University, graduating in 1830. He established his own practice in 1833, in partnership with Garret Davis.

== Career ==
In 1838 he was appointed the Commonwealth’s Attorney for Frankfort by Governor James Clark. In 1846 he was appointed as the Secretary of State by Governor William Owsley, replacing the incumbent, Benjamin Hardin. Hardin however contested his removal, refusing to resign until his position was vindicated.

Kinkead supported slavery and the colonization of former slaves to Africa but was opposed to secession.

On 21 December 1846 he married Eliza Anderson née Pearce (the daughter of James Pearce, who married the niece of General George Rogers Clark) at the St. Paul's Episcopal Church in Louisville, they had fourteen children, including Robert Standard (b.1847), John (b.1848), Ellen Talbot (b.1850), Anne Pearce (b.1852), James Pearce (b.1854), Henry Pindell (b.1855), Margaret Blackburn (b.1857), William Bury (b.1859), Mary Bullock (b.1860), Frank (b.1861), Churchill Blackburn (b.1863), Jacqueline (b.1865), Jimmie (b.1865) and Eliza Pearce (b.1868).

In March 1850 Kinkead replaced Ninian Edwards as attorney for Abraham Lincoln and his wife, Mary. He successfully represented Lincoln in 1855, in a legal dispute before the American Civil War, where Lincoln was alleged to have collected fees for another firm and never conveyed them.

Kinkead died on November 11, 1877, in Lexington, Kentucky. His wife, Eliza, died in 1904.

== See also ==
- Kinkeadtown

Political offices
Preceded by Benjamin Hardin	Secretary of State of Kentucky; 1846–1847	Succeeded by William D. Reed
