= George Randolph Barse =

American painter

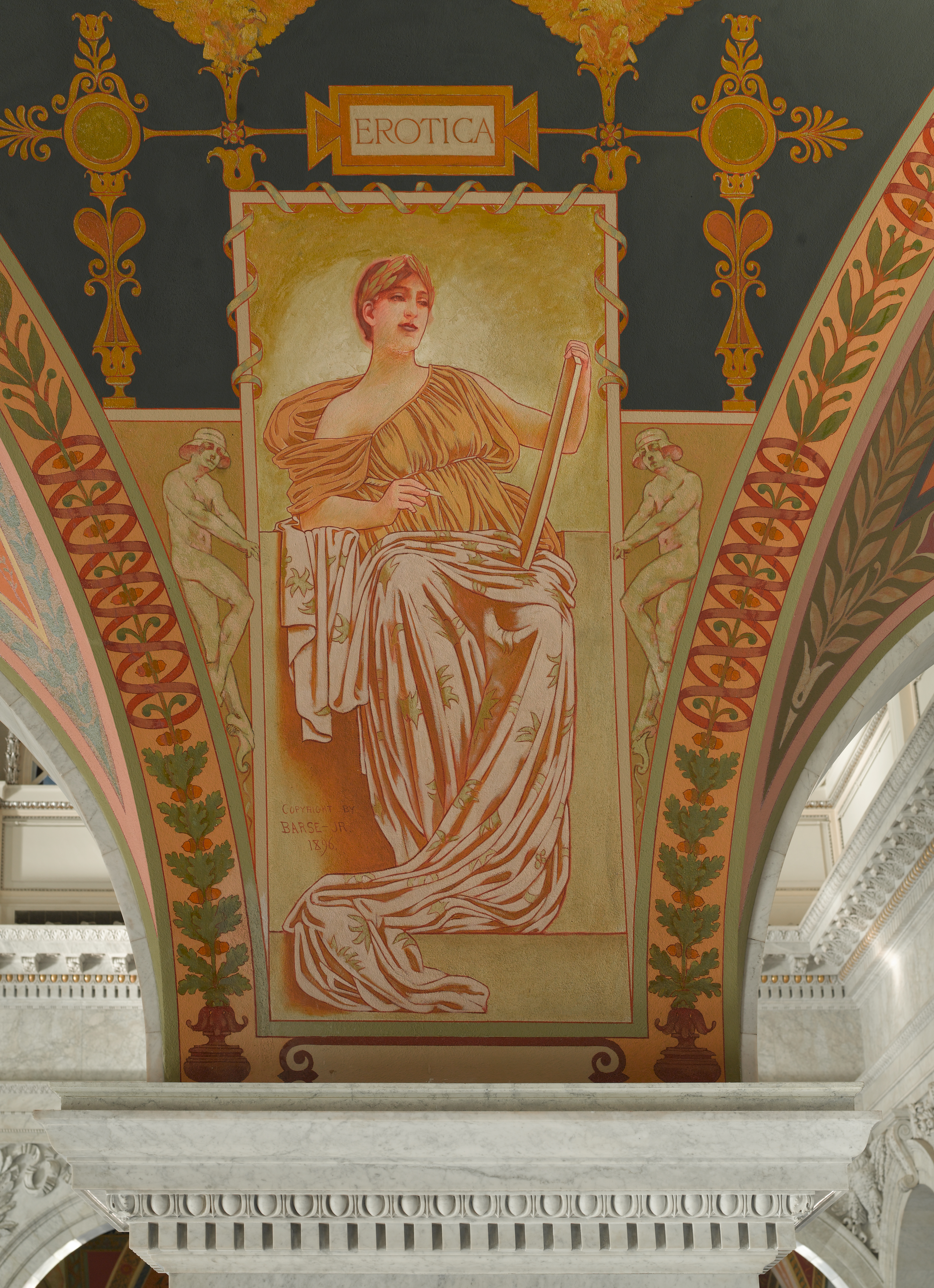
Erotica, Library of Congress

George Randolph Barse Jr. (July 31, 1861 – February 25, 1938) was an American artist and illustrator.

Born in Detroit, Michigan, Barse attended public schools in Kansas City, Missouri and went to Paris in 1878, where he spent five years training at the École nationale supérieure des Beaux-Arts in the atelier of Alexandre Cabanel, and at the Académie Julian under Jules Joseph Lefebvre and Gustave Boulanger.

Barse returned to the United States for a few years, partly in New York and partly in the Texas Panhandle, before returning to Europe in 1889. His six years in Italy included his marriage to Italian model Rosina Ferrara, muse of John Singer Sargent and others, in 1891. They were married until her death from pneumonia in 1934.

In 1895 Barse received his best-known commission, eight allegorical panels for the Library of Congress. That same year, he received the First Hallgarten Prize from the National Academy of Design. He was elected into the National Academy of Design in 1898 as an associate member, and became a full member in 1900. He also taught a class in life drawing at the Art Students League of New York. From 1904 he was based in Katonah, New York.

Barse committed suicide by carbon monoxide poisoning four years after his wife's death. As a result of his friendship with Hattie Bishop Speed, many of his works are held at the Speed Art Museum in Louisville, Kentucky.
