= Kingsley, Kentucky =

- City
- Location of Kingsley in Jefferson County, Kentucky

- Location within the state of Kentucky Kingsley (the United States)
- Coordinates: 38°13′19″N 85°40′22″W
- Country: United States
- State: Kentucky
- County: Jefferson
- Incorporated: 1939

Government
  - Mayor: Thomas Schlindwein
  - Commissioners: Jamie Klein Les Goldring Andy Looney; Dary Picken

Area
  - Total: 0.073 sq mi (0.19 km^{2})
  - Land: 0.073 sq mi (0.19 km^{2})
  - Water: 0 sq mi (0.00 km^{2})
- Elevation: 538 ft (164 m)

Population (2020)
  - Total: 397
  - Density: 5,494/sq mi (2,121.1/km^{2})
- Time zone: UTC-5 (Eastern (EST))
  - Summer (DST): UTC-4 (EDT)
- ZIP code: 40205
- FIPS code: 21-42598
- GNIS feature ID: 2404834
- Website: www.cityofkingsley.org

Kingsley is a home rule-class city in Jefferson County, Kentucky, United States. As of the 2020 census, Kingsley had a population of 397. It is a suburb of Louisville.

== History ==
Many years ago the community was part of Farmington, the once sprawling farm of the Speed family. On March 1, 1924, developer C.C. Hieatt purchased 46.063 acres (186,410 m^{2}) off Taylorsville Road and created the subdivision of Kingsley as an extension of the Strathmoor neighborhood. On December 21, 1939, Kingsley was incorporated as a 6th-class city.

== Geography ==
Kingsley is located 6 miles (10 km) southeast of downtown Louisville on roughly a triangle of land between Taylorsville Road, Tyler Lane, and Byron Avenue. It is bordered to the northwest by Seneca Gardens, to the west by Strathmoor Manor, and to the northeast by Bowman Field Regional Airport.

According to the United States Census Bureau, Kingsley has a total area of 0.07 square miles (0.19 km^{2}), all land.

== Demographics ==
Historical population
Census	Pop.	Note	%±
1940	300		—
1950	488		62.7%
1960	508		4.1%
1970	504		−0.8%
1980	464		−7.9%
1990	399		−14.0%
2000	428		7.3%
2010	381		−11.0%
2020	397		4.2%
U.S. Decennial Census

As of the census of 2000, there were 428 people, 180 households, and 126 families residing in the city. The population density was 5,538.6 inhabitants per square mile (2,138.5/km^{2}). There were 183 housing units at an average density of 2,368.1 per square mile (914.3/km^{2}). The racial makeup of the city was 96.50% White, 0.93% African American, 2.10% Asian, 0.23% Pacific Islander, 0.23% from other races. Hispanic or Latino of any race were 0.47% of the population.

There were 180 households, out of which 27.2% had children under the age of 18 living with them, 57.8% were married couples living together, 7.2% had a female householder with no husband present, and 30.0% were non-families. 25.0% of all households were made up of individuals, and 7.2% had someone living alone who was 65 years of age or older. The average household size was 2.38 and the average family size was 2.88.

In the city, the population was spread out, with 21.7% under the age of 18, 4.4% from 18 to 24, 31.5% from 25 to 44, 27.3% from 45 to 64, and 15.0% who were 65 years of age or older. The median age was 41 years. For every 100 females, there were 88.5 males. For every 100 females age 18 and over, there were 89.3 males.

The median income for a household in the city was $56,111, and the median income for a family was $63,750. Males had a median income of $43,542 versus $36,875 for females. The per capita income for the city was $25,348. About 1.8% of families and 3.4% of the population were below the poverty line, including 2.5% of those under age 18 and 10.4% of those age 65 or over.

== Governance ==
Kingsley contracts an independent police force in cooperation with two other small cities, Strathmoor Village and Strathmoor Manor. The three cities have occasionally discussed merging in order to increase their political clout within Louisville Metro.

The Tree Board was established after it was noted that many of the older trees were dying or in poor health. In 2003, the National Arbor Day Foundation approved the application for the city to receive formal status as a Tree City USA. Many new trees have been planted in residents' front yards and Kingsley Green Park because of grants.
