= Speed Art Museum =

Art museum in Louisville, Kentucky

- Speed Art Museum, March 2016
- Established: 1927
- Location: 2035 South 3rd Street; Louisville, Kentucky 40208
- Coordinates: 38°13′4.3″N 85°45′39.3″W
- Type: Art
- Website: speedmuseum.org

The Speed Art Museum, originally the J.B. Speed Memorial Museum and colloquially the Speed, is an art museum in Louisville, Kentucky, United States. Established in 1927, it is the oldest and largest art museum in the state of Kentucky. It is located on South Third Street in Louisville, adjacent to the main campus of the University of Louisville. As of 2016, it received around 180,000 visits annually.

The museum offers a variety of "art experiences" outside its collection and international exhibitions, including the Community Days, Family Days, the Art Sparks Interactive Family Gallery, and the late-night event After Hours at the Speed.

The Speed houses ancient, classical, modern, and contemporary art from around the world. The focus of the collection is Western art, from antiquity to the present day. In particular, the museum holds significant collections of paintings from the Netherlands, France, and Italy, as well as important contemporary art and American decorative art. The Speed also holds meaningful works on paper and historical and contemporary Native American and African artworks.

== History ==
The original museum building was built in 1927 by Arthur Loomis in the Neoclassical style. Loomis was already well known in Louisville for landmarks like the Louisville Medical College and Levy Brothers. The original building was designed as an understated Beaux-Arts limestone facade. Hattie Bishop Speed established the museum in memory of her husband James Breckenridge Speed, a prominent Louisville businessman, art collector, and philanthropist. Speed set up the endowment to fund the museum, encouraging the museum to never charge admission. The museum became incorporated as a privately endowed institution and established a board of governors in 1933.

In 1928, the centenary of Kentucky portrait painter Matthew Harris Jouett was celebrated with an exhibition of his portraits, many owned by prominent Louisvillians.

The Speed would receive many notable donations in its early years. A large collection of 15th and 16th century French and Italian decorative art was donated by Dr. Preston Pope Satterwhite in 1941. In 1944 a sizeable and valuable collection of Native American artifacts were donated by Dr. Frederick Weygold. In that same year one of the most significant early donations – the English Renaissance room – was donated by Satterwhite. This room was moved in its entirety from Devonshire, England, and required the museum to build an expansion to house it. This expansion, completed in 1954, was the first of three additions added to the original structure. This room is still on display for the public as of 2026.

In 1964, paintings and furniture donated from the collection of Mrs. W. Blakemore Wheeler were put on view, including works by Mary Cassatt, John Constable, Gustave Courbet, Thomas Gainsborough, Paul Gauguin, Pierre-Auguste Renoir, Maurice Utrillo, and James Abbott McNeill Whistler.

In 1973, the north addition of the museum, designed by Brenner, Danforth, and Rockwell of Chicago, opened, giving new space for a theatre, offices, indoor sculpture court, and library.

The Speed celebrated its 50th anniversary in 1977 with the acquisition of Rembrandt's Portrait of a Woman, one of the museum's most significant acquisitions.

In 1983, the south addition, designed by Robert Geddes, dean emeritus of the Princeton University School of Architecture, opened. The new wing added gallery space for permanent collections and special exhibitions.

In 1996, using a master plan by architect Peter Rose, the Speed closed for a year to undertake an extensive renovation. Newer lighting, heating and cooling systems, multi-layered labels about the collection, the Laramie L. Learning Center, and Art Sparks Interactive Family Gallery were put into place. Around the same time, James Breckinridge Speed's granddaughter Alice Speed Stoll died and bequeathed over $50 million to the museum.

In September 2012 the museum began a multi-year $60 million expansion and renovation project, designed by architect Kulapat Yantrasast. During the closure, the museum opened Local Speed, a satellite space in Louisville's East Market District for rotating exhibitions, programs, and events. In March 2016 renovations were complete and the Speed was reopened to the public with a celebration in which the Speed stayed open for 30 consecutive hours and hosted a variety of performances, tours and activities. The 62,500-square-foot North Building doubled the overall square footage and nearly tripled the gallery space from the previous wing. The expansion created a space for larger special exhibitions, new contemporary art galleries, a family education welcome center, a 150-seat cinema, indoor/outdoor café, museum shop, and a multi-functional pavilion for performances, lectures and entertainment.

In October 2025 an additional public outdoor space around the museum, the Elizabeth P. and Frederick K. Cressman Art Park, was completed. The project cost $22 million and was designed by Reed Hilderbrand. This space includes contemporary sculptures, native landscaping and added 150 new trees to the museum grounds.

== Collection ==
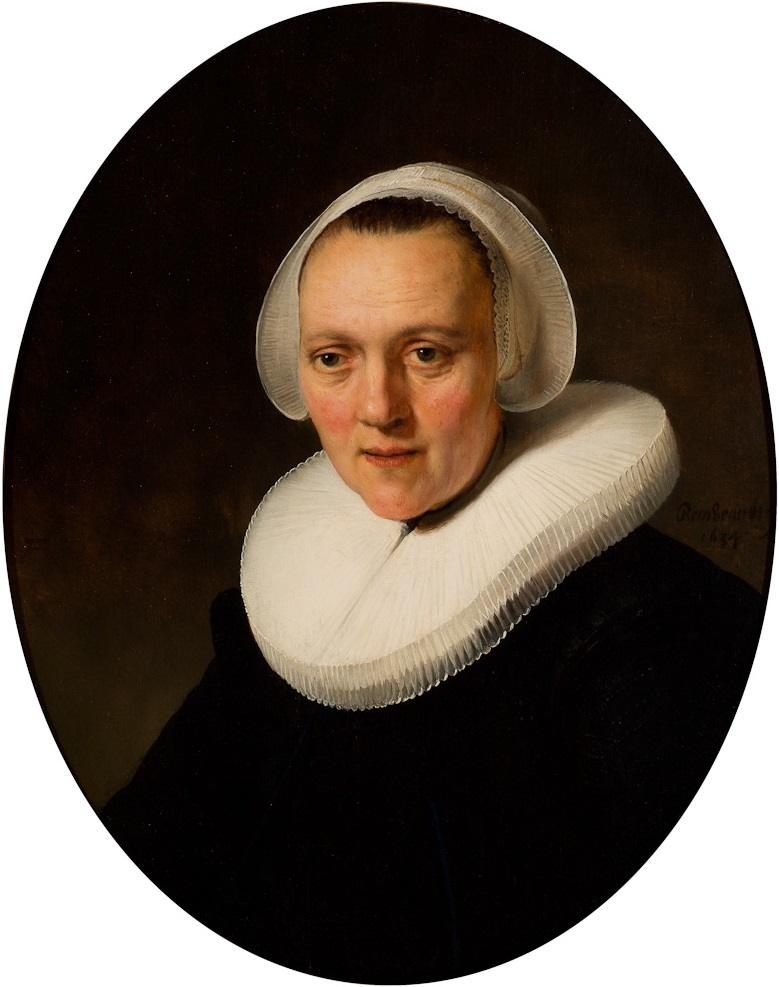
Rembrandt van Rijn, Portrait of a Forty-Year-Old Woman, possibly Marretje Cornelisdr. van Grotewal, 1634

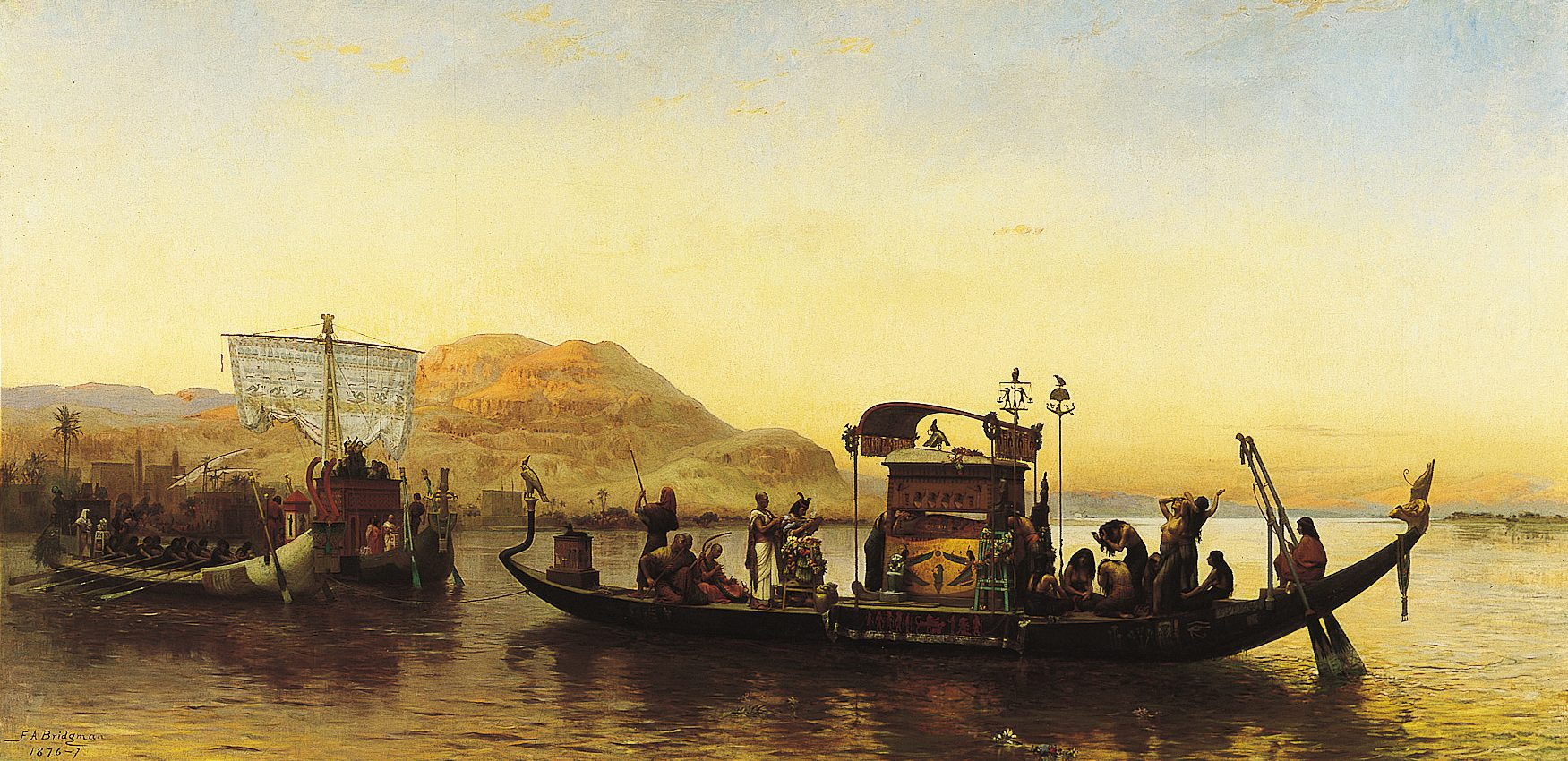
Frederick Arthur Bridgman, Funeral of a Mummy on the Nile, 1877

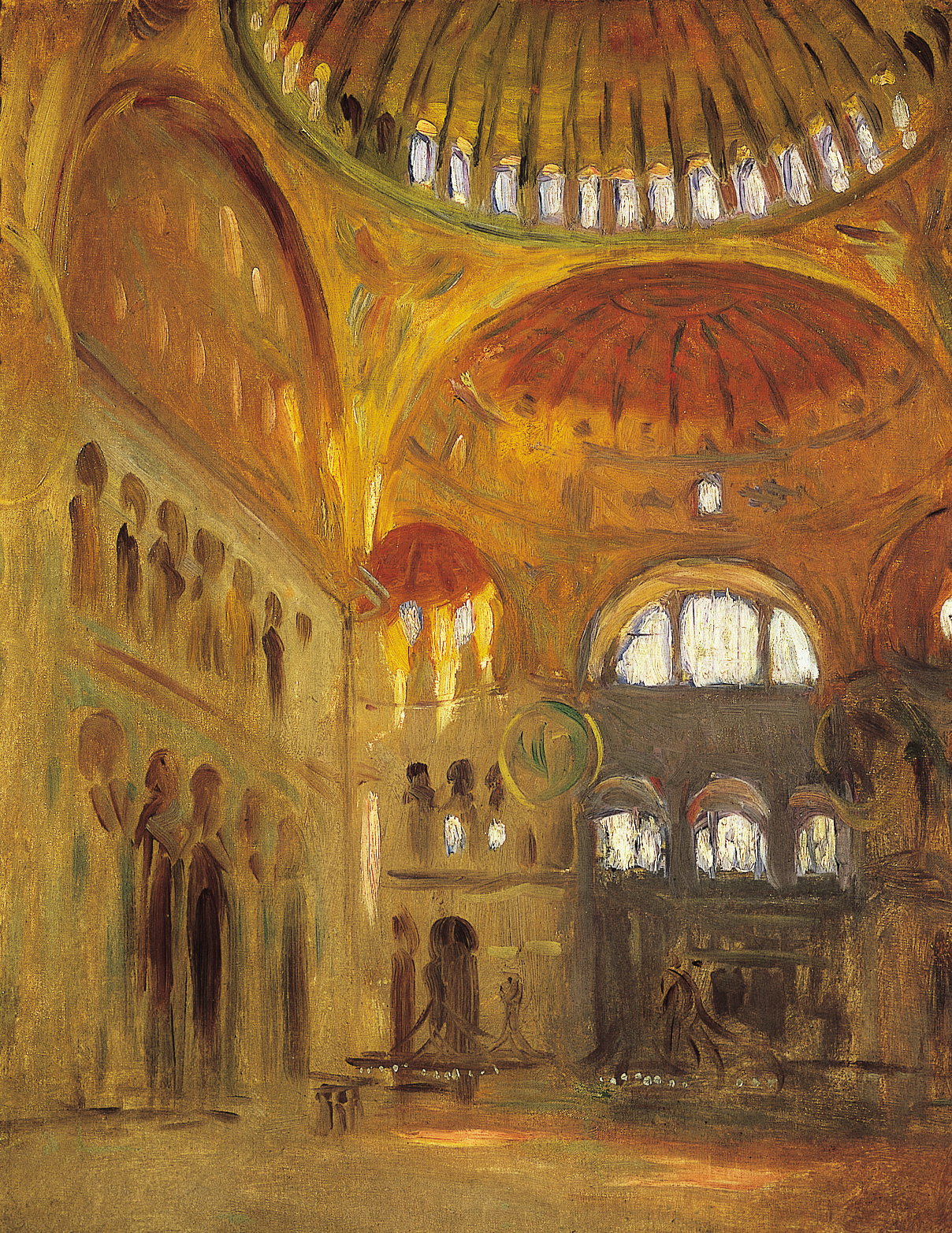
John Singer Sargent, Interior of the Hagia Sophia, 1891

The Speed houses a collection of African art, ancient art, Native American art, American art, European art, and contemporary art.

Highlights of the collection include works by:

European painting and sculpture

- Giambattista Pittoni
- Rembrandt
- Peter Paul Rubens
- Claude Monet
- James Tissot
- Jacob Isaakszoon van Ruisdael
- Gustave Courbet
- Auguste Rodin
- Thomas Gainsborough
- Gaspar de Crayer

Modernism

- Constantin Brâncuși
- Marc Chagall
- Pablo Picasso
- Jean Arp
- Jean Dubuffet
- Paul Cézanne
- Henri Matisse
- Paul Klee

American painting and sculpture

- Benjamin West
- James Peale
- Elihu Vedder
- John Singer Sargent
- Frederick Arthur Bridgman
- Mary Cassatt
- Edward Redfield
- Childe Hassam
- Hiram Powers
- Franklin Simmons
- Randolph Rogers
- Thomas Ball
- Augustus Saint-Gaudens
- George Grey Barnard
- Paul Manship
- George Randolph Barse
- Paul Sawyier

Contemporary art

- Ghada Amer
- Janine Antoni
- John Chamberlain
- Sam Gilliam
- Barbara Kruger
- Sol LeWitt
- Alice Neel
- Yinka Shonibare
- Lorna Simpson
- Kiki Smith
- Frank Stella
- Tavares Strachan
- Richard Tuttle
- Nari Ward
- Carrie Mae Weems

== Directors ==
- Hattie Bishop Speed (1925–1942), the museum's first president and director
- Paul S. Harris (1946–1962), the museum's first professional director
- Addison Franklin Page (1962–1984)
- Jesse (Jay) G. Wright Jr. (1984–1985)
- Peter Morrin (1986–2005)
- Charles L. Venable (2007–2012)
- Ghislain d'Humières (2013–2017)
- Stephen Reily (2017–2021)
- Raphaela Platow (2021–2025)
- Kathleen V. Jameson (2026–present)

== See also ==
- List of attractions and events in the Louisville metropolitan area
- List of museums in the Louisville metropolitan area
