= Strathmoor Manor, Kentucky =

- City
- Location of Strathmoor Manor in Jefferson County, Kentucky

- Location within the state of Kentucky Strathmoor Manor (the United States)
- Coordinates: 38°13′08″N 85°41′01″W
- Country: United States
- State: Kentucky
- County: Jefferson
- Incorporated: May 6, 1931
- Named after: an earlier suburb

Government
  - Type: Mayor - City Commission
  - Mayor: Dennis Boyd

Area
  - Total: 0.058 sq mi (0.15 km^{2})
  - Land: 0.058 sq mi (0.15 km^{2})
  - Water: 0 sq mi (0.00 km^{2})
- Elevation: 545 ft (166 m)

Population (2020)
  - Total: 351
  - Density: 6,175.8/sq mi (2,384.48/km^{2})
- Time zone: UTC-5 (Eastern (EST))
  - Summer (DST): UTC-4 (EDT)
- ZIP Code: 40205
- Area code: 502
- FIPS code: 21-74064
- GNIS feature ID: 2405532
- Website: City of Strathmoor Manor

Strathmoor Manor is a home rule-class city in Jefferson County, Kentucky, United States. As of the 2020 census, Strathmoor Manor had a population of 351.

The city is characterized by tree-lined streets and wide setbacks.

== Geography ==
Strathmoor Manor is located in central Jefferson County. It is bordered to the northeast by Strathmoor Village and on all other sides by Louisville. U.S. Route 150 (Bardstown Road) forms the northeast border of the community. It is 5 miles (8 km) southeast of downtown Louisville.

According to the United States Census Bureau, Strathmoor Manor has a total area of 0.06 square miles (0.15 km^{2}), all land.

== History ==
Along with Strathmoor Village and Kingsley, Strathmoor Manor represents part of the earlier Louisville suburb of Strathmoor.

Much of Strathmoor Manor was developed by Clarence C. Hieatt, who constructed over 70 subdivisions in Louisville in sixty years as a developer. It was developed gradually from 1921 to 1925 and incorporated as a city in 1931.

== Government ==
Strathmoor Manor has a mayor-commission form of government. In addition to the elected mayor there are four elected city commissioners. The mayor and four commissioners together comprise the city commission.

== Demographics ==
Historical population
Census	Pop.	Note	%±
1940	375		—
1950	422		12.5%
1960	434		2.8%
1970	464		6.9%
1980	368		−20.7%
1990	391		6.3%
2000	333		−14.8%
2010	337		1.2%
2020	351		4.2%
U.S. Decennial Census

As of the census of 2000, there were 333 people, 141 households, and 90 families residing in the city. The population density was 6,702.4 inhabitants per square mile (2,587.8/km^{2}). There were 129 housing units at an average density of 2,596.4 per square mile (1,002.5/km^{2}). The racial makeup of the city was 98.20% White, 0.90% Asian, 0.60% from other races, and 0.30% from two or more races. Hispanic or Latino of any race were 0.90% of the population.

There were 129 households, out of which 39.5% had children under the age of 18 living with them, 58.9% were married couples living together, 10.1% had a female householder with no husband present, and 29.5% were non-families. 24.0% of all households were made up of individuals, and 13.2% had someone living alone who was 65 years of age or older. The average household size was 2.58 and the average family size was 3.13.

In the city, the population was spread out, with 28.8% under the age of 18, 3.3% from 18 to 24, 29.1% from 25 to 44, 25.5% from 45 to 64, and 13.2% who were 65 years of age or older. The median age was 37 years. For every 100 females, there were 100.6 males. For every 100 females age 18 and over, there were 82.3 males.

The median income for a household in the city was $80,764, and the median income for a family was $88,682. Males had a median income of $60,139 versus $46,591 for females. The per capita income for the city was $30,171. None of the population or families were below the poverty line.
