= Goodloetown =

Residential area in Lexington, Kentucky, US

Coordinates: 38°03′N 84°29′W

Goodlowtown is a historically African American section of Lexington, Kentucky. It was named for William Cassius Goodloe.

It is located in a bottomland area.

Horse jockey Isaac Burns Murphy was a resident.
