= Clarence Arthur Tripp =

American psychologist (1919–2003)

Clarence Arthur Tripp Jr. (1919–2003) was an American psychologist, writer, and researcher for Alfred Kinsey.

Born on October 4, 1919, in Denton, Texas, and attended Corsicana High School in May 1938. He studied at the New York Institute of Photography in New York City and in 1940, he became a member of the Society of Motion Picture Engineers. He also studied photography at the Eastman School of Photography, Rochester Athenaeum and Mechanics Institute (now Rochester Institute of Technology). He graduated from Rochester Athenaeum and Mechanics Institute in 1941 where he majored in commercial photography. He served in the United States Navy. In February 1943, he took a job at 20th Century Fox in New York City.

Tripp worked with Kinsey at the Kinsey Institute for Research in Sex, Gender and Reproduction in Bloomington, Indiana, from 1948 to 1956. He earned a PhD in Clinical psychology from New York University. Tripp drew attention with a book, published posthumously, wherein he made the case that Abraham Lincoln had several same-sex relationships.

== Works ==
- The Homosexual Matrix (ISBN 0-07-065201-5)
- The Intimate World of Abraham Lincoln (ISBN 0-7432-6639-0)
