= Thomas Balcerski =

American historian and writer (born 1982)

Thomas J. Balcerski
- Born: Thomas J. Balcerski; July 9, 1982 (age 44); Ridgewood, New Jersey, U.S.
- Education: Cornell University (BA, PhD); Stony Brook University (MA)
- Occupations: Historian, Author, Professor
- Writing career
- Subjects: American History, Political History, LGBTQ History

Thomas J. Balcerski (born 1982) is an American historian, author, and professor of history at Eastern Connecticut State University. Balcerski was named the systemwide recipient of the Connecticut State Colleges and Universities Faculty Research Award for 2020–21. He is the author of Bosom Friends: The Intimate World of James Buchanan and William Rufus King (2019).

== Early life and education ==
Balcerski graduated Magna Cum Laude from Cornell University in 2005 with a B.A. in American Studies and Economics. As an undergraduate, he was an active member of the Acacia (fraternity), where he served as Venerable Dean, and received the Award of Merit for his book Acacia Fraternity at Cornell: The First Century. The co-creator of the popular course “AMST 2001: The First American University,” he was also named Historian of the Cornell University Class of 2005. He went on to receive an M.A. in history from the State University of New York at Stony Brook in 2008 and later a PhD of history from Cornell University in 2014.

== Career ==
His work started to break into the mainstream media in 2019. He was featured in the Discovery+ series “The Book of Queer,” where he was interviewed about President Abraham Lincoln, the National Geographic mini-series Rewind the 90s (2023), and the independent film Lover of Men: The Untold History of Abraham Lincoln (2024). Balcerski has also appeared on and written for numerous media outlets including The Washington Post, Smithsonian (magazine), and multiple pieces for CNN.

=== Bosom Friends ===
Balcerski's first book Bosom Friends: The Intimate World of James Buchanan and William Rufus King evaluates the potential sexual relationship between James Buchanan and William Rufus King. In the book Balcerski focuses on “the significance of male friendships” within the political spheres and personal lives of the antebellum period along with the complexities of political conservatism and the importance of unifying alliances for maintaining Democratic power in the antebellum period. Bosom Friends won the 2019 Best LGBTQ Biography from The Advocate (LGBT magazine). The book had a positive reception, with the National Review stating “[Bosom Friends] provides a useful understanding of the way personal networks and informal groups, such as messes, ran Washington in the mid 19th century,” and the American Historical Review writing that “Balcerski impressively balances the personal and the worldly to produce an original and engaging study both of two men and of the wider antebellum world which they lived in and helped shape.”

== Awards ==
- 2022 Ray Allen Billington Visiting Professor in U.S. History at Occidental College and a Long-Term Fellow at The Huntington.
