= Joshua Fry Speed =

American planter and businessman (1814–1882)

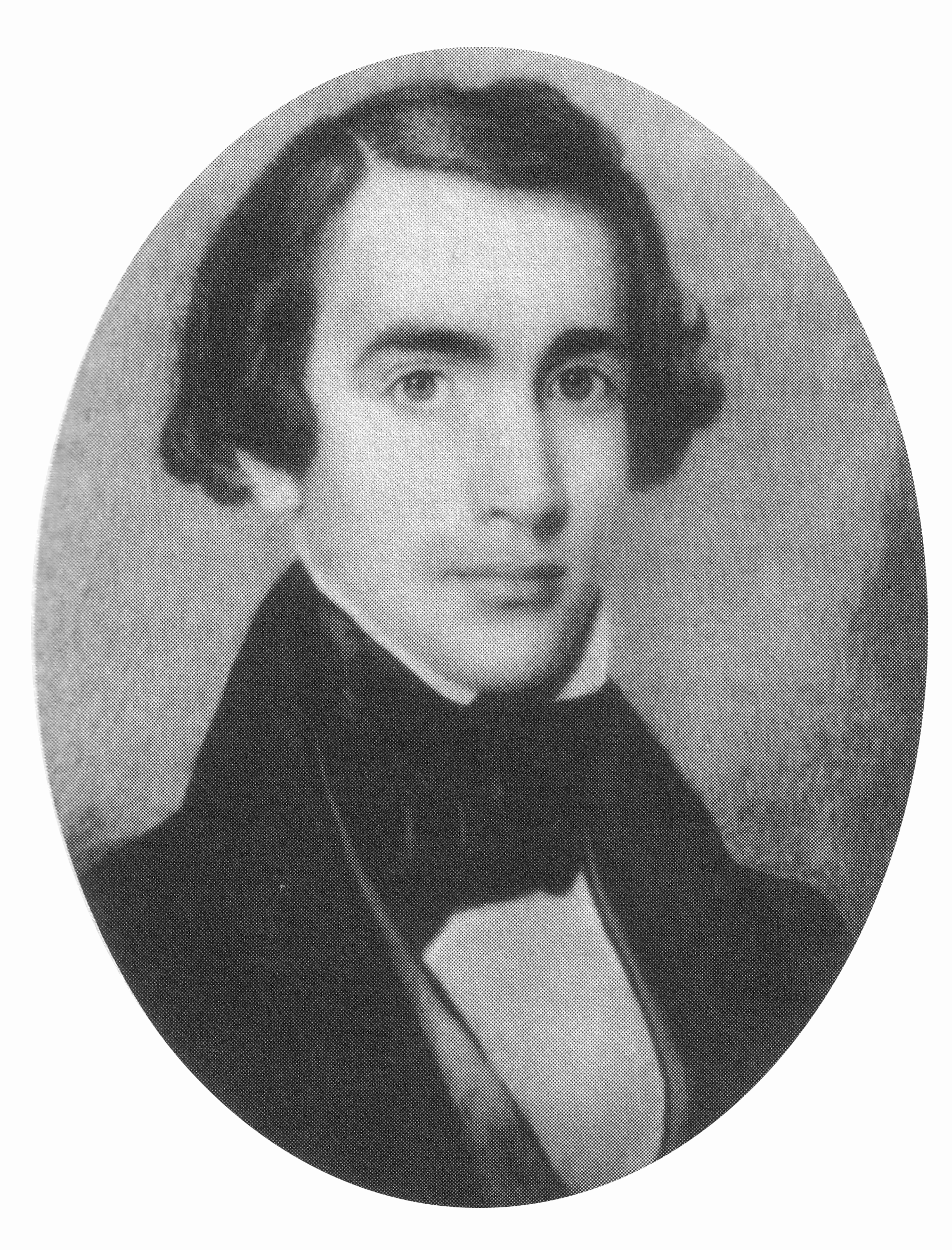
- Portrait of Speed as a young man

Member of the Kentucky House of Representatives
- In office 1848–1850

Personal details
- Born: November 14, 1814 Louisville, Kentucky, U.S.
- Died: May 29, 1882 (aged 67) Louisville, Kentucky, U.S.
- Resting place: Cave Hill Cemetery; Louisville, Kentucky, U.S.
- Spouse: Fanny Henning (m. 1842)
- Parent: John Speed (father)
- Relatives: James Speed (brother)
- Occupation: General store co-owner, real estate investor, plantation owner (through family), Kentucky representative
- Known for: Abraham Lincoln's best friend and a close confidant

Joshua Fry Speed (November 14, 1814 – May 29, 1882) was an American planter and businessman. He was a close friend of then-future President Abraham Lincoln from his days in Springfield, Illinois, where Speed was a partner in a general store. He first met Lincoln in 1837. Later, Speed returned to Kentucky where he farmed and invested in real estate. He also served one term in the Kentucky House of Representatives in 1848.

== Life ==
=== Ancestors, family and early life ===
Joshua Fry Speed was born at Farmington, Louisville, Kentucky, to Judge John Speed and Lucy Gilmer Speed (née Fry) on November 14, 1814. On his father's side, Speed's ancestry can be traced back to 17th-century cartographer and historian John Speed. John Speed's great-grandfather (James Speed) emigrated to Virginia in 1695. James Speed's grandson, Captain James Speed, fought in the American Revolution and was seriously wounded in 1781, resulting in the Continental Congress awarding him 7,500 acres in the territory of Kentucky. He settled there in 1782 and became a judge and land speculator, eventually accumulating 45,000 acres in central Kentucky and joining the territorial conventions by which Kentucky became separated from Virginia. One of Captain Speed's six children, John Speed, owned a store in the 1790s and operated a salt works using leased slaves. In the 1800s, his father gave him a large tract on which to begin farming. He grew staples and the labor-intensive cash crop of hemp. He would acquire other businesses as well, including a smithery. By his death in 1840, he had become one of Kentucky's largest slave-owners with 54.

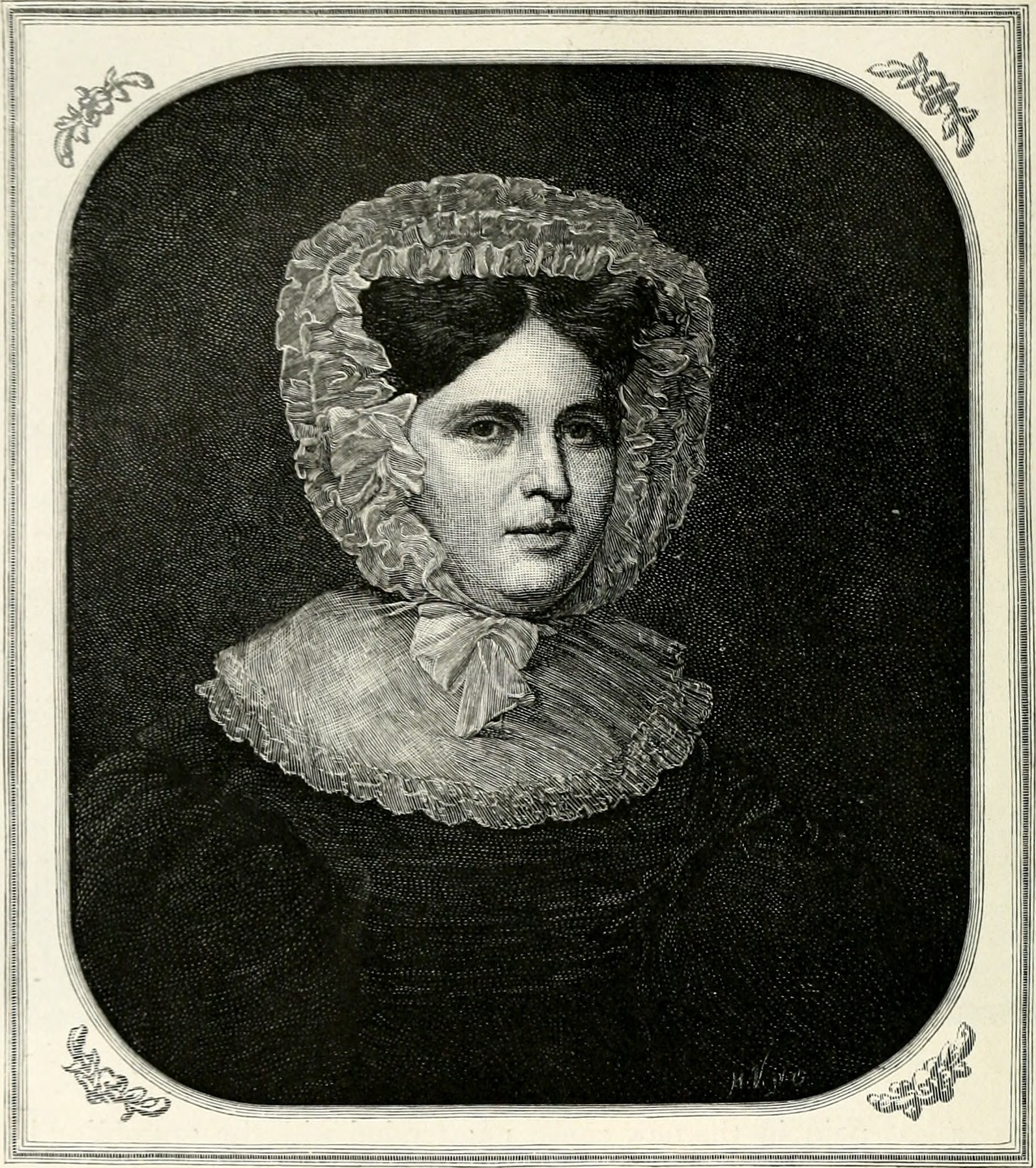
Lucy Speed, mother of Joshua

In 1808, following the death of his first wife, John Speed married Lucy Gilmer Fry. She had come from Virginia, where her family was close to Thomas Jefferson. Her father had inherited considerable wealth in land and slaves in Virginia, but left for Kentucky in 1788 or 1789. There, he opened a school in his home, where he taught a number of boys who later became prominent. Joshua Speed was the fifth of 11 children from the marriage; one of his siblings died in infancy the year Joshua was born. Joshua remained close to his mother until her death, but he seems to have had a strained relationship with his father, who complained of "all your abuse of me" when Joshua was 15. Depression seems to have run in the family, with evidence in his father, two of his brothers—James Speed showed signs of clinical depression—and Joshua himself. Lincoln even observed this in Joshua, remarking, "You are 'naturally of a nervous temperament.'"

=== Education and clerkship ===
Despite having had little formal education himself, Joshua's father wanted his children to have that advantage. Joshua was tutored by his maternal grandfather, Joshua Fry, and attended St. Joseph's College near Bardstown. Before completing college, however, he fell ill. He returned home and, despite his father's opposition, argued that he was ready to begin a career. He spent two to three years as a clerk in the largest wholesale establishment in Louisville. He then moved to Springfield, Illinois.

=== Career ===
Speed decided to try his fortune in the Midwest; in 1835 he set out for Springfield, Illinois. At the time, Springfield had a population of fewer than 1,500 people. Almost immediately upon arriving there, Speed engaged in merchandising and assisted in editing a local newspaper.

=== Speed and Lincoln ===
Speed had heard young Abraham Lincoln deliver a speech on a stump when Lincoln was running for election to the Illinois legislature. On April 15, 1837, Lincoln arrived at Springfield, the new state capital, to seek his fortune as a young lawyer, whereupon he met Joshua Speed at the general store Speed ran. Lincoln sublet Joshua's apartment above Speed's store, becoming his roommate, sharing a bed with him for four years, and becoming his lifelong best friend. Although bed-sharing between same sexes was a reasonably common practice in this period, this has led to speculation, including by Professor Thomas Balcerski, regarding Lincoln's sexuality.

On March 30, 1840, Judge John Speed died. Joshua announced plans to sell his store and return to his parents' large plantation house, Farmington, near Louisville, Kentucky. Lincoln, though notoriously awkward and shy around women, was then engaged to Mary Todd, a vivacious young society woman also from Kentucky. As the dates approached for both Speed's departure and Lincoln's marriage, Lincoln broke the engagement on the planned day of the wedding, January 1, 1841. Speed departed as planned, leaving Lincoln mired in depression and guilt.

Seven months later, in July 1841, Lincoln, still depressed, decided to visit Speed in Kentucky. Speed welcomed Lincoln to his paternal house, where the latter spent a month regaining his mental health. During his stay at Farmington, Lincoln rode into Louisville almost daily to discuss legal matters of the day with Attorney James Speed, Joshua's older brother. James Speed lent Lincoln books from his law library.

Joshua Speed and Lincoln disagreed over slavery, especially Speed's argument that Northerners should not care. In 1855, Lincoln wrote to Speed:

You know I dislike slavery; and you fully admit the abstract wrong of it. ... I also acknowledge your rights and my obligations, under the constitution, in regard to your slaves. I confess I hate to see the poor creatures hunted down, and caught, and carried back to their stripes, and unrewarded toils; but I bite my lip and keep quiet. In 1841, you and I had together a tedious low-water trip, on a Steam Boat from Louisville to St. Louis. You may remember, as I well do, that from Louisville to the mouth of the Ohio [River], there were, on board, ten or a dozen slaves, shackled together with irons. That sight was a continued torment to me; and I see something like it every time I touch the Ohio, or any other slave-border. It is hardly fair for you to assume, that I have no interest in a thing which has, and continually exercises, the power of making me miserable. You ought rather to appreciate how much the great body of the Northern people do crucify their feelings ...

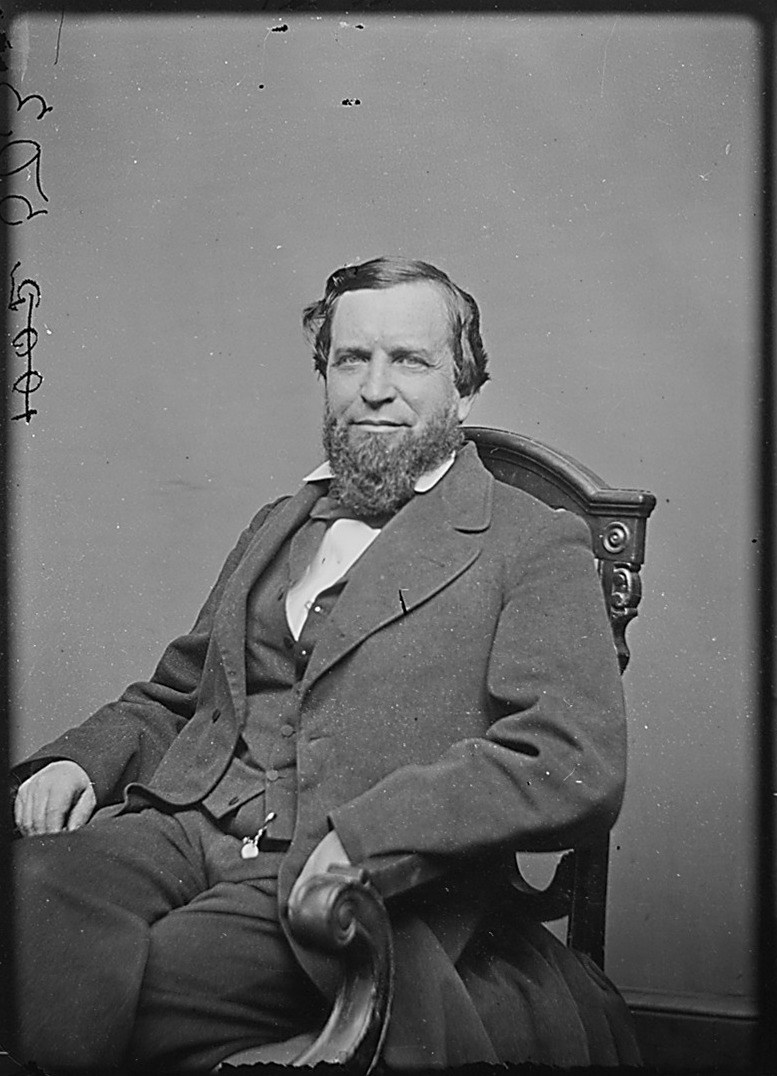
Joshua Fry Speed, c. 1860–1865

During Lincoln's presidential administration (March 4, 1861 – April 15, 1865), he offered Speed several government appointments. Speed refused each time, choosing to help in other ways. Speed disagreed with Lincoln on the slavery question but remained loyal, and coordinated Union activities in Kentucky during the American Civil War. His brother, James Speed, served as Lincoln's Attorney General beginning in November 1864, after the resignation of Edward Bates. In explaining the nomination to Congress, Lincoln acknowledged that he did not know James as well as he knew Joshua.

=== Later activities ===
After the assassination of Lincoln by John Wilkes Booth, Speed organized a memorial service in Louisville for the departed leader. He also pledged his support to the new President Andrew Johnson administration (April 15, 1865, to March 3, 1869). Sixty members of the Speed family gave money for a monument to honor Lincoln in Springfield. Joshua Speed also wrote lengthy letters to William Herndon, a former law partner of Lincoln who had set about to write a biography of Lincoln.

== Death and legacy ==
Joshua Speed died on May 29, 1882, in Louisville, Kentucky. He is interred in Cave Hill Cemetery in Louisville. His family's estate, Farmington, is now listed on the National Register of Historic Places, and while the farm is substantially reduced in size, the house has been restored and has become a local event venue, and the focus of living history events.

== Alleged hoax diary ==
In 1999, the author and gay activist Larry Kramer claimed that he had uncovered new primary sources which shed fresh light on Lincoln's sexuality. The alleged sources included a hitherto-unknown Joshua Speed diary and letters in which it was claimed Speed wrote explicitly about his relationship with Lincoln. The items were supposedly discovered hidden beneath the floorboards of the old store in which the two men lived, and they were said to reside in a private collection in Davenport, Iowa. Kramer died in 2020 and apparently never produced or showed anyone the supposed documents, although he published a novel in 2015, including some of his ideas about Speed and Lincoln that historian and psychoanalyst Charles Strozier found unconvincing as a matter of history or sexuality. The historian Gabor Boritt, referring to the alleged documents, wrote, "Almost certainly this is a hoax...."

== Further family and ancestry information ==
Joshua Speed's father, Judge John Speed, was born in Charlotte County, Virginia. John was first married to Abby Lemaster. They had four children, two of whom died in infancy:

- Thomas Speed
- Mary Speed (born 1800)
- Eliza Speed (born 1805)
- James Speed

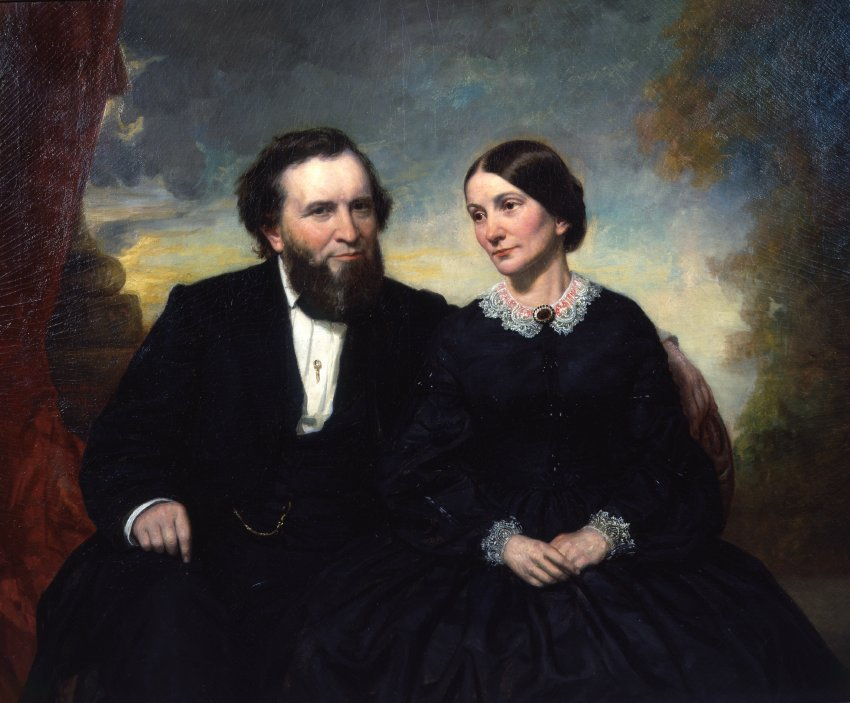
1864 painting of Joshua Fry and his wife Fanny Henning Speed

John was then married to Lucy Gilmer Fry. Lucy was born in Albemarle County, Virginia. They had eleven children:

- Thomas Speed (September 15, 1809 – 1812)
- Lucy Fry Speed (February 26, 1811 – 1893). Later married to James D. Breckinridge.
- James Speed (March 11, 1812 – June 12, 1887)
- Peachy Walker Speed (May 4, 1813 – January 18, 1881)
- Joshua Fry Speed (1814–1882)
- William Pope Speed (April 26, 1816 – June 28, 1863)
- Susan Fry Speed (September 30, 1817 – 1888)
- Major Philip Speed (April 12, 1819 – November 1, 1882)
- John Smith Speed (January 1, 1821 – 1886)
- Martha Bell Speed (September 8, 1822 – 1903)
- Ann Pope Speed (November 5, 1831 – 1838)

Joshua Speed began a courtship with Fanny Henning and married on February 15, 1842. They remained married until his death. They had no children.

Fanny Henning Speed bequeathed a large amount to Union College in Barbourville, Kentucky, and Speed Hall, listed on the National Register, is named for her.

== See also ==
- List of people from the Louisville metropolitan area
- Louisville in the American Civil War
- Sexuality of Abraham Lincoln
