= Farmington (Louisville, Kentucky) =

- U.S. National Register of Historic Places
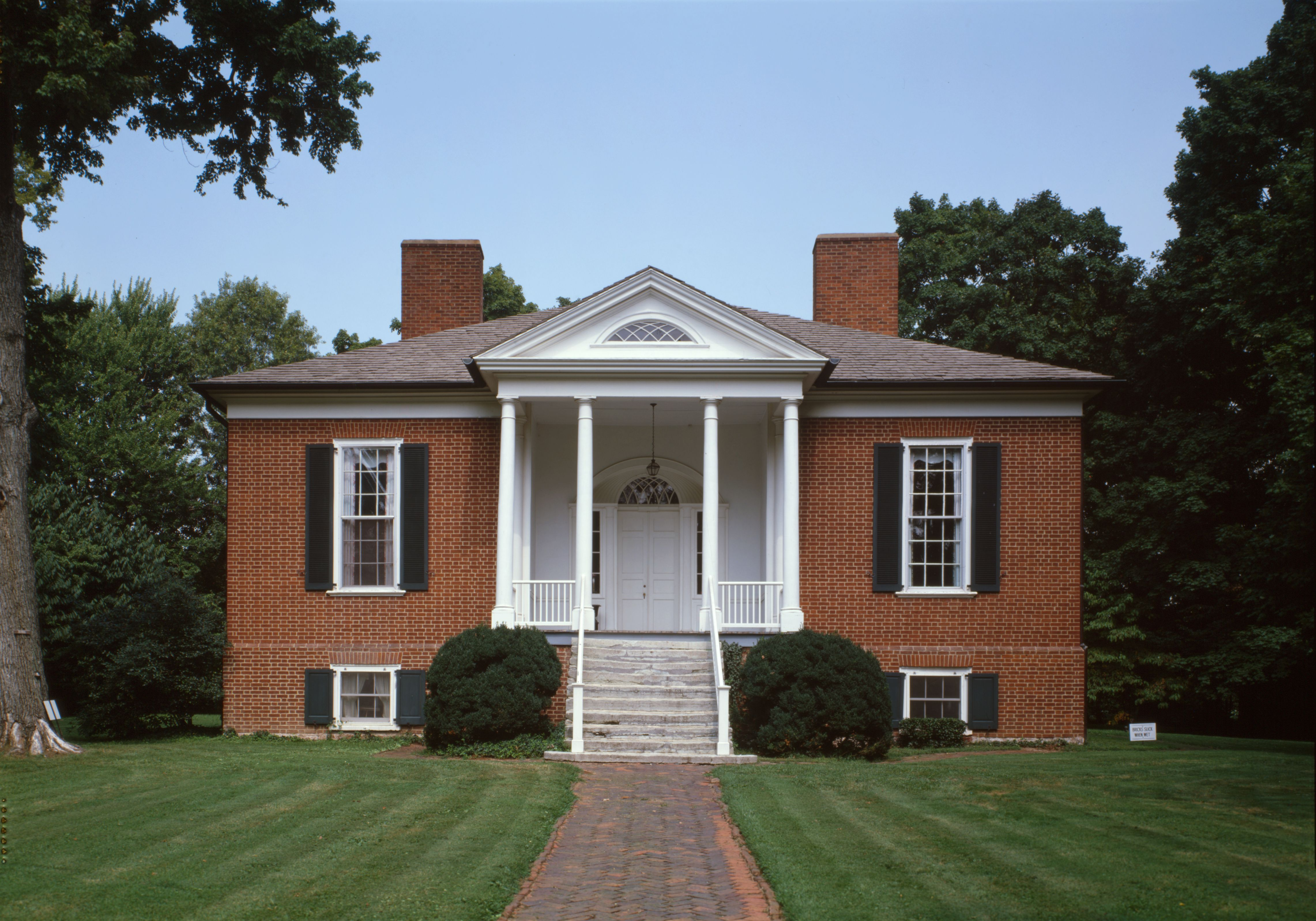
- Interactive map of Farmington
- Location: 3033 Bardstown Road; Louisville, Kentucky 40205
- Coordinates: 38°12′51.69″N 85°40′7.07″W
- Built: 1815–1816
- Architect: Paul Skidmore, possibly based on a plan by Thomas Jefferson
- Architectural style: Federal
- Website: visitfarmington.org
- NRHP reference No.: 72000536
- Added to NRHP: October 18, 1972

Farmington, an 18-acre (7.3 ha) historic site in Louisville, Kentucky, United States, was once the center of a hemp plantation owned by John and Lucy Speed. The 14-room, Federal-style brick plantation house was possibly based on a design by Thomas Jefferson and has several Jeffersonian architectural features. As many as 64 African Americans were enslaved by the Speed family at Farmington.

== History ==
The Farmington site was part of a military land grant given to Captain James Speed in 1780. His son, John Speed, completed Farmington on a tract of land in 1816. Built in the Federal architectural style, the house is based on plans by Thomas Jefferson, which are now in the Coolidge Collection at the Massachusetts Historical Society.

Speed built the house for his wife, Lucy Gilmer Fry, daughter of Joshua Fry and granddaughter of Dr. Thomas Walker, the guardian of Thomas Jefferson. Her aunt and uncle's home in Charlottesville, Virginia was called Farmington and had an addition designed by Thomas Jefferson.

Their son, Joshua Fry Speed, was an intimate, lifelong friend of Abraham Lincoln. While courting Mary Todd, Lincoln spent three weeks at Farmington in 1841 while recovering from mental and physical exhaustion. It was during this visit to Farmington in 1841 that Abraham Lincoln witnessed slavery on a plantation first-hand and he saw enslaved people chained together after he boarded a steamboat at the Louisville waterfront. In an 1855 letter to Joshua Speed, Lincoln wrote that the scene had continued to torment him.

John and Lucy's son, James Speed, was appointed Attorney General of the United States by Lincoln in 1863.

== Design ==
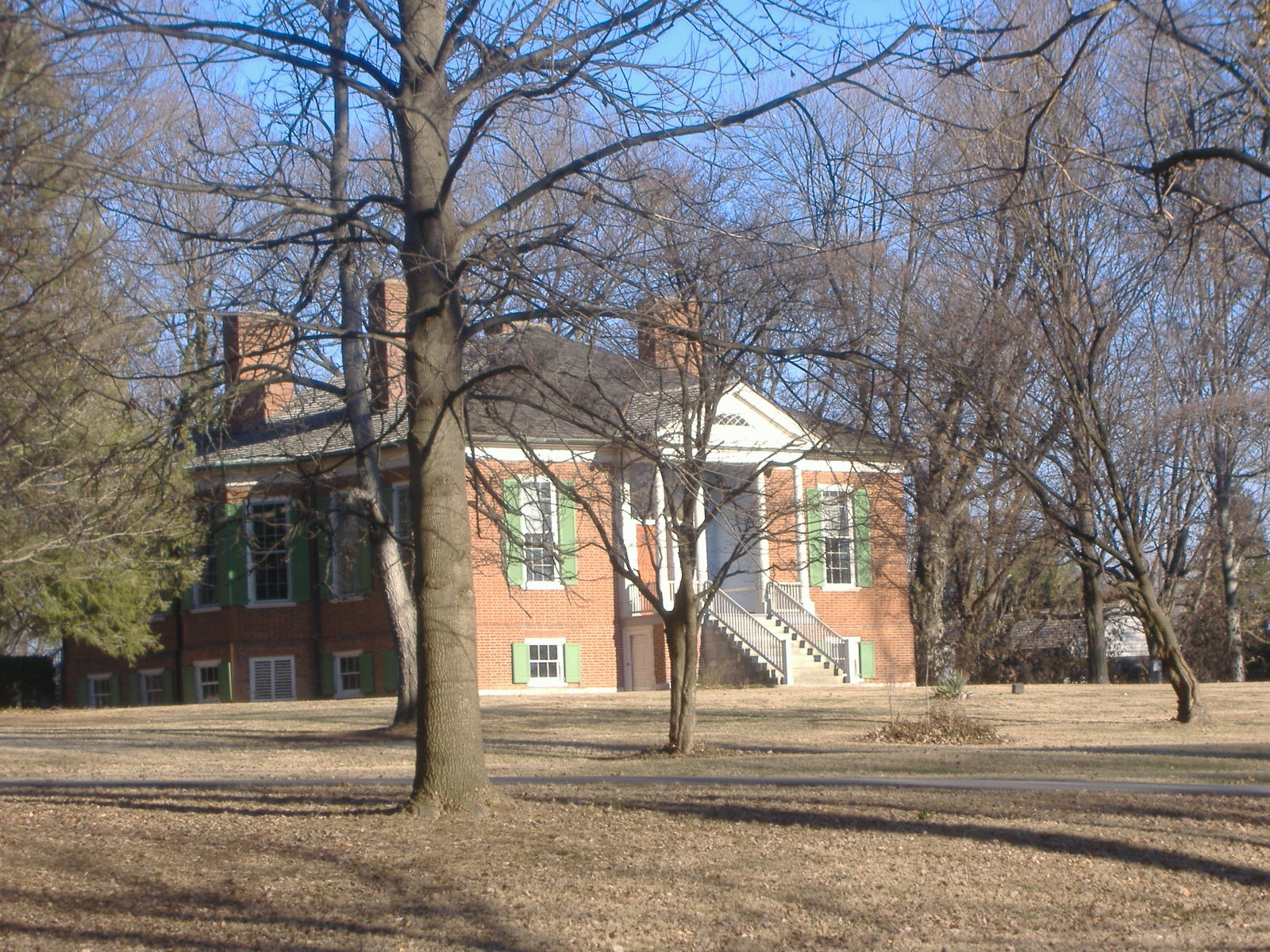
Side view of plantation house

Farmington consists of a single story above a raised basement. The building is roughly a square shape, measuring 62 feet (19 m) wide by 50 feet (15 m) long. There are 14 rooms of living quarters on the first floor, with servant's and children's rooms on the basement floor. The first story is about five feet above ground level, with the basement windows completely above ground. All rooms in the basement are finished.

A simplified classical cornice under the hipped roof helps give the house its pleasing, proportional appearance. The front entrance is a tetrastyle portico (porch) with slender Doric columns, reached by 11 steps. The porch's gable features a semi-circular ventilation window.

The front door opens into a central hall which has a door at the back leading to a rear hall. These two halls give access to all rooms on the first floor, as well as stairs to the basement and attic. The stairs are hidden, which is a common feature of homes designed by Jefferson.

A notable feature of the first floor are two 24-foot (7.3 m) wide octagonal rooms, another distinctive feature of Jeffersonian architecture. One of the octagonal rooms is a dining hall, the other is a parlor. Other rooms on the first floor are two bedrooms, a study and a family sitting room.

== Preservation ==
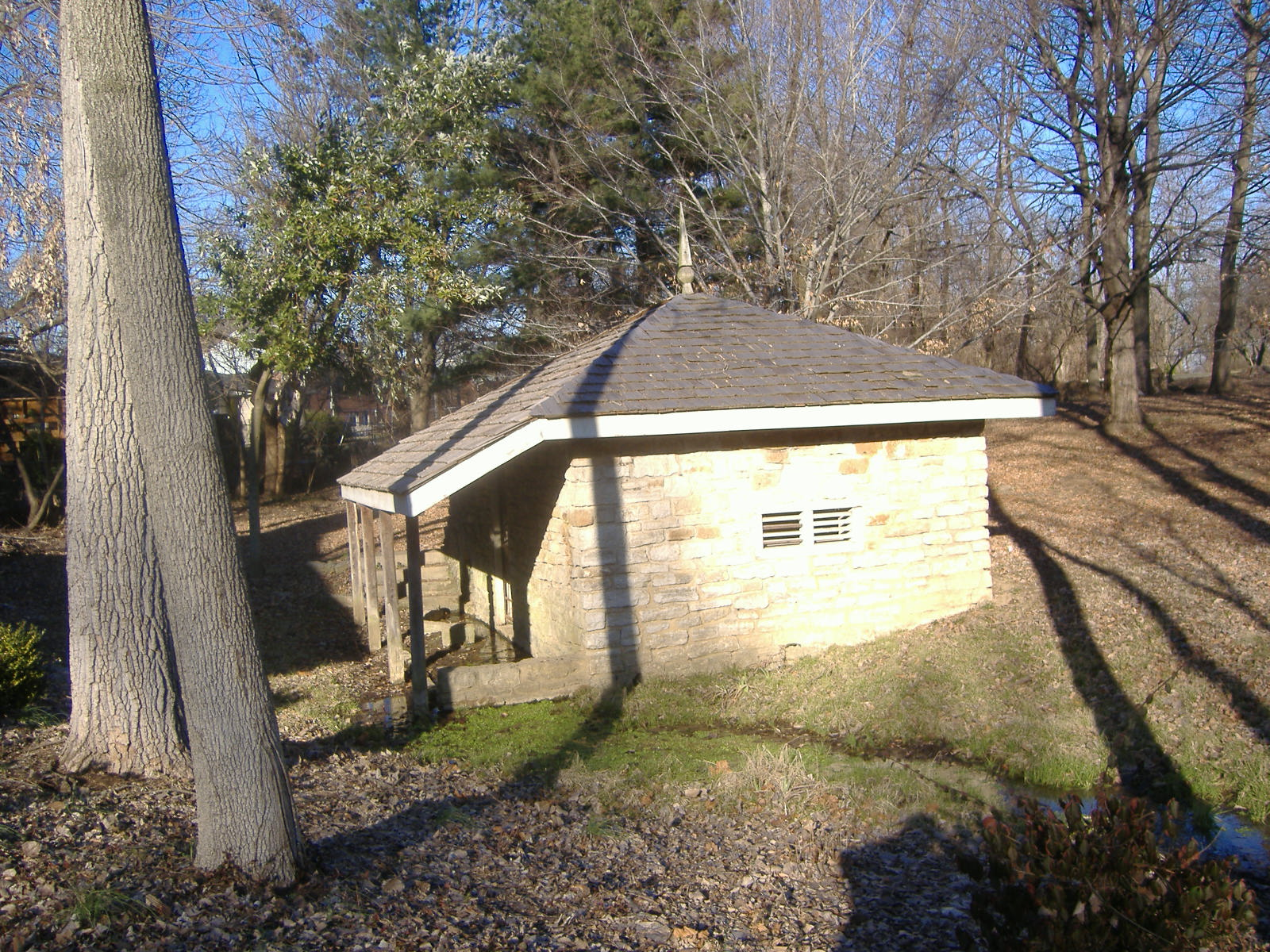
Springhouse on property

Farmington has been restored as a tourist attraction and a re-creation of a 19th-century plantation. The house itself had been altered little at the time it was purchased by the Historic Homes Foundation for preservation in 1958. The only substantial change in its interior or exterior appearance since construction was the installation of a tin roof in place of the original wood shingles, which was done for fire safety reasons.

As of 2011, Farmington and a small visitors center are open to the public for tours and the site is available for special events and rentals.

In 2012, Farmington's owner, Historic Homes Foundation, Inc., entered into an agreement to sell 5 of the landmark's 18 acres to an adjoining landowner, Sullivan University, for use as a 300-space parking lot to be shared by both entities. Controversial questions about the proposal were raised in online media leading up to its consideration in the February 3, 2013, meeting of the Metro Louisville Landmarks Commission's Individual Landmarks Architectural Review Committee.

== See also ==
- Historic Locust Grove
- History of Louisville, Kentucky
- History of slavery in Kentucky
- List of attractions and events in the Louisville metropolitan area
- List of museums in the Louisville metropolitan area
- Louisville, Kentucky in the American Civil War
- Riverside, The Farnsley–Moremen Landing
