= John Speed (Kentucky) =

American jurist (1772–1840)

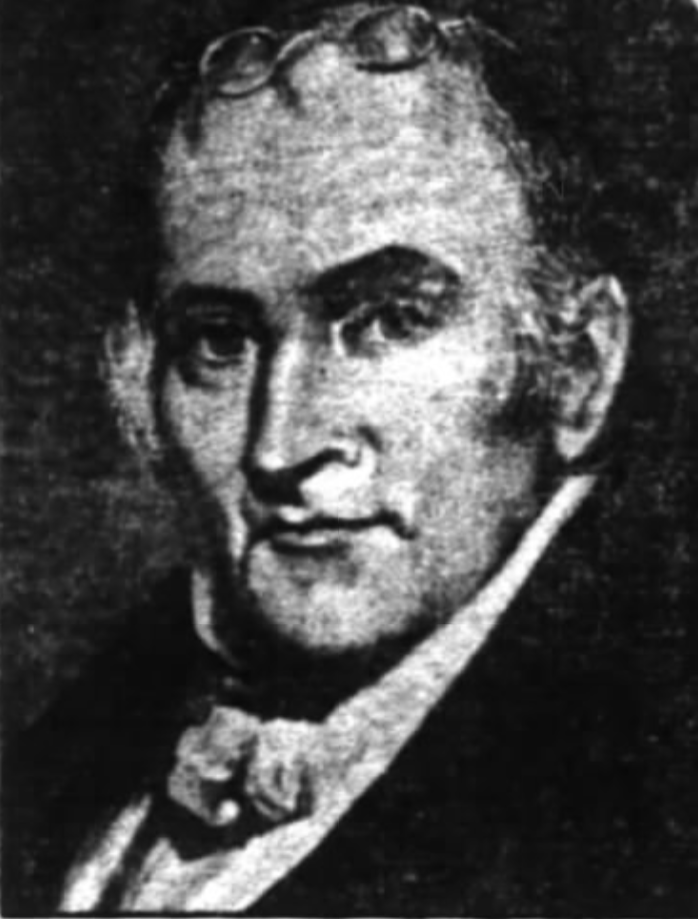
- Speed in 1900 newspaper
- Born: May 17, 1772
- Died: March 30, 1840 (aged 67)
- Resting place: Cave Hill Cemetery; Louisville, Kentucky, U.S.
- Occupations: Judge; farmer; soldier
- Spouses: Abby Lemaster (died 1807) Lucy Gilmer Fry (m. 1808)
- Children: 15, including James and Joshua Fry
- Relatives: Thomas Speed (brother); James Breckenridge Speed (grandson)

John Speed (May 17, 1772 – March 30, 1840) was an American judge and farmer in Louisville, Kentucky. He built the Farmington estate and served briefly in the American Indian Wars.

== Early life ==
John Speed was born on May 17, 1772, to Captain James Speed. He was ten years old when he came to Kentucky with his father. He received education from schools in Kentucky.

== Career ==
Speed worked with his brother Thomas Speed in merchandising and making salt at the licks near Shepherdsville, Kentucky. In 1791, Speed served during the American Indian Wars under Brigadier General Charles Scott.

Speed was appointed as a judge of Quarter Sessions Court in Jefferson County, Kentucky. In 1828, he wrote a series of articles on political topics. They were published as a paper called The Focus and he signed himself as "Plain Farmer".

== Personal life ==
Speed owned a large tract of land near Louisville called Beargrass. He started building a large house on this land called Farmington in early 1810. The main crop of the land was hemp. He was a slave owner. As noted in the Speed family history that cites the autobiography by Reverend James Freeman Clark, is the claim that Speed was against slavery, “Although he was a slaveholder, he was an Emancipationist. He deplored the existence of slavery, but, under the laws regulating the institution, he could not do otherwise than he did, which was treat his slaves humanely and make them comfortable and as contented as possible."

By 1800, Speed married Abby Lemaster and they had four children, James, a second child named James, Mary and Eliza. Only Mary and Eliza survived infancy. They lived at Pond Creek in Jefferson County. Abby Lemaster died in July 1807. Speed married Lucy Gilmer Fry (1788–1874), daughter of Joshua and Peachy Fry, in 1808. They had eleven children: Thomas, Lucy Fry, James, Peachy Walker, Joshua Fry, William Pope, Susan Fry, Philip, John Smith, Martha Bell and Ann Pope.

Peachy Speed Peay's daughter Eliza married John Hardin Ward, who served in the American Civil War with the 27th Kentucky Volunteers. Lucy Fry Speed married James D. Breckinridge, a U.S. Representative from Kentucky. Philip Speed married Emma Keats, niece of John Keats. Joshua Fry Speed roomed with Abraham Lincoln in Springfield, Illinois and remained friends with Lincoln. James Speed became a lawyer and was appointed as U.S. Attorney General by President Lincoln. His grandson was James Breckenridge Speed, a businessman in Louisville.

Speed died on March 30, 1840. He left Farmington and the land to Lucy Fry Speed. He was originally buried at the Farmington homestead, but his remains were moved to the Cave Hill Cemetery in Louisville.

When Speed died, he owned 57 slaves who were "listed as inventory." His daughter Susan "received five slaves". In 1845, his daughter Peachy "took over plantation management". Peachy also owned slaves she had ascertained from her marriage to Austin L. Peay in 1832.

In 1841, Abraham Lincoln went to visit his friend Joshua at the Farmington Plantation, where he would stay for three weeks' time. The images of slavery he would witness firsthand left a lasting impression upon him. In a letter to Joshua's half sister Mary, he wrote: "They were chained six and six together. A small iron clevis was around the left wrist of each...So that the Negroes were strung together precisely like so many fish on a trot-line.” Almost a decade and a half later, Lincoln wrote another letter in 1855 to Joshua Speed, recalling how the slave images he had witnessed at Speed's plantation continued to haunt him.
