= 27th Kentucky Infantry Regiment =

- Active: March 21, 1862, to March 29, 1865
- Country: United States
- Allegiance: Union
- Branch: Infantry
- Engagements: Battle of Shiloh; Siege of Corinth; Battle of Perryville; Knoxville Campaign; Atlanta campaign Battle of Kennesaw Mountain; Siege of Atlanta; Battle of Jonesboro

The 27th Kentucky Infantry Regiment was an infantry regiment that served in the Union Army during the American Civil War.

== Service ==
The 27th Kentucky Infantry Regiment was organized at Rochester, Kentucky and mustered in for a three-year enlistment on March 21, 1862, under the command of Colonel Charles D. Pennebaker.

The regiment was attached to 19th Brigade, 4th Division, Army of the Ohio, to September 1862. 19th Brigade, 4th Division, II Corps, Army of the Ohio, to November 1862. 2nd Brigade, 2nd Division, Left Wing, XIV Corps, Army of the Cumberland, November 1862. District of Western Kentucky, Department of the Ohio, to June 1863. Unattached, 2nd Division, XXIII Corps, Army of the Ohio, to August 1863. Unattached, Munfordville, Kentucky, 1st Division, XXIII Corps, to October 1863. 1st Brigade, 4th Division, XXIII Corps, to November 1863. 3rd Brigade, 1st Division, Cavalry Corps, Department of the Ohio, to April 1864. 3rd Brigade, 4th Division, XXIII Corps, to June 1864. 3rd Brigade, 2nd Division, XXIII Corps, to December 1864. 2nd Division, District of Kentucky and Department of Kentucky, to March 1865.

The 27th Kentucky Infantry mustered out of service on March 29, 1865.

== Detailed service ==
The regiment was at Elizabethtown and Grayson Springs, Kentucky, until March 1862. It was then ordered to Nashville, Tennessee, thence march to Savannah, Tennessee. It was present at the Battle of Shiloh on April 7. Advance on and siege of Corinth, Mississippi, April 29-May 30. Occupation of Corinth May 30 and pursuit to Booneville May 31-June 12. Buell's Campaign in northern Alabama and middle Tennessee June to August. At Athens, Alabama, until July 17, and at Murfreesboro, Tenn., until August 17. March to Louisville, Ky., in pursuit of Bragg August 21-September 26. Pursuit of Bragg into Kentucky October 1–22. Battle of Perryville October 8; skirmish at Danville October 11. Near Crab Orchard October 15. Big Rockcastle River October 16. March to Nashville, Tenn., October 22-November 7. Ordered to Munfordville, Kentucky, November 24, 1862.

The regiment did post duty at Munfordville as well as guarding the line of the Louisville & Nashville Railroad until September, 1863. Operations against Morgan December 22, 1862, to January 2, 1863. Joined Manson at Glasgow, Ky., and march to Knoxville, Tenn., September 1863. Burnside's Campaign in eastern Tennessee October 4–17. Duty at Loudon, Tenn., until November 14. Knoxville Campaign November 4-December 23. Action at Philadelphia October 24. Leiper's Ferry, Holston River, October 26–28. Rockford November 14. Stock Creek and Holston River November 15. Kingston and near Knoxville November 16. Siege of Knoxville November 17-December 5. About Bean's Station December 9–13. Russellville December 10. Bean's Station December 13–15. Rutledge December 16. Blain's Cross Roads December 16–19. Scout to Bean Station December 29–30. Operations about Dandridge January 26–28, 1864. Fair Garden January 27. Ordered to Mt. Sterling, Ky., February 1864. March to Kingston, Ga., and Join Sherman's Army May 23. Atlanta Campaign May 23-September 8. Kingston May 24. Battles about Dallas, New Hope Church and Allatoona Hills May 25-June 5. Operations about Marietta and against Kennesaw Mountain June 10-July 2. Pine Mountain June 11–14. Lost Mountain June 15–17. Muddy Creek June 17. Noyes Creek June 19. Kolb's Farm June 22. Assault on Kennesaw June 27. Nickajack Creek July 2–5. Chattahoochie River July 6–17. Decatur July 19. Howard House July 20. Siege of Atlanta July 22-August 25. Utoy Creek August 5–7. Flank movement on Jonesboro August 25–30. Battle of Jonesboro August 31-September 1. Lovejoy's Station September 2–6. Operations against Hood in northern Georgia and northern Alabama, September 29-November 3. Ordered to Kentucky November 14. Duty at Louisville and at Owensboro, Ky., operating against guerrillas until March 1865.

== Casualties ==
The regiment lost a total of 217 men during service; 1 officer and 34 enlisted men killed or mortally wounded, 1 officer and 181 enlisted men died of disease.

== Commanders ==
- Colonel Charles D. Pennebaker

== See also ==
- List of Kentucky Civil War Units
- Kentucky in the Civil War
