= Strathmoor Village, Kentucky =

- City
- Location of Strathmoor Village in Jefferson County, Kentucky

- Location within the state of Kentucky Strathmoor Village (the United States)
- Coordinates: 38°13′15″N 85°40′40″W
- Country: United States
- State: Kentucky
- County: Jefferson
- Incorporated: 1928

Government
  - Type: City
  - Mayor: Jay Bowman
  - Commissioner: Mark Klein
  - Commissioner: Tim Schroering
  - Commissioner: John Hauber
  - Commissioner: John Barrow

Area
  - Total: 0.10 sq mi (0.27 km^{2})
  - Land: 0.10 sq mi (0.27 km^{2})
  - Water: 0 sq mi (0.00 km^{2})
- Elevation: 545 ft (166 m)

Population (2020)
  - Total: 684
  - Density: 6,550.8/sq mi (2,529.29/km^{2})
- Time zone: UTC-5 (Eastern (EST))
  - Summer (DST): UTC-4 (EDT)
- ZIP Code: 40205
- Area code: 502
- FIPS code: 21-74082
- GNIS feature ID: 2405533
- Website: www.cityofstrathmoorvillage.com

Strathmoor Village is a home rule-class city in Jefferson County, Kentucky, United States. As of the 2020 census, Strathmoor Village had a population of 684.

== Geography ==
Strathmoor Village is located in central Jefferson County. It is bordered to the southwest by Strathmoor Manor, to the east by Kingsley, to the north by Seneca Gardens, and otherwise by Louisville.

U.S. Route 150 (Bardstown Road) forms the southwest border of the city, and Kentucky Route 155 (Taylorsville Road) forms the northern border. Downtown Louisville is 5 miles (8 km) to the northwest.

According to the United States Census Bureau, Strathmoor Village has a total area of 0.10 square miles (0.27 km^{2}), all land.

== History ==
Strathmoor Village was incorporated in 1928.

Strathmoor Village annexed the city of Strathmoor Gardens in 1993.

== Demographics ==
Historical population
Census	Pop.	Note	%±
1940	471		—
1950	466		−1.1%
1960	498		6.9%
1970	540		8.4%
1980	466		−13.7%
1990	361		−22.5%
2000	625		73.1%
2010	648		3.7%
2020	684		5.6%
U.S. Decennial Census

As of the census of 2000, there were 625 people, 261 households, and 176 families residing in the city. The population density was 6,311.9 inhabitants per square mile (2,437.0/km^{2}). There were 267 housing units at an average density of 2,696.5 per square mile (1,041.1/km^{2}). The racial makeup of the city was 96.16% White, 1.44% African American, 1.28% Asian, 0.48% from other races, and 0.64% from two or more races. Hispanic or Latino of any race were 0.16% of the population.

There were 261 households, out of which 33.0% had children under the age of 18 living with them, 56.3% were married couples living together, 9.6% had a female householder with no husband present, and 32.2% were non-families. 27.6% of all households were made up of individuals, and 12.3% had someone living alone who was 65 years of age or older. The average household size was 2.39 and the average family size was 2.96.

In the city, the population was spread out, with 22.6% under the age of 18, 5.6% from 18 to 24, 28.6% from 25 to 44, 28.6% from 45 to 64, and 14.6% who were 65 years of age or older. The median age was 41 years. For every 100 females, there were 88.8 males. For every 100 females age 18 and over, there were 84.7 males.

The median income for a household in the city was $64,375, and the median income for a family was $73,438. Males had a median income of $47,656 versus $37,891 for females. The per capita income for the city was $30,370. None of the families and 0.8% of the population were living below the poverty line, including no under 18s and 2.5% of those over 64.
