= James Speed =

American lawyer and politician (1812–1887)

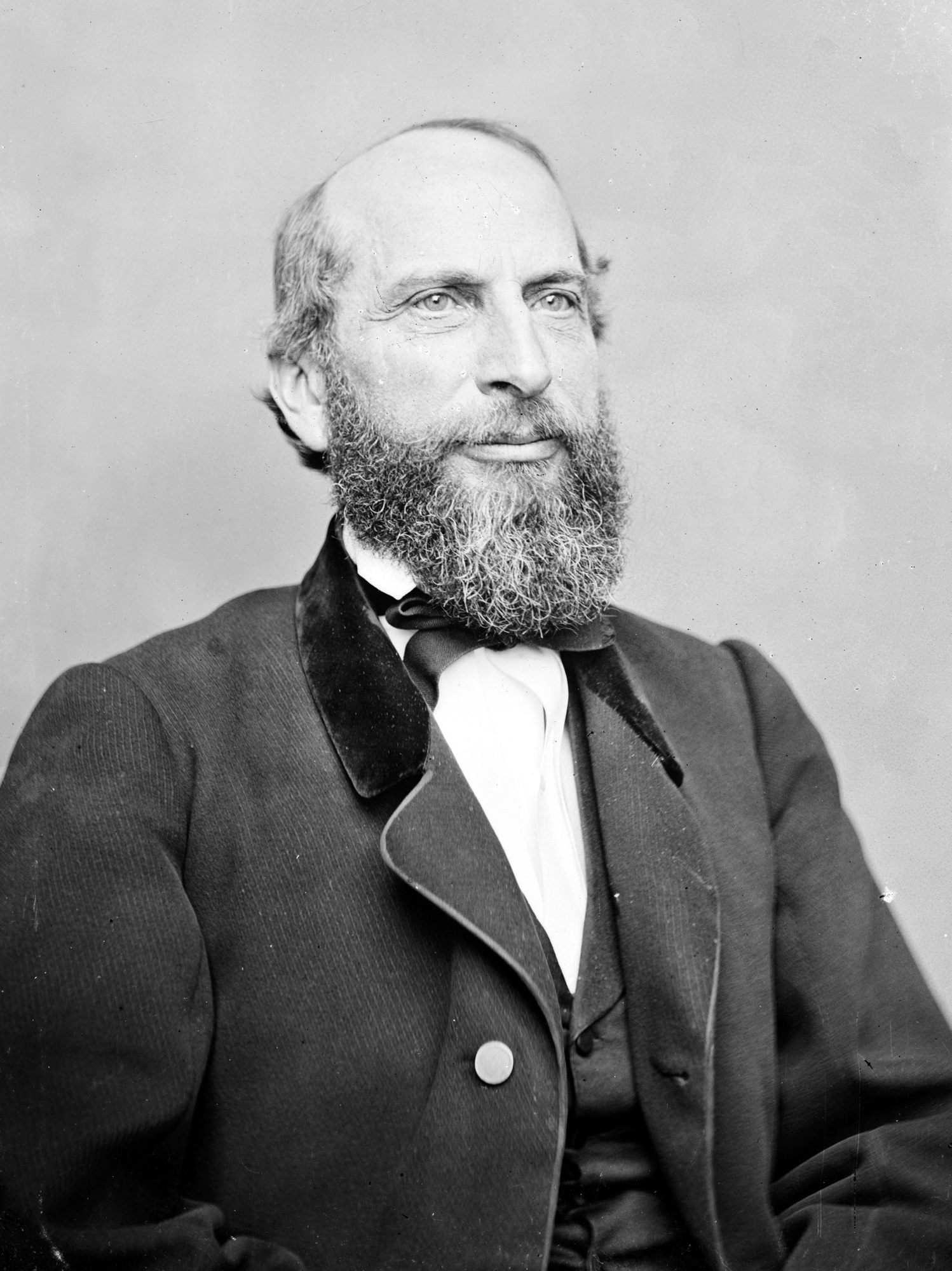

27th United States Attorney General
- In office December 2, 1864 – July 22, 1866
- President: Abraham Lincoln; Andrew Johnson
- Preceded by: Edward Bates
- Succeeded by: Henry Stanbery

Member of the Kentucky Senate from the 15th district
- In office August 1861 – August 3, 1863 Serving with Charles T. Worthington
- Preceded by: Lovell Rousseau
- Succeeded by: Charles T. Worthington

Member of the Kentucky House of Representatives
- In office 1847–1849

Personal details
- Born: March 11, 1812 Jefferson County, Kentucky, U.S.
- Died: June 25, 1887 (aged 75) Louisville, Kentucky, U.S.
- Resting place: Cave Hill Cemetery; Louisville, Kentucky, U.S.
- Party: Whig (Before 1860); Republican (1860–1887)
- Spouse: Jane Cochran
- Parent: John Speed (father)
- Relatives: Joshua Fry Speed (brother)
- Education: St. Joseph's College, Kentucky (BA); Transylvania University (LLB)

Military service
- Allegiance: United States
- Branch/service: United States Army
- Unit: Louisville Home Guard
- Battles/wars: American Civil War

James Speed (March 11, 1812 – June 25, 1887) was an American lawyer, politician, and professor who was in 1864 appointed by Abraham Lincoln to be the United States Attorney General. Speed previously served in the Kentucky legislature and in local political offices.

== Early life ==
Speed was born in Jefferson County, Kentucky to Judge John Speed and his second wife, Lucy Gilmer Fry. He was a distant descendant of the English cartographer John Speed and brother of Joshua Fry Speed. He graduated from St. Joseph's College in Bardstown, Kentucky, studied law at Transylvania University and was admitted to the bar at Louisville, in 1833.

== Career ==
In 1841 Speed met fellow lawyer and future President Abraham Lincoln while Lincoln was staying at Farmington, the Speed family home in Louisville, while visiting James's brother, Joshua (whom he had befriended while the two lived in Springfield, Illinois). During Lincoln's stay, the two lawyers met almost daily to discuss legal matters of the day. James Speed lent Lincoln books from his law library.

Unlike his brother Joshua, James Speed opposed slavery and was active in the Whig Party. In 1847 Speed was elected to the Kentucky House of Representatives. At this early point in his career, Speed was already agitating for the emancipation of American slaves. However, Kentucky voters did not share these views, and he failed to win election as delegate to the 1849 Kentucky Constitutional Convention.

From 1851 to 1854, Speed served on the Louisville Board of Aldermen, including two years as its president. He taught as a professor in the Law Department of the University of Louisville from 1856 to 1858, and would later return to teach from 1872 to 1879. He was also a member of the Louisville law firm Stites & Harbison.

=== Civil War era ===
As the coming Civil War was increasing in likelihood, Speed worked to keep Kentucky in the Union. He also became a commander of the Louisville Home Guard. Elected to the Kentucky Senate in a 1861 special election following the resignation of Lovell Rousseau, Speed became the leader of the pro-Union forces. In 1862 he introduced a bill to "confiscate the property" of those supporting the Confederacy in Kentucky.

In December 1864, United States President Abraham Lincoln appointed Speed Attorney General of the United States. After Lincoln's assassination, Speed became increasingly associated with the Radical Republicans and advocated allowing male African Americans to vote. Disillusioned with the increasingly conservative policies of former Democratic President Andrew Johnson, Speed resigned from the Cabinet in July 1866 and resumed the practice of law.

=== Postwar career ===
Speed was a delegate to the National Union Convention in Philadelphia in 1866 and fellow delegates chose him as the convention's president. However, Speed's racial views were unpopular in Kentucky. Speed ran to become U.S. Senator from Kentucky in 1867, as President Johnson's ally Senator James Guthrie (a Unionist and former slaveholder) retired citing health issues. However, voters instead elected Democrat Thomas C. McCreery.

In 1868, Speed ran for the Republican nomination for Vice President of the United States but the convention instead chose Schuyler Colfax.

Speed also ran for U.S. Representative from Kentucky's 5th District in 1870, to succeed Democrat Asa Grover, who had been accused of disloyalty but was exonerated and finished his only term. However, voters instead selected Democrat Boyd Winchester to fill the seat. Speed also was a delegate to Republican National Convention from Kentucky in 1872.

He was elected a 3rd class companion of the Military Order of the Loyal Legion of the United States in recognition of his service to the Union during the Civil War.

== Death and legacy ==
Speed died in Louisville in 1887, and is interred at Cave Hill Cemetery in that city. His family's estate, Farmington, is now listed on the National Register of Historic Places, and while the farm is substantially reduced in size, the house has been restored and has become a local event venue, and the focus of living history events.

== In popular culture ==
- Speed was portrayed by William von Hardenburg in the 1924 film The Dramatic Life of Abraham Lincoln.
- The actor John Lescault portrayed Speed in the 1998 television film The Day Lincoln Was Shot.
- In the 2012 film Lincoln, James Speed was portrayed by Richard Topol.

== See also ==
- Farmington Historic Plantation
- List of people from the Louisville metropolitan area
- Louisville in the American Civil War

Legal offices
| Preceded by Edward Bates | U.S. Attorney General; Served under: Abraham Lincoln, Andrew Johnson; 1864–1866 | Succeeded by Henry Stanbery |
