= Sandage =

Sandage is a surname that is likely an Americanized form of the Polish surname Sandacz, which comes from the Polish name for perch. Notable people with the surname include:

- Allan Sandage (1926–2010), American astronomer
- Scott Sandage, American cultural historian
