= Abraham Lincoln Institute =

US non-profit company

- Company type: Non-profit organization
- Industry: Historical research
- Founded: Maryland, U.S. (June 9, 1997)
- Founder: Paul Verduin
- Website: www.lincoln-institute.org

The Abraham Lincoln Institute (ALI), founded in 1997, is an American non-profit organization promoting scholarly research on the subject of Abraham Lincoln. The institute uses dissertation prizes, book awards, and an annual Lincoln symposium to encourage and present scholarship on the life and legacy of Abraham Lincoln. These annual symposia, presented at the National Archives in College Park, MD and more recently at Ford's Theatre in Washington, DC, are a venue for both emerging and highly renowned Lincoln scholars to present the findings of their current research. They are attended by the general public and have been frequently filmed by organizations such as the National Archives and C-SPAN.

== Founding and organization ==
The Abraham Lincoln Institute was incorporated in the State of Maryland on 9 June 1997. Its formal membership consists solely of a board of directors, the majority of whom must be nationally recognized scholars on the subjects of Abraham Lincoln or the American Civil War. The board of directors meets at least twice a year for the purpose of planning educational programs and the symposium, election of officers, and discussion of other business, such as the annual dissertation and book awards. The board of directors is guided by an executive committee. The board of directors includes:

- Terry Alford
- John Barr
- Michael F. Bishop
- Michael Burlingame (vice-president)
- Joan E. Cashin
- Joshua Claybourn
- Jason Emerson
- Clark Evans (General Secretary)
- Stephen Goldman
- William C. Harris
- Thomas A. Horrocks
- Charles M. Hubbard
- David J. Kent
- Donald R. Kennon
- Michelle Krowl
- Gordon Leidner (Treasurer)
- Fred J. Martin Jr.
- Stacy Pratt McDermott
- Edna Greene Medford
- Lucas E. Morel
- Michael P. Musick
- Trevor K. Plante
- Rodney A. Ross
- Scott Sandage
- David Seddelmeyer
- John R. Sellers
- Ron Soodalter (President)
- Paul R. Tetreault
- Derek Webb
- Jonathan W. White (chairman of the board)
- Robert S. Willard
- Douglas L. Wilson

== Dissertation and book awards ==
The ALI Board of Directors presents two awards annually. The Hay-Nicolay Dissertation Prize is given in conjunction with the Abraham Lincoln Association for what these two organizations consider to be the previous year's most noteworthy dissertation on the subject of Abraham Lincoln. The Abraham Lincoln Institute book award is given for the previous year's most noteworthy book on the subject of Abraham Lincoln. Book award winners in the past include Allen Guelzo for Redeemer President (2000) and Cullom Davis on behalf of the landmark Lincoln Legal Papers (2001).

== Annual symposium ==
Beginning in 1998, in the spring of each year, the institute has held a day-long symposium entitled The Latest in Lincoln Scholarship. At this symposium, Lincoln scholars present the results of their current research on the subject of Abraham Lincoln. The annual dissertation and book awards are also announced at this event. The symposium is held in the Washington, D.C., area and the general public is invited to attend, free of charge. Past speakers at symposium have included Lincoln scholars Douglas L. Wilson, Allen Guelzo, Michael Burlingame, Cullom Davis, and Gabor Boritt. Speakers have also included Lincoln researchers such as Doris Kearns Goodwin and Lewis Lehrman.
