= Michael Burlingame =

American historian (born 1941)

Michael A. Burlingame is an American historian noted for his works on Abraham Lincoln. He is the Naomi B. Lynn Distinguished Chair in Lincoln Studies at the University of Illinois Springfield. Burlingame has written or edited twenty books about Lincoln.

== Early life and education ==
Burlingame was born in Washington, D.C., and graduated from Phillips Academy in Andover, Massachusetts, in 1960. He studied at Princeton University (BA 1964) where he was a Woodrow Wilson Fellow and a Fulbright Scholar. He received a Ph.D. in history from Johns Hopkins University in 1971.

== Career ==
Burlingame was a member of the history department at Connecticut College in New London, Connecticut, from 1968 and until 2001. He joined the faculty of the University of Illinois Springfield in 2009.

Burlingame is a renowned scholar on the life of Abraham Lincoln. He authored The Inner World of Abraham Lincoln (1994) and the two-volume Abraham Lincoln: A Life (2008). The former was said to have launched a new "'golden age' of Lincoln scholarship." The latter won the 2010 Lincoln Prize, was a co-winner of the annual book prize awarded by the Abraham Lincoln Institute, and won the Russell P. Strange Book Award given annually by the Illinois State Historical Society for the best book on Illinois history. Burlingame has edited over a dozen volumes of Lincoln primary source materials.

Burlingame is a board member and officer of both the Abraham Lincoln Association and Abraham Lincoln Institute. In addition to his awards for Abraham Lincoln: A Life, he has received the Abraham Lincoln Association Book Prize (1996), the Lincoln Diploma of Honor from Lincoln Memorial University (1998), Honorable Mention for the Lincoln Prize, Gettysburg College (2001), and was inducted as a laureate of The Lincoln Academy of Illinois and awarded the Order of Lincoln (the state's highest honor) by the Governor of Illinois in 2009 as a Bicentennial Laureate.

Burlingame has charged several Lincoln scholars with plagiarism. In a 2000 review written for but not published by The Journal of American History because the editor found that it "clouds more than clarifies the issues", Burlingame alleged plagiarism in John C. Waugh's book, Reelecting Lincoln: The Battle for the 1864 Presidency. In the same review, Burlingame also charged that errors in citation and transcription were in Harold Holzer's book, The Lincoln Mailbag: America Writes to the President, 1861-1896. Holzer responded by charging that Burlingame had "riven the Lincoln field, and made it unpleasant to contribute scholarship. He's the Torquemada of academic journalism." In 1993, and again in 2002, Burlingame was involved in the Stephen B. Oates controversy, maintaining Oates plagiarized in his Lincoln biography, With Malice Toward None.

== Books ==
- The Inner World of Abraham Lincoln. University of Illinois Press. 1994. ISBN 978-0-252-06667-2.
- Michael Burlingame, ed. (1998) [1916]. Stevens, Walter B., A Reporter's Lincoln, Lincoln, Nebraska: University of Nebraska Press.
- Michael Burlingame, and Ettlinger, John R. Turner, eds. (1999). Inside Lincoln's White House: The Complete Civil War Diary of John Hay, Carbondale, Illinois: Southern Illinois University Press. ISBN 978-0809322626
- Michael Burlingame, ed. (2000). With Lincoln in the White House: Letters, Memoranda, and other Writings of John G. Nicolay, 1860-1865, Carbondale, Illinois: Southern Illinois University Press. ISBN 978-0809326839
- Michael Burlingame, ed. (2000) [1890]. Stoddard, William O., Inside the White House in War Times: Memoirs and Reports of Lincoln's Secretary, Lincoln, Nebraska: University of Nebraska Press.
- Michael Burlingame, ed. (2002). Thomas, Benjamin P., "Lincoln's Humor" and Other Essays, Champaign, Illinois: University of Illinois Press ISBN 978-0-252-02708-6
- Michael Burlingame, ed. (2002). Lincoln Observed: Civil War Dispatches of Noah Brooks. Johns Hopkins University Press. ISBN 9780801869150
- Michael Burlingame, ed. (2003) [1922]. Weik, Jesse W., The Real Lincoln: A Portrait, Lincoln, Nebraska: University of Nebraska Press. ISBN 978-0803298224
- Michael Burlingame, ed. (2006). At Lincoln's Side: John Hay's Civil War Correspondence and Selected Writings. Carbondale, Illinois: Southern Illinois University Press. ISBN 978-0-8093-2711-9.
- Michael Burlingame, ed. (2006). "Lincoln's Humor" and Other Essays, by Benjamin P. Thomas. University of Illinois Press.
- Michael Burlingame, ed. (2007). Abraham Lincoln: The Observations of John G. Nicolay and John Hay. Carbondale, Illinois: Southern Illinois University Press. ISBN 978-0-8093-3863-4. Includes excerpts from Abraham Lincoln: A History.
- Lincoln and the Civil War. Concise Lincoln Library. Carbondale and Edwardsville: Southern Illinois University Press. 2011. ISBN 978-0-8093-3053-9. Review
- Michael Burlingame, ed. (2018). Sixteenth President-in-Waiting: Abraham Lincoln and the Springfield Dispatches of Henry Villard, 1860–1861, Carbondale, Illinois: Southern Illinois University Press. ISBN 978-0809336432
- Abraham Lincoln: A Life. Vol. 1. Johns Hopkins University Press. 2008. ISBN 978-0-8018-8993-6.
- Abraham Lincoln: A Life. Vol. 2. Johns Hopkins University Press. 2008. ISBN 978-1-4214-1058-6.
- Abraham Lincoln: A Life, edited and abridged by Jonathan W. White. Johns Hopkins University Press. 2023. ISBN 9781421445557
- An American Marriage: The Untold Story of Abraham Lincoln and Mary Todd. Berkeley and Oakland, CA: Pegasus Books, 2021. ISBN 978-1643137346
- The Black Man's President: Abraham Lincoln, African Americans, and the Pursuit of Racial Equality. Berkeley and Oakland, CA: Pegasus Books, 2021. ISBN 978-1643138138
- Michael Burlingame, ed. (2025). Whitney, Henry C. Lincoln the Citizen, February 12, 1809 to March 4, 1861: The Complete Version. University of Illinois Press.
