= Scott Sandage =

American cultural historian

Scott A. Sandage is a cultural historian at Carnegie Mellon University. He is best known as the author of Born Losers: A History of Failure in America, which was selected as an "Editor's Choice" book by Atlantic Monthly, and was awarded the 34th Annual Thomas J. Wilson Prize, for the best "first book" accepted by Harvard University Press. In 2007 he was named as one of America's Top Young Historians by the History News Network.

Sandage was born in 1964 in Mason City, Iowa. He graduated from the University of Iowa (B.A., 1985) and from Rutgers University (M.A., 1992; Ph.D., 1995) in New Brunswick, New Jersey. Active as a public historian, Sandage has been a consultant to the Smithsonian Institution, the National Archives, the National Park Service, an off-Broadway play, and film and radio documentaries. He is on the board of directors for the Abraham Lincoln Institute and is an expert on the Lincoln Memorial. His commentaries have appeared in The New York Times, The Washington Post, The Industry Standard, Fast Company magazine, and other periodicals. He contributed an essay on "loserdom" to the 2004 Whitney Biennial exhibition catalog.

As of 2020, his next book project is entitled Laughing Buffalo in Paris: A Tall Tale of Race from the Half-Breed Rez.

== Selected works ==
=== Books ===
- Sandage, Scott A. Born Losers: A History of Failure in America. Cambridge, Massachusetts: Harvard University Press, 2005. ISBN 0-674-01510-X, ISBN 0-674-02107-X
- Sandage, Scott A. (editor) Democracy in America by Alexis de Tocqueville, abridgement with annotations and introduction (New York: HarperPerennial, 2007).

=== Articles ===
- "The Gilded Age", in A Companion to American Cultural History, ed. Halttunen (London: Blackwell, 2008).
- "The L on Your Forehead", thematic essay about art and failure, Catalog of the 2004 Biennial Exhibition, Whitney Museum of American Art (New York: Harry N. Abrams, 2004), 94–101.
- James Longhurst and Scott Sandage, "Appropriate Technology and Journal Writing: Structured Dialogues that Enhance Learning", College Teaching 45 (Spring 2004): 1–6.
- "Gender and the Economics of the Sentimental Market in Nineteenth-Century America", Social Politics vol. 6, no. 2 (Summer 1999), 105–130.
- "The Gaze of Success: Failed Men and the Sentimental Marketplace, 1873-1893", in Sentimental Men: Masculinity and the Politics of Affect in American Culture, ed. Chapman and Hendler (University of California Press, 1999).
- "A Marble House Divided: The Lincoln Memorial, the Civil Rights Movement, and the Politics of Memory, 1939-1963", Journal of American History, vol. 80, no. 1 (June 1993), pp. 135–167; reprinted in Race and the Production of Modern American Nationalism, ed. Scott-Childress, (Garland Press, 1998), 273–311; and Charles Payne and Adam Green, eds., Time Longer than Rope: A Century of African-American Activism (NYU Press, 2003), 492–535.
- “Sorting the War Dead into Winners and Losers”, History News Network, 11 September 2006.
- “Dead End for the Freedom Trail” (2002), National Coalition to Save Our Mall, Washington, D.C.
- “Old Rags, Some Grand”, Cabinet Magazine (Summer 2002): 88–89.
- "'Help' Wanted: Begging Letters to John D. Rockefeller", Research Reports from the Rockefeller Archive Center (Spring 2000)
- “Why One Gay Professor Would Leave Pennsylvania”, Pittsburgh Post-Gazette, OpEd Section, 21 November, reprinted in Philadelphia Gay News 3–9 December 1999, pp. 10, 12.
- "Marian Anderson" and "Abraham Lincoln", in The Oxford Companion to African American Literature, ed. Andrews (Oxford, 1997); both selected for inclusion in The Concise Oxford Companion to African American Literature (Oxford, 2001).
- “From Puritan to Yankee Doodle Dandy”, review essay on Richard L. Bushman, The Refinement of America, American Quarterly, vol. 46, no. 4 (December 1994), 605–611.
