= Douglas L. Wilson =

American academic (born 1935)

Douglas L. Wilson (born November 10, 1935) is the George A. Lawrence Distinguished Service Professor Emeritus of English at Knox College in Galesburg, Illinois, where he taught from 1961 to 1994. He then was the founding director of the Robert H. Smith International Center for Jefferson Studies at the Thomas Jefferson Foundation (Monticello) in Charlottesville, Virginia. In his retirement, he returned to Knox College to found and co-direct the Lincoln Studies Center with his colleague Rodney O. Davis.

Wilson is also a two-time winner of the Lincoln Prize for Lincoln's Sword: The Presidency and the Power of Words, published in November 2006, as well as Honor's Voice in 1999.

== Honors/grants ==
- Order of Lincoln, Lincoln Academy, inducted Wilson a Laureate of The Lincoln Academy of Illinois and awarded the Order of Lincoln (the state's highest honor) by the Governor of Illinois in 2009 as a Bicentennial Laureate, 2009.
- Honorary Degree, D. H. L., Doane College, 2009.
- Book Prize for Lincoln's Sword, Abraham Lincoln Institute, 2007.
- Lincoln Prize for Lincoln's Sword, Gilder Lehrman Institute of American History, 2007.
- Honorary Degree, Litt. D., Knox College, 2007.
- Residency, Rockefeller Foundation Study Center at Bellagio, 2004.
- Lincoln Diploma of Honor, Lincoln Memorial University, 2000.
- Lincoln Prize for Honor's Voice, Gettysburg College, 1999.
- Barondess/Lincoln Award, Civil War Roundtable of New York, 1999.
- Book Prize for Honor's Voice, Abraham Lincoln Institute, 1999.
- Research Fellowship, Massachusetts Historical Society, 1999.
- Book Prize for Herndon's Informants, Abraham Lincoln Institute, 1998.
- Award of Achievement, Lincoln Group of New York, 1998.
- Elected to membership, American Antiquarian Society, 1995.
- Fellowship, Huntington Library, 1981, 1991, 1992.
- Alumni Award for Distinguished Scholarship, Doane College, 1991.
- Outstanding Faculty Award, Knox College, 1991.
- Lester J. Cappon Research Associate, Newberry Library, 1985–86.
- Research grants, American Council of Learned Societies, 1981, 1985.
- Research Fellowship, National Endowment for the Humanities, 1982–83.
- Research grant, American Philosophical Society, 1980.

== Publications ==
=== Books ===
- Editor, The Genteel Tradition: Nine Essays by George Santayana. Harvard University Press, 1967.
- Edited with James Gilreath, Thomas Jefferson's Library: A Catalog with the Entries in His Own Order, Library of Congress, 1989.
- Editor, Jefferson's Literary Commonplace Book, The Papers of Thomas Jefferson. Second Series, Princeton University Press, 1989.
- Jefferson's Books, Monticello Monographs, 1996.
- Lincoln Before Washington: New Perspectives on the Illinois Years, University of Illinois Press, 1997.
- Editor, Monticello: A Guide Book. Thomas Jefferson Foundation, 1997.
- Honor's Voice: The Transformation of Abraham Lincoln. Alfred A. Knopf, 1998. Awarded Lincoln Prize.
- Edited with Rodney O. Davis, Herndon's Informants: Letters, Interviews, and Statements about Abraham Lincoln. University of Illinois Press, 1998.
- Edited with Lucia Stanton, Jefferson Abroad. The Modern Library, 1999.
- Editor with Rodney O. Davis, Herndon's Lincoln, University of Illinois Press, 2006.
- Lincoln's Sword: The Presidency and the Power of Words. Alfred A. Knopf, 2006. Awarded Lincoln Prize.
- Edited with Rodney O. Davis, The Lincoln-Douglas Debates: The Lincoln Studies Center Edition, University of Illinois Press, 2008.
- Editor with Rodney O. Davis, Herndon on Lincoln: Letters, University of Illinois Press, 2016.
- Editor with Rodney O. Davis, Lincoln's Confidant: The Life of Noah Brooks, by Wayne C. Temple, University of Illinois Press, 2019.

=== Articles ===
- "The Other Side of the Wall" (on Robert Frost's "Mending Wall"), The Iowa Review, 10:1 (Winter 1979), 65–75.
- "The American Agricola: Jefferson's Agrarianism and the Classical Tradition," South Atlantic Quarterly 80.3 (1981): 339–54.
- "Sowerby Revisited: The Unfinished Catalogue of Jefferson's Library," William and Mary Quarterly 3rd Series, XLI (1984): 615–28.
- "Thomas Jefferson's Early Notebooks," William and Mary Quarterly 3rd Series, XLII (1985): 433–52.
- "Jefferson's Library," in Thomas Jefferson: A Research Biography. Edited by Merrill D. Peterson. Charles Scribner's Sons (1986): 157–79.
- "The Fate of Jefferson's Farmer," North Dakota Quarterly, 56.4 (1988): 23–34.
- "Jefferson vs. Hume," William and Mary Quarterly 3rd Series, XLVI (1989): 49–70.
- "Thomas Jefferson and the Legacy of a National Library", Wilson Library Bulletin, 64:6 (February 1990), 37–41.
- "Abraham Lincoln, Ann Rutledge, and the Evidence of Herndon's Informants," Civil War History, 36.4 (1990): 301–24.
- "What Jefferson and Lincoln Read", The Atlantic Monthly, 267.1 (1991): 51–62.
- "Abraham Lincoln's Indiana and the Spirit of Mortal," Indiana Magazine of History LXXXVII.2 (1991): 155–70.
- "Abraham Lincoln and 'that fatal first of January'", Civil War History, 38:2 (June 1992), 101–130.
- "Thomas Jefferson and the Character Issue", The Atlantic Monthly, 270:5 (1992): 57–74.
- "Dating Jefferson's Early Architectural Drawings", Virginia Magazine of History and Biography, 101:1 (January 1993), 53–76.
- "Abraham Lincoln and 'that fatal first of January,'" Civil War History 38.2 (1992): 101–130.
- "Thomas Jefferson's Library and the Skipwith List," Harvard Library Bulletin New Series 3.4 (1992–93): 56–72.
- "William H. Herndon and his Lincoln Informants," Journal of the Abraham Lincoln Association 14.1 (1993): 15–34.
- "Jefferson and the Republic of Letters, " in Jeffersonian Legacies, edited by Peter S. Onuf. University Press of Virginia (1993): 50–76.
- "Thomas Jefferson's Library and the French Connection", Eighteenth-Century Studies, 26:4 (Summer 1993), 669–85.
- "Editing Herndon's Informants," The Lincoln Herald 95.4 (1993 [1994]): 115–23.
- "William H. Herndon and the 'Necessary Truth,'" in Abraham Lincoln in the American Mind: Papers from the Eighth Annual Lincoln Colloquium ed. Linda Norbut Suits and George Painter. Lincoln Home National Historic Site (1994): 31–41.
- "A Most Abandoned Hypocrite" [unrecorded Lincoln satire], American Heritage 45.1 (1994): 36–49.
- "The Unfinished Text of the Lincoln-Douglas Debates," Journal of the Abraham Lincoln Association 15.1 (1994): 70–84.
- "Lincoln's Affair of Honor," The Atlantic Monthly 281.2 (1998) 64–71.
- "Lincoln and Lovejoy," "We Cannot Escape History": Papers from the Eleventh Annual Lincoln Colloquium ed. Linda Norbut Suits and Timothy P. Townsend. Lincoln Home National Historic Site, 1999.
- "Jefferson and Literacy," in Thomas Jefferson and the Education of a Citizen, ed. James Gilreath. Library of Congress (1999): 79–90.
- "Keeping Lincoln's Secrets," The Atlantic Monthly 285.5 (2000): 78–88.
- "Collaborating with the Past: Remarks on Being Awarded the Lincoln Prize," in Accepting the Lincoln Prize: Two Historians Speak (2000): 39–56, (Gettysburg College).
- "William H. Herndon and Mary Todd Lincoln," Journal of the Abraham Lincoln Association 22.2 (2001): 1–26.
- "Young Man Lincoln," in The Lincoln Enigma: The Changing Faces of an American Icon ed. Gabor Boritt. Oxford University Press (2001): 20–35.
- "A Note on the Text of Lincoln's Second Inaugural," Documentary Editing 24.2 (2002): 37–41
- "The Evolution of Jefferson's Notes on the State of Virginia," Virginia Magazine of History and Biography 112.2 (2004): 99–133.
- "Herndon’s Dilemma: Abraham Lincoln and the Privacy Issue," Lincoln Lore 1877 (2004): 2–10.
- "Lincoln and Lovejoy," "We Cannot Escape History": Papers from the Eleventh Annual Lincoln Colloquium ed. Linda Norbut Suits and Timothy P. Townsend. Lincoln Home National Historic Site, 1999.
- "Lincoln and Abolition," History Now Issue 6, (online), 2005.
- "They Said He was a Lousy Speaker," Special Lincoln Issue, Time (July 4, 2005), 68–69.
- "Lincoln the Persuader," The American Scholar 74.4 (2006): 31–43.
- Interview on Lincoln scholarship, Lincoln Lore 1885 (2006): 2–6.
- "Terrific in Denunciation", Humanities: The Magazine of the National Endowment for the Humanities 29.1 (2008): 16–20.
- "Presidential Biographies." Bookmarks Magazine 34, 16 (May/June, 2008)
- "Groundwork for Greatness: Abraham Lincoln to 1854," Abraham Lincoln: A Legacy for Freedom, U.S. Department of State, 2008.
- "Reflections on Lincoln and English Studies," College English, 72:2 (December 2009), 156–57.
- "Prospects for Lincoln 2.5," Journal of American History, 96:2 (September 2009), 1–3.
- "Reflections on Lincoln and English Studies," College English, 72:2 (December 2009), 156–57.
- "Abraham Lincoln and the Shaping of Public Opinion," in Lincoln's Legacy of Leadership, ed. George R. Goethals and Gary L. McDowell, 2010.
- "The Once and Future Gettysburg Address," Long Remembered: Lincoln and His Five Versions of the Gettysburg Address, Commentary by Lloyd A. Dunlap, David C. Mearns, John R. Sellers, and Douglas L. Wilson (Library of Congress in Association with the Levenger Press, 2011), 87–94, 109–12.
- "His Hour Upon the Stage," The American Scholar (Winter 2012), 60–69.
- "'Public Opinion is Everything:' Lincoln the Communicator," in Lincoln: A President for the Ages, ed. Karl Weber (New York: Public Affairs, 2012), 183–95.
- "The Power of the Negative," The Wall Street Journal, Jan. 17, 2013.
- "Lincoln's Rhetoric," Journal of the Abraham Lincoln Association, 34:1 (Winter 2013), 1–17.
- "Lincoln Answers His Critics," New York Times, June 12, 2013.
- "William H. Herndon on Lincoln's Fatalism," Journal of the Abraham Lincoln Association, 35:2 (Summer 2014), 1–17.
- "Nothing Equals Macbeth: Notes on Lincoln's Fatal Attraction," in Nation and World, Church and God: The Legacy of Garry Wills, ed. Kenneth L. Vaux and Melanie Baffes, Evanston, Ill.: Northwestern University Press, 2014, 83–99.
- "A Book to Remember," The American Scholar, Online edition, Jan. 26, 2015.
- "Lincoln through the Lens of History: An Interview with Douglas L. Wilson," Lincoln Lore, No. 1914 (Spring 2017).

== Lectures and papers ==
- "Thomas Jefferson's Library and the French Connection," Symposium on "Publishing and Readership in Revolutionary France and America," Library of Congress, May 2–3, 1989.
- "Herndon and His Lincoln Informants," Abraham Lincoln Association Symposium, Old State Capitol, Springfield, Illinois, February 12, 1991.
- "Thomas Jefferson: The Man Who Couldn't Live Without Books," Jefferson Commemorative National Lecture Series. Delivered at American Antiquarian Society, Worcester, MA; The Newberry Library, Chicago, IL; The Florida Center for the Book, Ft. Lauderdale, FL.
- "Jefferson and Literacy," Library of Congress Research Conference: "Thomas Jefferson and Citizenship," May 13–15, 1993.
- "Jefferson and Learning," 200th anniversary of Jefferson's presidency of the American Philosophical Society, American Philosophical Society, June 18, 1997.
- "Herndon's Dilemma: Abraham Lincoln and the Privacy Issue," McMurtry Lecture, Lincoln Museum, Fort Wayne, Indiana, September 19, 1998.
- "The Young Abraham Lincoln," Books and Beyond Series, Library of Congress, February 24, 1998.
- "Young Man Lincoln," Gettysburg College, Sept. 9, 1999.
- "Honor's Voice," Gilder Lehrman Institute History Forum, Pierpont Morgan Library, March 8, 1999.
- "William H. Herndon and Mary Todd Lincoln," Abraham Lincoln Institute of the Mid-Atlantic, Library of Congress, March 25, 2001.
- "Lincoln's Sword," Lincoln Colloquium, Galesburg, IL, September 28, 2002.
- "Jefferson's Library," Lecture, Boston Athenaeum, 2005.
- "The Art of Presidential Writing," Abraham Lincoln Institute Symposium, Broadcast and Webcast, C-SPAN, 2007.
- "Books and Beyond." Library of Congress, Webcast, Library of Congress Web site, 2007.
- "Reconsidering Herndon," Lincoln Forum, 2007.
- "President Lincoln's Hidden Assets," Hoover Institution, Stanford University, 2007.
- "The Importance of Writing in Lincoln's Intellectual Foundation," Lincoln Shrine, Redlands, CA, 2007.
- "Lincoln as a Writer," National Book Festival, Broadcast and Webcast, C-SPAN, Washington, DC, 2007.
- "Lincoln's Rhetoric," Abraham Lincoln Symposium, Springfield, IL, February 11–12, 2008.
- "Abraham Lincoln," Aspen Institute, Webcast FORA.TV, 2008.
- "Abraham Lincoln and his Legacy: From Emancipation to Barack Obama," Lecture Tour, People's Republic of China, sponsored by the U. S. State Department, September 14–30, 2009.
- "Words Fitly Spoken: Lincoln and Language," Library of Congress Bicentennial Symposium, March 4, 2009.
