= Nicolay and Hay =

Nicolay and Hay refers to John G. Nicolay and John Hay jointly. Nicolay and Hay were friends from an early age. In 1860 they were selected as personal secretary and assistant secretary, respectively, to President Abraham Lincoln of the United States, and served throughout his presidency. Each of them became notable in his own right as both went on to other offices, Hay later serving as U.S. Secretary of State. The collective term "Nicolay and Hay" usually refers to them as co-authors of the ten-volume Abraham Lincoln: A History, one of the earliest and most important comprehensive biographies of Abraham Lincoln. The term is also used as shorthand when citing the biography itself. Nicolay and Hay also co-edited Lincoln's Complete Works.

== See also ==
- John G. Nicolay
- John Hay
