= Abe Lincoln in Illinois (film) =

1940 film by John Cromwell

- Theatrical release poster
- Directed by: John Cromwell
- Written by: Grover Jones
- Screenplay by: Robert E. Sherwood
- Based on: Abe Lincoln in Illinois; 1938 play by Robert E. Sherwood
- Produced by: Max Gordon
- Starring: Raymond Massey; Gene Lockhart; Ruth Gordon; Mary Howard; Minor Watson; Alan Baxter
- Cinematography: James Wong Howe
- Edited by: George Hively
- Music by: Roy Webb
- Production company: RKO Radio Pictures
- Distributed by: RKO Radio Pictures
- Release date: January 22, 1940
- Running time: 110 minutes
- Country: United States
- Language: English
- Budget: $1,004,000
- Box office: $666,000

Abe Lincoln in Illinois is a 1940 biographical-drama film that depicts the life of Abraham Lincoln from his departure from his father's Decatur, Illinois farm until his election as president of the United States. In the UK, the film is known by the alternate title Spirit of the People. The film was adapted by Grover Jones and Robert E. Sherwood from Sherwood's 1938 Pulitzer Prize-winning play of the same name. It was directed by John Cromwell.

The film stars Raymond Massey and Howard da Silva, who reprised their roles from the original Broadway production of Abe Lincoln in Illinois, playing Abe Lincoln and Jack Armstrong respectively. Herbert Rudley, who had portrayed Seth Gale in the play, also repeated his role in the film version. The film also marks the screen debut of Ruth Gordon in the role of Mary Todd Lincoln.

The film received Academy Award nominations for Best Actor in a Leading Role (Raymond Massey) and Best Cinematography, Black-and-White (James Wong Howe).

== Plot ==
Abraham Lincoln leaves home for the first time, having been hired along with two of his friends by Denton Offutt to take a load of pigs by water to New Orleans. When the boat becomes stuck at a dam at the settlement of New Salem, Abe sees and loses his heart to Ann Rutledge, the daughter of the local tavern keeper. When Denton later offers him a job at his store in New Salem, Abe readily accepts.

Abe discovers that Ann already has a beau. However, he makes himself the most popular man in town with his ready, good-natured humor. He takes lessons from schoolteacher Mentor Graham. When Abe's rival for Ann's affections leaves to improve himself, Ann waits for the man for two years before receiving a letter stating that the man does not know when he will return. Abe seizes the opportunity to express his love for Ann, but she is unsure of her feelings for him and asks for some time. She soon dies from "brain fever", telling Abe on her deathbed that she could have loved him.

Abe is asked to run for the Illinois General Assembly. He reluctantly accepts and wins, but after his first term in Springfield, he decides to study the law. When Mary Todd visits her sister Elizabeth Edwards and her wealthy, influential husband Ninian, a party is held in her honor. All of the eligible bachelors come, including Stephen Douglas, Abe's fiercest political rival. However, it is the homely, unpolished Abe who catches Mary's fancy, much to her sister's chagrin. The ambitious Mary senses greatness in him, and she is determined to drive him to his rightful destiny despite his lack of ambition. Abe proposes marriage but changes his mind at the last minute, discomfited by her drive, and he leaves town. After reflection, he proposes again, and Mary accepts. Years pass, and they have several children.

Lincoln runs for a seat in the U.S, Senate and engages in a series of debates with Stephen Douglas, the opposing candidate, during which the main issue is slavery. In a stirring speech, Abe contends that "a house divided against itself cannot stand."

With a presidential election looming, Abe's party is so split that the favorites are unacceptable to all. The party leaders compromise on dark-horse candidate Lincoln. He is opposed by three other candidates, including Douglas. Abe wins the election, bids his friends goodbye and boards the train for Washington, D.C.

== Cast ==
- Raymond Massey as Abraham Lincoln
- Gene Lockhart as Stephen Douglas
- Ruth Gordon as Mary Todd Lincoln
- Mary Howard as Ann Rutledge
- Minor Watson as Joshua Speed
- Alan Baxter as Billy Herndon
- Harvey Stephens as Ninian Edwards
- Howard da Silva as Jack Armstrong
- Dorothy Tree as Elizabeth Edwards
- Aldrich Bowker as Judge Bowling Green
- Maurice Murphy as John McNeil
- Louis Jean Heydt as Mentor Graham
- Clem Bevans as Ben Mattling
- Harlan Briggs as Denton Offut
- Herbert Rudley as Seth Gale
- Andy Clyde as Stage Driver
- Roger Imhof as Mr. Crimmin
- Edmund Elton as Mr. Rutledge
- Leona Roberts as Mrs. Rutledge
- Florence Roberts as Mrs. Bowling Green
- George Rosener as Dr. Chandler
- Trevor Bardette as John Hanks
- Syd Saylor as John Johnston
- Elisabeth Risdon as Sarah Lincoln
- Charles Middleton as Tom Lincoln
- Alec Craig as Trum Cogdall
- Erville Alderson as Stonewall Jackson (uncredited)
- Henry Blair as Tad Lincoln (uncredited)
- Sonny Bupp as Willie Lincoln (uncredited)
- John Cromwell as John Brown (uncredited)
- Harry Humphries as Daniel Webster (uncredited)
- George Irving as Robert E. Lee (uncredited)
- Edwin Mills as Robert Todd Lincoln (uncredited)
- Ian Wolfe as Horace Greeley (uncredited)
- Esther Dale as Lincoln's Cook (uncredited)

== Production ==
RKO paid "upwards of $175,000" for the play's film rights. Filming took place in Eugene, Oregon.

== Release ==
Abe Lincoln in Illinois had its elegant world premiere on January 22, 1940 at the RKO Keith in Washington D.C. with Eleanor Roosevelt as guest of honor.

== Reception ==
In a contemporary review for The New York Times, critic Frank S. Nugent called the film "a grand picture and a memorable biography of the greatest American of them all" and praised Massey's performance: "His Lincoln has acquired, with constant usage of the role, a mellowness, an evenness, an assurance that make the character seem less put on than foreordained by nature and by art. He looks the part, he is the man, he speaks the lines as Lincoln must have spoken them, or should have spoken them. We recognize that it is unfair to take performance for granted, but that will be Mr. Massey's fate: you will simply think of him as Lincoln."

The film recorded an ultimate loss of $740,000, making it one of the greatest financial disasters in RKO's history. However, in the states of Illinois and Indiana, where the film was heavily promoted, it became the highest-grossing film in most theaters. Nationwide, it lost attendance to a number of successful films such as Rebecca, Foreign Correspondent, Pinocchio, The Grapes of Wrath, Fantasia, The Sea Hawk, Our Town, Santa Fe Trail, The Letter, Northwest Passage and Pride and Prejudice.

== Adaptations to other media ==
Abe Lincoln in Illinois was dramatized as an hour-long radio play on a broadcast of Lux Radio Theater on April 22, 1940, again starring Raymond Massey as Lincoln. It also was adapted in a broadcast from the Ford Theatre on February 8, 1948.
