= Abe (musical) =

- The Musical
- Theatre in the Park production poster
- Music: Roger Anderson
- Lyrics: Lee Goldsmith
- Book: Lee Goldsmith
- Basis: Abraham Lincoln
- Productions: 2009 Premiere: Muddy River Opera, Quincy, IL; 2009 Theatre in the Park, New Salem, IL

Abe is a musical in two acts based on the life of President Abraham Lincoln with book & lyrics by Lee Goldsmith, music by Roger Anderson and orchestration by Greg Anthony. The musical covers the life of Abraham Lincoln from his earliest attempts at self-improvement through the 1860 election which made him the 16th president of an already fracturing United States. Also explored is Lincoln's youth as a flatboat pilot on the Mississippi, his early love for Ann Rutledge, his troubled marriage to the difficult and mentally fragile Mary Todd, and his attempt to be a good father to his sons.

== Premiere ==
During the 2009 Lincoln Bicentennial Year, Muddy River Opera Company in Quincy, Illinois (a city which hosted one of the historic Lincoln-Douglas debates) produced the World Premiere of Abe. The production team included stage director Mark Meier, musical director/conductor Scott Schoonover and choreographer Drew Quintero. In advance of the work's premiere on February 20, publishing house Samuel French added Abe to its catalog of dramatic works.

Theatre in the Park of New Salem, Illinois, mounted a second production at the New Salem State Historic Site that same year as part of its season celebrating Lincoln and the Civil War Era.

=== Recognition ===
The Lincoln Bicentennial Commission recognized the creative team of Abe along with a select group of artists inspired by Lincoln's life. The Hannibal Courier-Post cited the musical as "an entertaining evening, merging history and insight into the personalities of people in Lincoln’s life."

== Principal Roles ==
| Role | Voice type | Premiere Cast, February 20, 2009 |
|---|---|---|
| Abe Lincoln | Baritone | Samuel Hepler |
| Mentor Graham | Baritone | Greg Lewis |
| Ann Rutledge | Soprano | Elise LaBarge |
| Mary Todd | Mezzo-soprano | Joy Boland |
| Billy Herndon | Tenor | Robert Boldin |

Other roles include: Jim Rutledge, Denton Offutt, Jack Armstrong, Mrs. Cameron, Elizabeth Edwards, and Lincoln's sons Robert, Willie and Tad.

== Synopsis & Musical Numbers ==
Place: Illinois.
Time: 1800s.

=== Act One ===
Scene 1 (Prelude)
In 1829 New Orleans a nineteen-year-old Abe Lincoln witnesses a slave auction.

Scene 2
Three years later Abe is working as a store clerk in the struggling river town of New Salem, Illinois (Fifteen Houses). Abe feels close to the tavern owner's daughter, Ann Rutledge, and tells her of his origins (Hardin County, Kentucky). He also finds a friend and tutor in Mentor Graham, the town schoolteacher.

Scene 3
Visiting the Rutledge tavern one night, Abe realizes that he has fallen in love with Ann (A Girl Like Her) yet cannot imagine her ever returning his feelings. Abe is challenged to wrestle by one of the town's bullies and surprises everyone by pinning the challenger to the tavern floor. In order to make peace with his customers, Jim Rutledge buys everyone a round of drinks (Corn).

Scene 4
Abe has become a voracious reader and particularly taken with Blackstone's Commentaries on the Laws of England. Though many people in New Salem recognize his brilliance, Abe struggles to find his purpose (Who Are You?). Ignoring Abe's insecurity, Ann can't help but fall in love with someone she so admires (A Man Like Him).

Scene 5
Since the store where he worked is out of business, Abe takes the townspeople's suggestion and runs for the Illinois Legislature. Though he's defeated, Abe carries nearly all of New Salem's votes (277 to 3).

Scene 6
Three years later, Abe is now an Illinois legislator and visits New Salem to ask for Ann's hand. She accepts but wishes to wait until Abe has finished his law degree (A Girl Like Her reprise).

Scene 7
Three months later Ann is dead; Abe suffers a bout of melancholy that darkens the rest of his life.

Scene 8
Five years pass and Abe is still in the State Legislature while running a successful law practice. Attending a Cotillion Ball Abe is pursued by Mary Todd, a visitor from Kentucky. Mary envisions Abe's great political future, which she intends to cultivate and become part of (Mrs. Abraham Lincoln). Abe's friend and colleague, Billy Herndon, a staunch abolitionist, introduces a game to the Cotillion guests (What Am I Bid?). The seemingly innocent entertainment turns into a riot, underscoring the slavery conflict that is consuming the nation.

=== Act Two ===
Scene 1
Though Mary continues to pursue Abe, her family believes the match is not suitable. Abe proposes to her in December 1840 and agrees to a New Year's Day wedding, but never appears. Mary remains steadfast in her hopes; two years later they are finally wed (Mrs. Abraham Lincoln reprise).

Scene 2
Elected to one term in the United States House of Representatives in 1846, Abe finds it impossible, despite attempts from family and friends, to compromise his ideals (Someone).

Scene 3
Years later Abe and Mary with their sons Bob, Willie and Tad celebrate Christmas Eve. Tad, the youngest, questions his father how life would be different had one of the boys been a girl (What Would I Do With Daughters?). Soon after Mary criticizes Abe on the manner in which he treats her in public, but admits to being overly sensitive since he lost the election to the United States Senate the previous year. They discuss the good things they share in marriage and family (A Moment Like This One). Billy Herndon, now Abe's law partner, arrives with presents and news that Abe is in consideration for the presidential nomination of 1860. After he leaves, Mary launches into a tirade against Billy, revealing signs of emotional instability that will plague her for the rest of her life.

Scene 4
Abe visits the photography studio of Mathew Brady in February 1860 where he encounters a boy who has memorized his “House Divided” speech.

Scene 5
In May 1860 at Chicago's Convention Hall, Abe wins the nomination for President (Who Abe? You, Abe!).

Scene 6
In November, he is elected the 16th President of the United States of America.

Scene 7
On February 11, 1861, the Lincolns are packed and ready to leave for Washington, D.C. Abe finds himself left alone (Who Are You? reprise). Abe's oldest son Bob enters to say he has heard that the nation is coming apart and asks if his father can stop it. “I can try,” Abe responds. Alone again, Abe remembers Ann. Mary enters. Together, arm in arm, they leave for the train station.

== Sources ==
- Muddy River Opera Company Program
- Official Website of Abe
