= Abraham Lincoln's patent =

Invention to lift boats, by the President

Patent No. 6,469 for "Buoying Vessels Over Shoals"
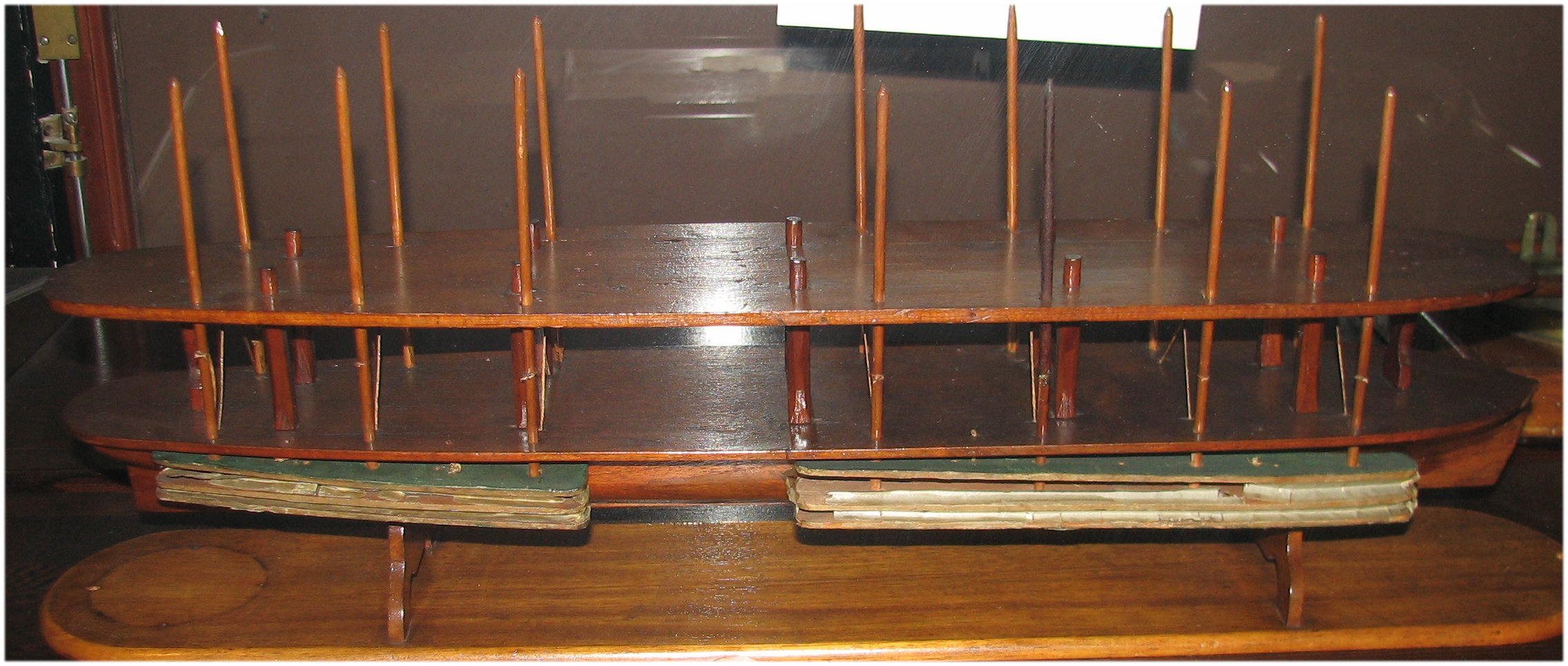
- Patent Model of Abraham Lincoln's invention at Smithsonian Institution
- Inventor: Abraham Lincoln
- Filing date: March 10, 1849
- Issue date: May 22, 1849
- Location: Illinois

Abraham Lincoln's patent relates to an invention to buoy and lift boats over shoals and obstructions in a river. Abraham Lincoln conceived the invention when on two occasions the boat on which he traveled got hung up on obstructions. Lincoln's device was composed of large bellows attached to the sides of a boat that were expandable due to air chambers. Filed on March 10, 1849, Lincoln's patent was issued as Patent No. 6,469 later that year, on May 22. His successful patent application led to his drafting and delivering two lectures on the subject of patents while he was president.

Lincoln was at times a patent attorney and was familiar with the patent application process as well as patent lawsuit proceedings. Among his notable patent law experiences as a result of his patent was litigation over the mechanical reaper; both he and his future Secretary of War, Edwin Stanton, provided counsel for John Henry Manny, an inventor. The original documentation of Lincoln's patent was rediscovered in 1997.

== Background ==
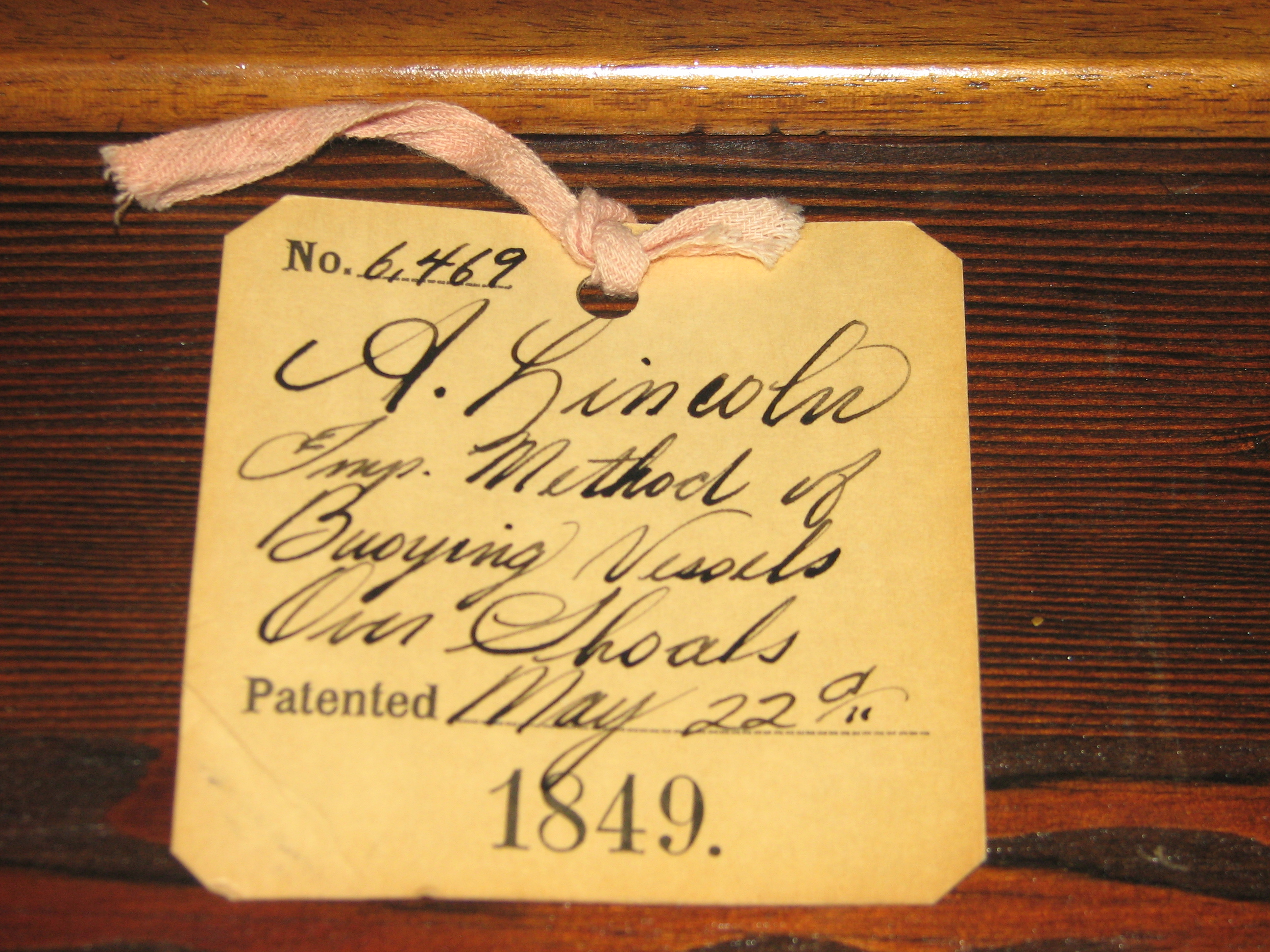
Lincoln's United States Patent, tag No. 6,469

The invention stemmed from Lincoln's experiences ferrying travelers and carrying freight on the Great Lakes and some midwestern rivers. In 1860, Lincoln wrote his autobiography and recounted that while in his late teens he took a flatboat down the Ohio and Mississippi Rivers from his home in Indiana to New Orleans while employed as a hired hand. The son of the boat owner kept him company and the two went out on this new undertaking without any other helpers.

Lincoln made an additional trip a few years later after moving to Macon County, Illinois, on another flatboat that went from Beardstown, Illinois, to New Orleans. John D. Johnston (Lincoln's stepbrother) and John Hanks were hired as additional laborers by Denton Offutt to take a flatboat of merchandise down the Sangamon River to New Orleans. Before Offutt's boat could reach the Illinois River, it got hung up on a milldam at the Old Sangamon town seven miles northwest of Springfield. Lincoln took action, unloading some cargo to right the boat, then drilling a hole in the bow with a large auger borrowed from the local cooperage. After the water drained, he replugged the hole. With local help, he then portaged the empty boat over the dam, and was able to complete the trip to New Orleans.

Lincoln started his political career in New Salem. Near the top of his agenda was improvement of navigation on the Sangamon River. Lincoln's law partner and biographer, William H. Herndon, also reports an additional incident in 1848: a boat Lincoln came to from his steamboat was stranded on a shoal. The boat's captain ordered his crew to gather together all the empty barrels, boxes, and loose planks and force these objects under the sides of the steamboat to buoy it over the shallow water. The boat gradually swung clear and was dislodged after much manual exertion. This event, along with the Offutt's boat/milldam incident, prompted Lincoln to start thinking about how to lift vessels over river obstructions and shoals. He eventually came up with an invention to achieve this, which involved flotation bladders.

== Patent ==
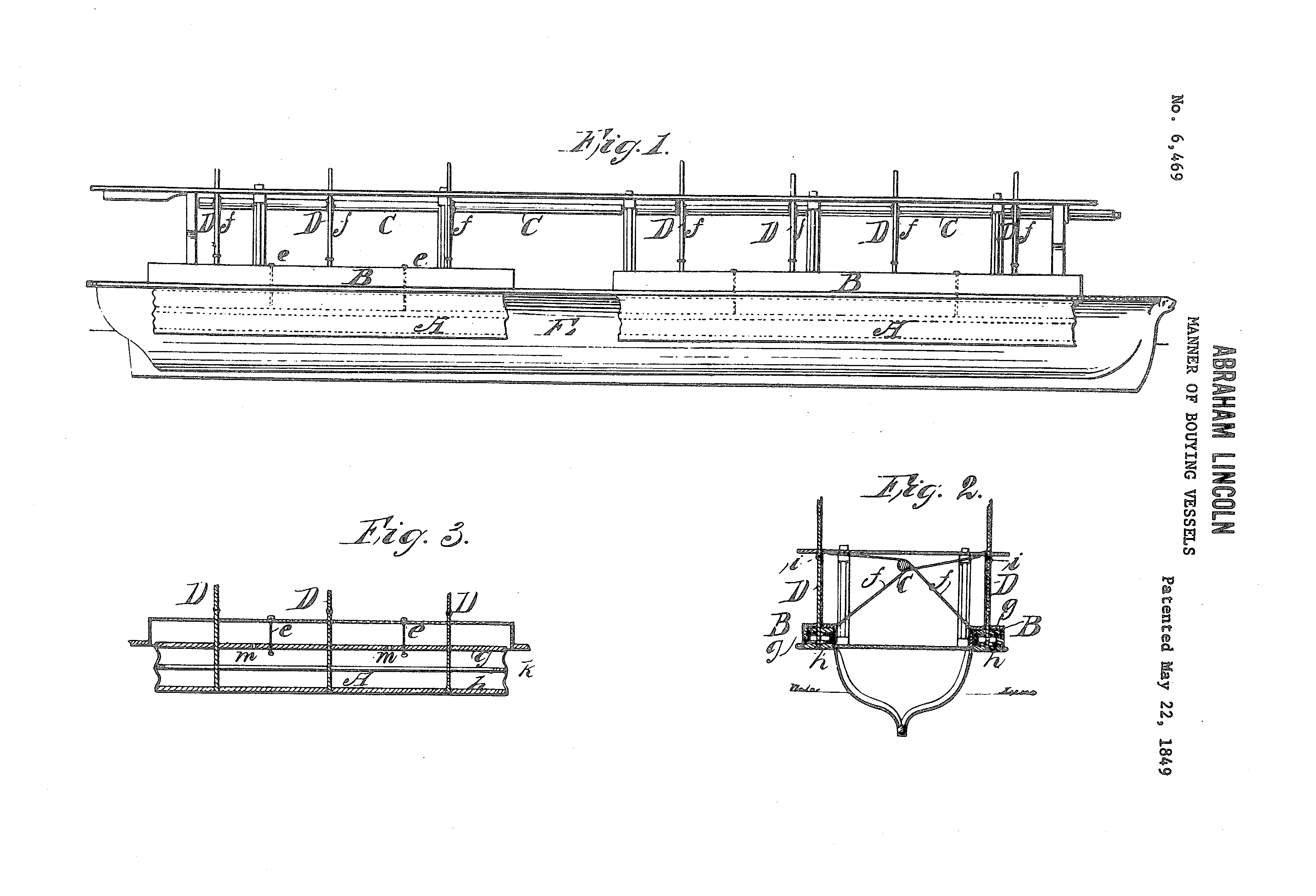
Lincoln's Patent drawings for Patent No. 6,469

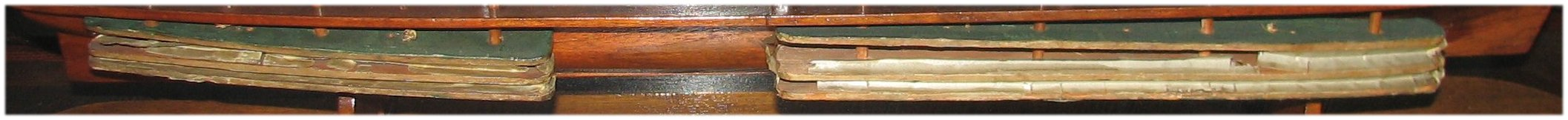
Lincoln's patent showing the expansible buoyancy air chambers, inflatable bellows to lift a boat over obstructions. The bellows are shown in a collapsed state taking up little space and positioned to protect them from harm.

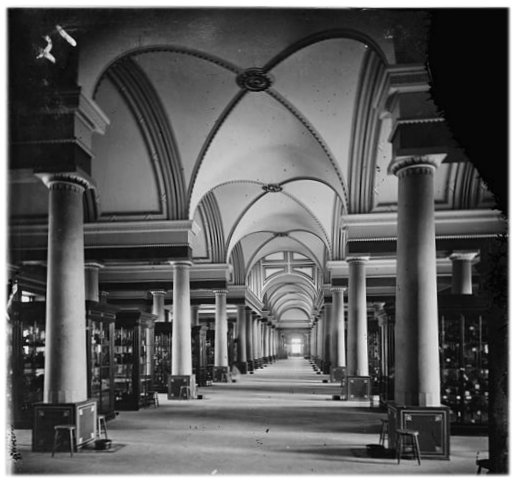
Patent Office model room in 1861

Lincoln labeled his invention Buoying Vessels Over Shoals and it was used to get them over shoals. He envisioned a system of waterproof fabric bladders that could be inflated when necessary to help ease a stuck steamboat over such obstacles. When crew members knew their ship was stuck, or at risk of hitting a shallow, Lincoln's invention could be activated, which would inflate accordion-shaped air chambers along the sides of the watercraft to lift it above the water's surface, providing enough clearance to avoid a disaster. As part of the research process, Lincoln designed a scale model of a ship outfitted with the device. This model (built and assembled with the assistance of a mechanic from Springfield named Walter Davis) that was originally taken to the United States Patent and Trademark Office in Washington is now on display at the Smithsonian Institution. At the time the patent was issued, Lincoln was a congressman. He is the only United States president to be a patentee.

After reporting to Washington for his two-year term in Congress beginning March 1847, Lincoln retained Zenas C. Robbins, patent attorney. Robbins most probably had drawings done by Robert Washington Fenwick, his apprentice artist. Robbins filed the application on March 10, 1849, which was granted as Patent No. 6,469 on May 22, 1849. Lincoln's patent is the result of Offutt's flat-boat experience he had back in 1831.

The device was never produced for practical use and there are doubts as to whether it would have actually worked. Paul Johnston, curator of the maritime history department at the Smithsonian, came to the conclusion that the version Lincoln made was not practical because it required too much force to make it operate as intended.

Lincoln took his four-year-old son, Robert Todd Lincoln, to the Old Patent Office Building in 1847 to the model room to view the displays, an episode that Robert later recalled as one of his fondest memories. Lincoln expressed a special affinity for the Patent Office, a large Greek Revival structure that still stands today.

== Legacy ==
Lincoln's exposure to the patent system, as an inventor and as a lawyer, engendered deep beliefs in its efficacy. Patent law in the United States has a constitutional foundation which is supported by the country's founders, and was viewed as an indispensable engine for economic development. It led him to draft and deliver two lectures on the subject when he was president. Lincoln had an attraction to machinelike accessories all his life, which some say was hereditary and handed down to him from his father's interest in labor-saving equipment. He made speeches on inventions before he became president. He said in 1858, "Man is not the only animal who labors; but he is the only one who improves his workmanship."

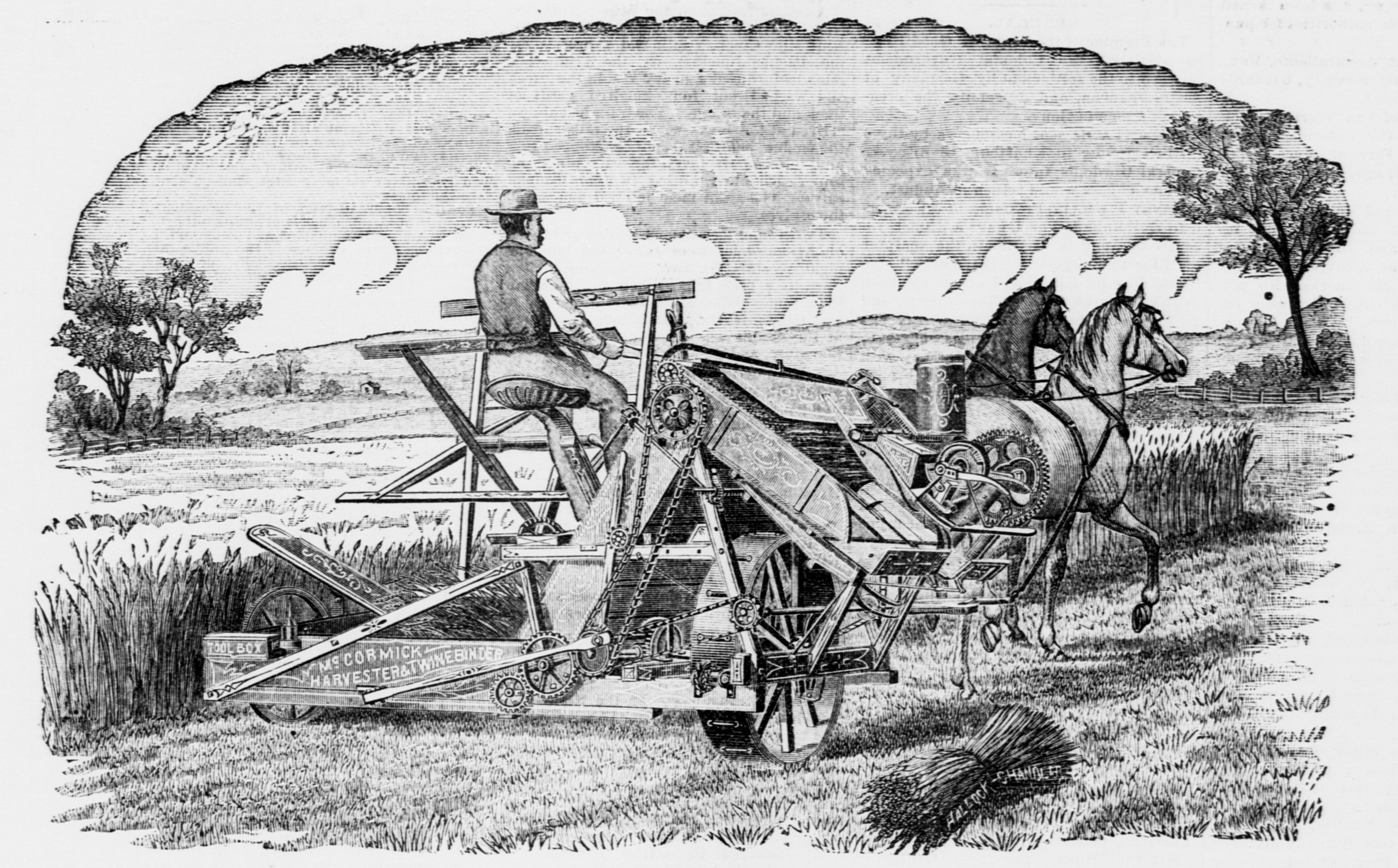
McCormick reaper and twine binder in 1884 that was part of McCormick Reaper patent case

Lincoln admired the patent law system because of the reciprocal benefits it furnished both the inventor and society. In 1859 he noted that the patent system ". . . has secured to the inventor, for a limited time, the exclusive use of his invention; and thereby added to the interest of genius in the discovery and production of new and useful things." He described the discovery of America as the most important development in the world's history, followed second by the technology of printing and third by patent laws.

Lincoln was himself a patent lawyer. He won an unreported patent infringement case for the defendant early in his legal career titled Parker v. Hoyt. A jury found that his client's waterwheel did not infringe the intellectual property rights of another. A large professional fee, one of his largest, came from working on the "Reaper Case" of McCormick v. Manny and being successful with its outcome. He was co-counsel for the defendant with two aggressive and preeminent Pennsylvania patent attorneys, George Harding, and Edwin M. Stanton. Although Lincoln was prepared and well-paid, his co-counsel thought him too naive and unsophisticated to be allowed to present the argument by himself. He went home unheard, however Manny won the case in an opinion authored by Supreme Court Justice John McLean. Upon Lincoln's taking office, he offered Harding the opportunity to become Commissioner of Patents, which was refused. He later offered the job and position of the United States Secretary of War to Stanton, who accepted and served. Lincoln's final patent case was Dawson v. Ennis. It occurred between his presidential nomination and the election. His electoral triumph was juxtaposed with a litigation loss for his client.

The original 1846 patent drawing was discovered in the Patent and Trademark Office of the director in 1997. Its only omission is the usually required inventor's signature in a lower corner. The Smithsonian Institution acquired about 10,000 patent models, including Lincoln's. The Engineering Collection includes about 75 maritime inventions; its Maritime Collections holds a replica, the original being deemed too delicate to loan out. The Smithsonian department of maritime history Historical Collections Department retains a duplicate of the original patent papers.

== Sources ==
- Clifford, John Herbert (1908). The Works of Abraham Lincoln, Volume 5. Fredericksburg, Virginia: Sergeant Kirkland's Museum and Historical Society. OCLC 963605728.
- Emerson, Jason (2009). Lincoln the Inventor. Chicago: Southern Illinois University Press. ISBN 978-0-472-03066-8.
- Federal Writers Project (1937). Washington, City and Capital. Washington, D.C.: United States Government Printing Office. OCLC 865798543.
- Herndon, William Henry (1892). Abraham Lincoln / True Story of Great Life. Los Angeles: University of California. OCLC 70836477.
- Mable, Hamilton Wright (2020). Heroes Every Child Should Know. Chicago: Good Press. OCLC 37447090.
- McCormick, Cyrus (1931). The Century of the Reaper : an Account of Cyrus Hall McCormick, the Inventor of the Reaper; of the McCormick Harvesting Machine Company, the Business He Created; and of the International Harvester Company, His Heir and Chief Memorial. New York: Houghton Mifflin Company. OCLC 807472363.
- McLean, John (1856). Reports of cases argued and decided in the circuit court, Volume 6. Cincinnati: H. W. Derby & Co. Publishers. OCLC 935049718.
