= Joseph Hanks =

Abraham Lincoln's great-grandfather

Joseph Hanks (1725 – 1793) was the maternal great-grandfather of United States President Abraham Lincoln. It is generally accepted that Joseph was the father of Lucy Hanks, the mother of Nancy Hanks Lincoln. There is also a theory that Joseph and his wife, Ann, had a son named James who married Lucy Shipley, sired Nancy Hanks, but died before Lucy and Nancy came to Kentucky.

Joseph Hanks' children and grandchildren figure prominently in Abraham Lincoln's youth.

== Biography ==
=== Early life and marriage ===
Joseph Hanks was born the second son of Catherine Hanks (died 1779) and John Hanks (1690s-1740) on December 20, 1725, in North Farnham Parish, Richmond County, Virginia. He was a tenant farmer and oversaw a plantation. Joseph and his family lived in Richmond County until 1782 when they moved to what was then Hampshire County, Virginia.

One theory about the Hanks family's westward movement (first to land that is now West Virginia) was that Joseph Hanks was concerned about his daughters' access to returning Revolutionary War soldiers in the "lax environment" following the war. There are also records that show that Joseph Hanks' mother, Catherine, died in 1779. Joseph, executor of the will, inherited monies from her estate and it was after this in 1781 that the Hanks moved from Northern Neck of Virginia to a place between the forks of Mike's Run off of Patterson's Creek in Hampshire County, Virginia (now Mineral County, West Virginia). The land there had just become available with "cheap prices," proper surveys, and clear titles.

==== Marriage and children ====
Joseph married Ann, also known as Nancy and Nannie. She was born about 1742 and died about 1794.

Joseph and Ann Hanks' children are:

- Thomas was born in 1759, served in the militia while in Hampshire County. When the family moved to Kentucky, he remained in Hampshire County until 1800 when he settled in Rose County, Ohio. He died February 6, 1834.
- Joshua was born about 1762 and died about 1835.
- William was born about 1765 and died about 1851 or 1852. He was father to Abraham Lincoln's "rail splitter", John Hanks. He was married to the Elizabeth Hall, Levi Hall's sister. He moved Illinois in 1826-1827 and in 1830 was a neighbor to Abraham Lincoln in Macon County, Illinois.
- Charles
- Joseph moved with the family in his youth, moved with his mother move to Virginia after the death of his father. He was raised by his older brother, either Joshua or Thomas, following his mother's death in 1794. In 1798 he moved to Kentucky and worked in an Elizabethtown carpentry shop where Thomas Lincoln also worked. He married Mary Young in 1810. He moved to Crawford County, Indiana, in 1815 and to 10 years later moved to Sangamon County, Illinois.
- Lucy, born about 1767, was the unwed mother of Nancy Hanks. She gave birth to Nancy in 1784, gave birth to Sarah Hanks about 1787 and married Henry Sparrow in 1791. Sarah Hanks gave birth to 6 illegitimate children, the eldest, Sophia Hanks was born in 1809, lived with her aunt Elizabeth and uncle Thomas Sparrow, and after their death in 1818 lived with the Thomas Lincoln family. Lucy had eight children with Henry Sparrow.
- Nancy, the unwed mother of Dennis Hanks, married Levi Hall.
- Elizabeth, nicknamed Betsey, was baptized May 4, 1771. She married Thomas Sparrow and raised Dennis and Nancy Hanks. Nancy was called Nancy Sparrow by her Hanks relatives.
- Polly married Jesse Friend.

=== Hampshire County ===
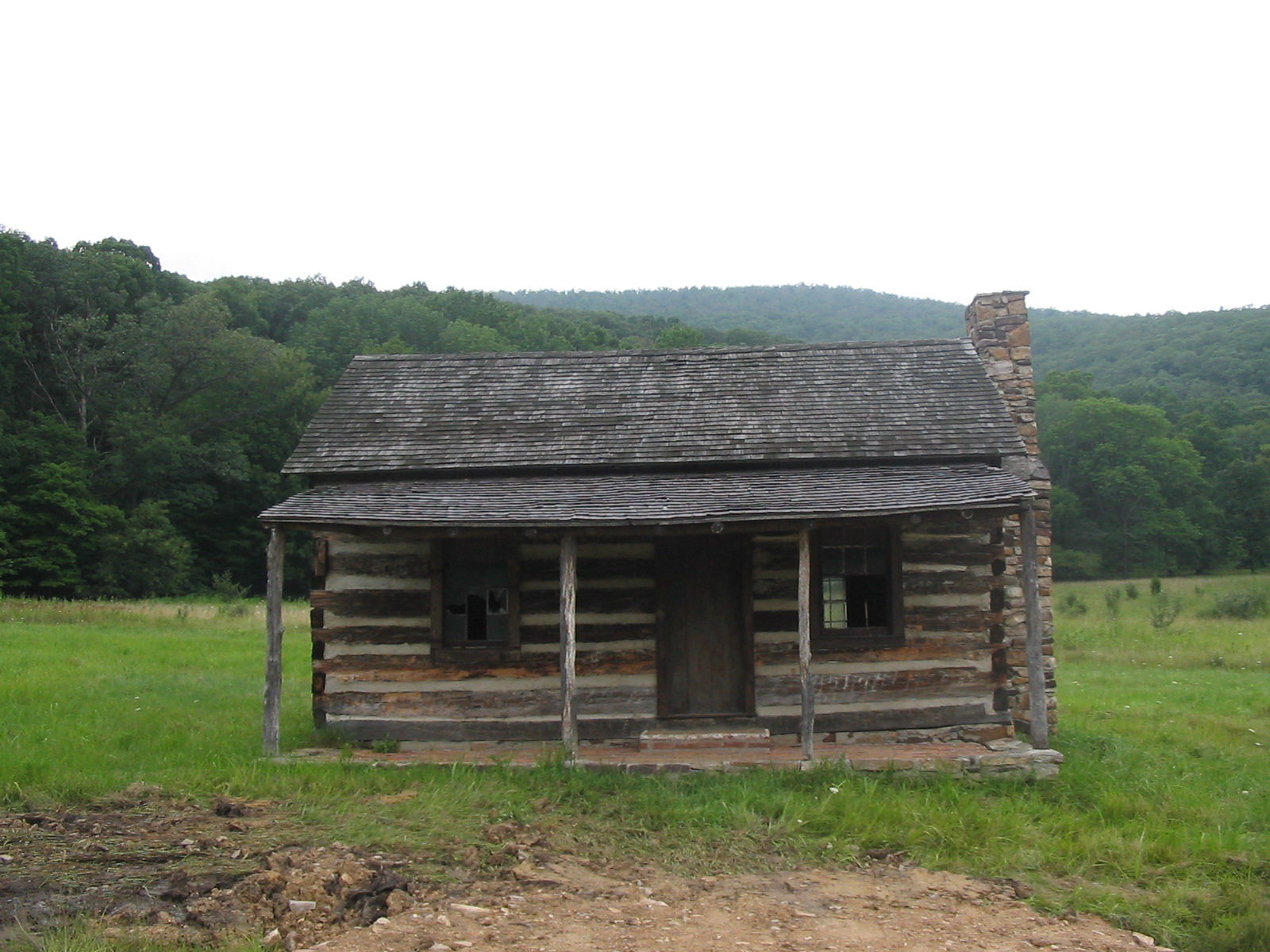
Replica of Joseph Hanks's cabin at Mike's Run in what is now Mineral County, West Virginia. The cabin was rebuilt in 1927 for the Nancy Hanks Memorial.

Joseph Hanks lived on 108 acres (44 ha) on a fork of Mike's Run, alongside Patterson Creek, Hampshire County, VA (now Mineral County, West Virginia). Joseph Hanks is on the 1782 census for Hampshire County, Virginia. The census showed that there were 11 white people living in the household. This would have included Joseph, Ann and his 9 children, including Lucy Hanks.

Joseph Hank's home, now in Mineral County, West Virginia, is considered Nancy Hanks's birthplace and contains a memorial to her from the state of West Virginia.

=== Kentucky ===
In March 1784, Joseph Hanks sold his property via a mortgage and moved with his wife, eight children, and granddaughter Nancy to Kentucky, having traveled on the Wilderness Road through Cumberland Gap. The family then lived on land purchased February 1787, about 2 miles north of the mouth of Pottinger's Creek and Rolling Fork, in a settlement called Rolling Fork or Pottinger's Creek settlement in Nelson County, Kentucky, until the death of patriarch Joseph Hanks in 1793.

Pottinger Station "Site of one of the forts which protected the early settlement of Bardstown. Built by Samuel Pottinger, soldier in Revolution, who first saw the land in 1778 which he came from Maryland with troops of Capt. James Harrod. In 1781, Pottinger returned with his family and built station. It was often used as a refuge for other settlers migrating to Kentucky.

A man named Zachariah Riney bought Nancy's grandfather, Joseph Hanks, Sr. property off of Rolling Fork in Kentucky. After Nancy and Thomas Lincoln were married and had children, Riney, with Caleb Hazel, taught Nancy's children at the Knob Creek school. The Hanks property purchased by Riney was situated "on the Rolling Fork [River] near the moth of Knob Creek and Pottinger's Creek" (just south and east of New Haven, Kentucky).

=== Death and will ===
Joseph Hanks died in 1793. Nancy's grandmother, also named Nancy but generally called Ann, decided to return to the homeland of her youth and much of her adulthood in old Farnham parish in Virginia.

His home and property were to be given to his wife during her lifetime and then their youngest son, Joseph Jr. In 1794, Nancy {"Ann"} and her son, Joseph Hanks Jr., sold the property along Rolling Fork near Pottinger's Creek to her son William. Ann then returned to the Farnham area in Virginia with Joseph and died there. William and his wife lived in the home and any unmarried children they were married. Joseph and Ann's grandchild, Nancy, went to live with her mother, Lucy Hanks Sparrow.

== Abraham Lincoln ==
Abraham Lincoln's great-grandparents are commonly believed to be Ann ("Nannie") and Joseph Hanks of North Farnham Parish, Richmond County, VA.

Joseph and Ann's children and grandchildren figured prominently in Abraham's life, including:

- Joseph's granddaughter, Nancy Hanks, was Lincoln's mother.
- His grandson, Dennis Hanks lived with Abraham Lincoln in Thomas Lincoln's home in Indiana.
- His daughter, Elizabeth ("Betsy") Hanks Sparrow assisted in the birth of Abraham Lincoln, lived near Abraham Lincoln in Kentucky and Indiana. She was known first to Abraham as "Granny", before he learned that in fact she was his aunt.
- His son, Joseph, is believed by some to have taught Thomas Lincoln the carpentry trade in Hardin County, Kentucky.
- His grandson, Abraham's cousin, John Hanks, lived in the Thomas Lincoln household, took a raft trip with Abraham down the Ohio and Mississippi rivers, and encouraged the Thomas, Sarah and Abraham family and Dennis Hanks to move to Illinois. He was also his "rail splitting" partner, which became a focus for Lincoln's presidential campaign.
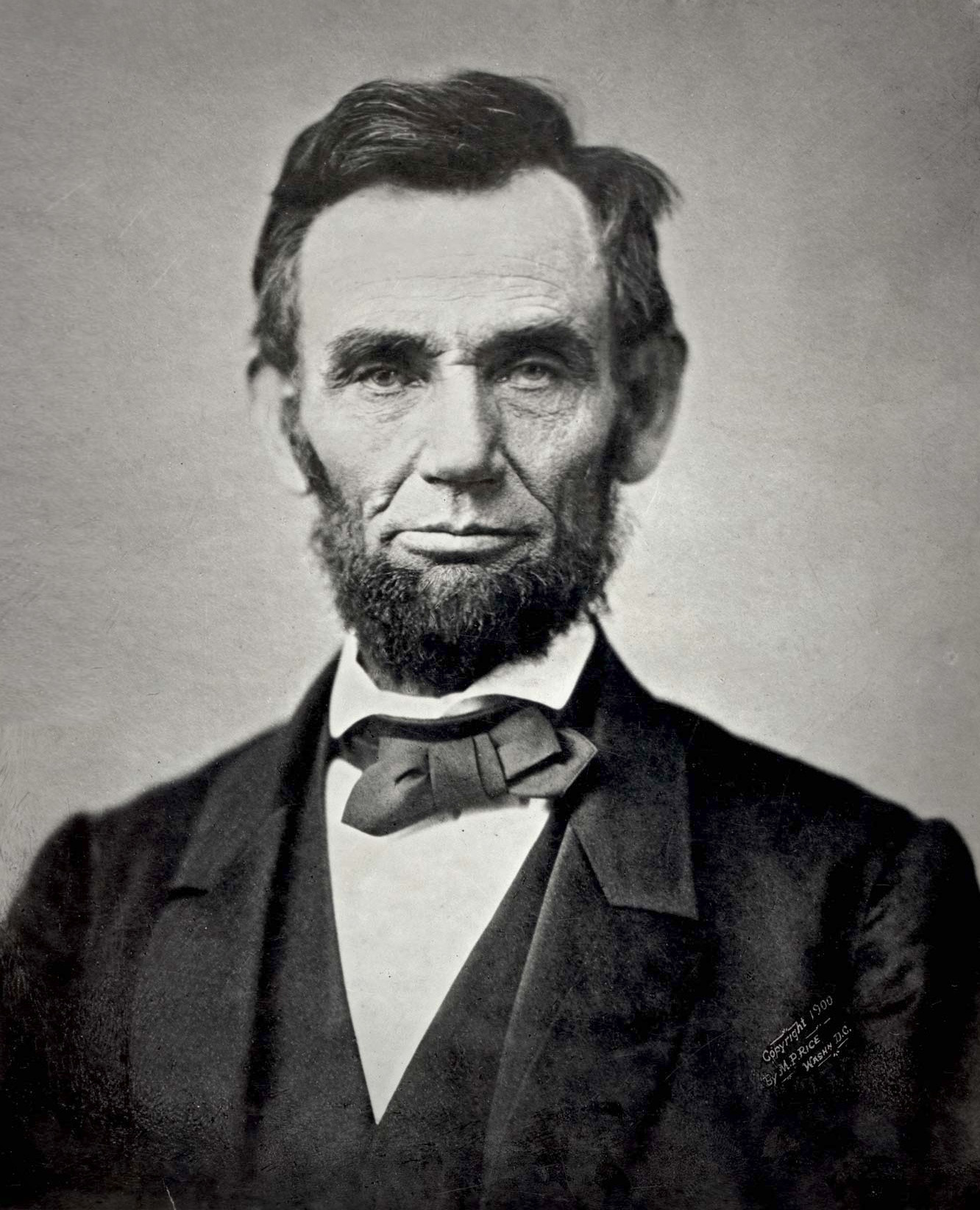
Daguerreotype of Abraham Lincoln at age 54, 1863

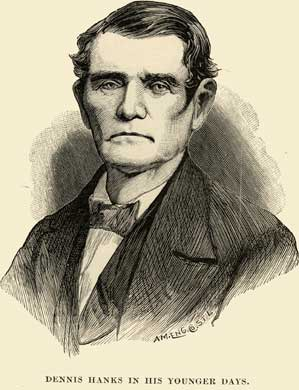
Dennis Hanks, cousin of Nancy Hanks Lincoln, in his younger days.

== See also ==
- Lincoln family tree
