= Freeport Doctrine =

1858 doctrine by Stephen A. Douglas

The Freeport Doctrine was articulated by Stephen A. Douglas on August 27, 1858, in Freeport, Illinois, at the second of the Lincoln–Douglas debates. Former one-term U.S. Representative Abraham Lincoln was campaigning to take Douglas's U.S. Senate seat by strongly opposing all attempts to expand the geographic area in which slavery was permitted. Lincoln tried to force Douglas to choose between the principle of popular sovereignty proposed by the Kansas-Nebraska Act (which left the fate of slavery in a U.S. territory up to its inhabitants), and the majority decision of the United States Supreme Court in the case of Dred Scott v. Sandford, which stated that slavery could not legally be excluded from U.S. territories (since Douglas professed great respect for Supreme Court decisions, and accused the Republicans of disrespecting the court, yet this aspect of the Dred Scott decision was contrary to Douglas's views and politically unpopular in Illinois). Douglas responded that, despite the court's ruling, slavery could be excluded from any territory by the refusal of the people living in that territory to pass laws favorable to slavery. Likewise, if the people of the territory supported slavery, legislation would provide for its continued existence.

Douglas's actual words were:

The next question propounded to me by Mr. Lincoln is, Can the people of a Territory in any lawful way, against the wishes of any citizen of the United States, exclude slavery from their limits prior to the formation of a State constitution? I answer emphatically, as Mr. Lincoln has heard me answer a hundred times from every stump in Illinois, that in my opinion the people of a Territory can, by lawful means, exclude slavery from their limits prior to the formation of a State constitution. Mr Lincoln knew that I had answered that question over and over again. He heard me argue the Nebraska bill on that principle all over the State in 1854, in 1855, and in 1856, and he has no excuse for pretending to be in doubt as to my position on that question. It matters not what way the Supreme Court may hereafter decide as to the abstract question whether slavery may or may not go into a Territory under the Constitution, the people have the lawful means to introduce it or exclude it as they please, for the reason that slavery cannot exist a day or an hour anywhere, unless it is supported by local police regulations. Those police regulations can only be established by the local legislature; and if the people are opposed to slavery, they will elect representatives to that body who will by unfriendly legislation effectually prevent the introduction of it into their midst. If, on the contrary, they are for it, their legislation will favor its extension. Hence, no matter what the decision of the Supreme Court may be on that abstract question, still the right of the people to make a Slave Territory or a Free Territory is perfect and complete under the Nebraska bill. I hope Mr. Lincoln deems my answer satisfactory on that point.

By taking this position, Douglas was defending his popular sovereignty or "Squatter Sovereignty" principle of 1854, which he considered to be a compromise between pro-slavery and anti-slavery positions. It was satisfactory to the legislature of Illinois, which reelected Douglas over Lincoln to the Senate. However, the Freeport Doctrine, or "Freeport Heresy" as Southern Democrats called it, alienated many of them. Douglas had actually stated the essence of the doctrine previous to the debate at Freeport, but its prominent public assertion at Freeport contributed (along with other political disputes, such as over the Lecompton Constitution) to antagonizing those in the Southern United States who were demanding ever-increasing protections for slavery. These Southerners subsequently insisted on the Congressional repudiation of the Freeport Doctrine (i.e., the passage of slave codes for the territories), in order to block Douglas's presidential bid in 1860. This led to the split of the Democratic party in 1860, and Douglas's loss in the 1860 presidential election.
