= Muddy River Opera Company =

US nonprofit arts organization

The Muddy River Opera Company was founded by Mary Anne Scott and Mary Jane McCloskey in 1989 in Quincy, Illinois, as a non-profit arts organization. The company was incorporated in 1990. Scott and McCloskey had two goals in mind: to make professional operatic performances and educational opportunities available to the tri-state area. In keeping with the mission of its founders, the company consistently produces two to four operas a year. For several years, most MROC productions of foreign-language operas were performed in English translation, though the company has, in recent years, mounted several productions of operas in the original language with projected English supertitles.

The company hires professional singers, directors, designers and musicians for every production. Auditions for roles in all productions take place in Quincy, St. Louis, Missouri, and Chicago, Illinois, prior to the beginning of every new season. The company also utilizes the Quincy community's impressive reserve of professional and amateur singers, musicians and artists.

== Major repertoire ==
MROC has produced both traditional and twentieth-century operas and operettas including: Die Zauberflöte, La bohème, Dialogues of the Carmelites, The Pirates of Penzance, The Merry Widow, Jonah, The Medium, La traviata, Die Fledermaus, Così fan tutte, Gianni Schicchi, Suor Angelica, Il barbiere di Siviglia, Rigoletto, HMS Pinafore, A Little Night Music, Carmen and L'Elisir d'Amore.

The company celebrated its 20th season with a May 2010 production of Puccini's Madama Butterfly, featuring Quincy native and international opera singer Michèle Crider as Cio-Cio San.

== Collaborations ==
The company collaborated with the Quincy Symphony Orchestra in producing Hansel and Gretel, Evita and Jekyll & Hyde. The Tender Land was also produced during the 1995 Copland Festival. In 2008, MROC presented Donizetti's L'Elisir d'Amore, a production shared with Elgin Opera and Union Avenue Opera.

== Premieres ==
In November 2002, MROC staged the Midwestern Premiere of David Conte's Gift of the Magi, an opera based on the O. Henry short story with a libretto by Nicholas Giardini.

As part of the 2009 Lincoln Bicentennial Year, MROC staged the World Premiere of Abe, a musical about the early life of President Abraham Lincoln with book and lyrics by Lee Goldsmith and music by Roger Anderson.

For the 2021 season, MROC produced the world premiere of Helen, a one-act adaptation of the second and third volumes of Anne Brontë's The Tenant of Wildfell Hall with music composed by Garrett Hope and libretto by Steven Soebbing.

== Children's educational outreach ==
Part of the company's mission is to educate local grade school students in Quincy, Adams County and Hannibal, Missouri about opera, singing and performance. Some past children's operas, performed in Quincy University's MacHugh Theatre, include The Mini Magic Flute, Alice in Opera Land, Noye's Fludde, The Toy Shop as well as works by Seymour Barab: Chanticleer and Little Red Riding Hood.
