= Union Avenue Opera =

Coordinates: 38.653967°N 90.273776°W

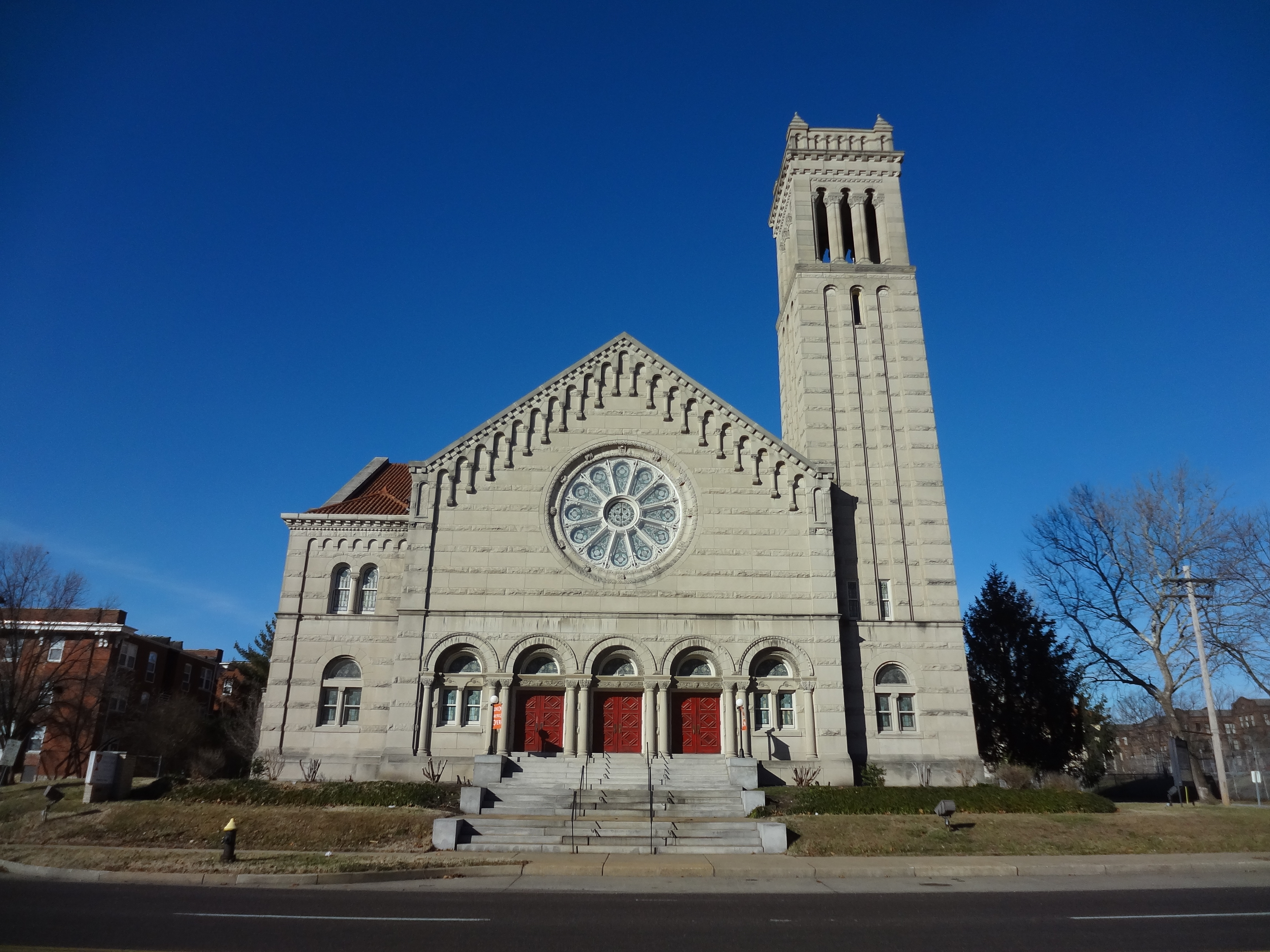
The venue for the Union Avenue Opera

Union Avenue Opera (previously Union Avenue Opera Theatre) is an opera company based in St. Louis, Missouri. The company was founded in 1994 by Scott Schoonover, the music director of Union Avenue Christian Church, which serves as the company's venue in St. Louis' Visitation Park neighborhood.

== Company history ==
In the summer of 1995, Scott Schoonover, with the support of the Arts Group of Union Avenue Christian Church and on a shoestring budget, mounted Union Avenue Opera Theatre's first production: Purcell’s Dido and Aeneas, and since that time UAOT became an integral part of the St. Louis arts community. After two seasons of smaller productions from lesser known operatic repertoire, Artistic Director and Principal Conductor Schoonover produced a full-scale production of Mozart's Le nozze di Figaro, sung in English, in 1998. This production spurred increased audience attendance as well as a growing donor base. Professional singers from beyond St. Louis took an interest in auditioning for the company as well, causing the company to expand its audition cities to Chicago, Kansas City, Los Angeles, San Francisco and New York City. Early seasons featured operas either in English or foreign language works sung in the vernacular. However, with its 2000 production of Giacomo Puccini's La bohème sung in Italian, Union Avenue Opera Theatre began its ongoing practice of presenting opera in the original language with projected English supertitles.

Between 1998 and 2003, Union Avenue Opera Theatre usually produced one to two full productions per summer along with a concert staging of an operetta. For the company's 10th season in 2004, Schoonover expanded the season to three full productions in the summer. It was also during this season that, as a nod to the company's inaugural season, Dido and Aeneas appeared once again in the repertory to critical acclaim.

In 2005, the company began offering off-season productions in October which focused on suspense-driven, "spooky" repertoire including Gian Carlo Menotti's The Medium, Benjamin Britten's The Turn of the Screw, Béla Bartók's Duke Bluebeard's Castle and Puccini's Il tabarro.

Schoonover also revealed major renovation plans between the company and Union Avenue Christian Church. In 2007 a new orchestra pit and expanded stage were constructed successfully completing UAO’s first capital campaign. This renovation coincided with major improvements to the church sanctuary.

That season marked the welcoming of guest conductor Kostis Protopapas, of Tulsa Opera, to conduct a double bill of Suor Angelica and Gianni Schicchi. Protopapas has since returned to conduct productions of Otello, Lakmé and La fille du régiment. Capping off the 2007 season, Union Avenue Opera collaborated with The Black Repertory Theater of St. Louis to present George Gershwin's Porgy and Bess in a staging by the Black Rep's founder and producing director Ron Himes. At the start of the 2008 season, Schoonover imported a production of Donizetti's L'Elisir d'Amore in 2008 as a shared production with Elgin Opera and Muddy River Opera Company. This production earned raves, and distinction as the most "Family-Friendly Opera" of the year, from the St. Louis Post-Dispatch.

In December 2009, UAO presented for the first time Menotti's Amahl and the Night Visitors. The company revived Amahl yearly as a holiday production through 2011. In recent years, Union Avenue Opera has been awarded grants from several organizations including the Missouri Arts Council, the St. Louis Regional Arts Commission, the Arts and Education Council and the Fox Associates Performing Arts Foundation. Union Avenue Opera's 2013 season will include Puccini's Manon Lescaut, Wagner's Die Walküre (in an adaptation by British composer Jonathan Dove) and Leonard Bernstein's Trouble in Tahiti.

== Notable productions and premieres ==
=== Dead Man Walking ===
In August 2011, Union Avenue Opera presented the Missouri premiere of Jake Heggie's Dead Man Walking to great critical acclaim. In conjunction with the production, UAO and Union Avenue Christian Church invited anti-death penalty activist Sr. Helen Prejean, CSJ to speak on the opera and her ministry. Prejean herself attended the opening night performance.

== Outreach ==
=== Children's opera ===
Union Avenue Opera manages Springboard St. Louis’ opera component with workshops, residencies and performances for elementary school children. For several school years, UAO performed Seymour Barab's Little Red Riding Hood and most recently Carmen and the Bull, which tells the story of Ferdinand the Bull set to musical themes in Bizet's Carmen.

=== Pre-production events ===
The company offers a variety of lectures and behind-the-scenes events in which patrons learn about upcoming productions, hear musical excerpts performed by UAO artists, listen to presentations, view costumes and tour sets in a relaxed atmosphere.

=== School matinee ===
Union Avenue Opera has presented matinees of Amahl and the Night Visitors free of charge to local area school groups. The first ever matinee was underwritten by the Fox Charitable Performing Arts Foundation and the Boeing Employee Community Fund.

== Repertory ==
- 1995
  - Dido and Aeneas (Purcell)
- 1996
  - Il Combattimento di Tancredi e Clorinda (Monteverdi)
  - The Little Sweep (Britten)
  - Venus and Adonis (Blow)
- 1997
  - The Yeomen of the Guard (Gilbert & Sullivan)
- 1998
  - The Marriage of Figaro (Mozart)
- 1999
  - Susannah (Floyd)
- 2000
  - Così fan tutte (Mozart)
  - La bohème (Puccini)
- 2001
  - Il Barbiere di Siviglia (Rossini)
  - Carmen (Bizet)
- 2002
  - The Pirates of Penzance (Gilbert & Sullivan) concert performance
  - La Traviata (Verdi)
  - Tosca (Puccini)
- 2003
  - The Merry Widow (Lehár) concert performance
  - Madama Butterfly (Giacomo Puccini)
  - Eugene Onegin (Tchaikovsky)
- 2004
  - Dido and Aeneas (Purcell)
  - Faust (Gounod)
  - Turandot (Puccini)
- 2005
  - Lucia di Lammermoor (Donizetti)
  - Ariadne auf Naxos (Strauss)
  - Falstaff (Verdi)
  - The Medium (Menotti)
- 2006
  - H.M.S. Pinafore (Gilbert & Sullivan) concert performance
  - Le nozze di Figaro (Mozart)
  - Norma (Bellini)
  - La bohème (Puccini)
  - The Turn of the Screw (Britten)
- 2007
  - The Gondoliers (Gilbert & Sullivan) concert performance
  - Die Zauberflöte (Mozart)
  - Suor Angelica & Gianni Schicchi (Puccini)
  - Porgy and Bess (Gershwin)
  - Duke Bluebeard's Castle (Bartók)
- 2008
  - L'elisir d'amore (Donizetti)
  - Otello (Verdi)
  - Carmen (Bizet)
  - Il Tabarro (Puccini)
- 2009
  - Il trovatore (Verdi)
  - Die lustige Witwe (Lehár)
  - Lakmé (Delibes)
  - Amahl and the Night Visitors (Menotti) [Repeated in seasons '10 and '11.]
- 2010
  - The Pirates of Penzance (Gilbert & Sullivan)
  - La fille du régiment (Donizetti)
  - Pikovaya Dama (Tchaikovsky) St. Louis premiere
- 2011
  - Turandot (Puccini)
  - La Cenerentola (Rossini)
  - Dead Man Walking (Heggie) Missouri premiere
- 2012
  - Acis and Galatea (Handel)
  - Un Ballo in Maschera (Verdi)
  - Das Rheingold (Wagner)
- 2013
  - Trouble in Tahiti (Bernstein)
  - Madama Butterfly (Puccini)
  - Die Walküre (Wagner)
- 2014
  - La Traviata (Verdi)
  - A Streetcar Named Desire (Previn) Missouri Premiere
  - Siegfried (Wagner)
- 2015
  - Don Giovanni (Mozart)
  - Rigoletto (Verdi)
  - Götterdämmerung (Wagner)
