= Lincoln's House Divided Speech =

1858 speech by Abraham Lincoln

- Part of 1858 United States Senate election in Illinois
- Clean-shaven political print portrait of Abraham Lincoln, capturing his appearance during his early legislative and congressional career.
- Date: June 16, 1858
- Location: Representatives' Hall, Illinois State Capitol, Springfield, Illinois, U.S.
- Participants: Abraham Lincoln (Senatorial nominee, speaker); Illinois Republican State Convention delegates (Audience)
- Outcome: Launched the historic Lincoln–Douglas debates of 1858; Galvanized northern Republicans against the expansion of slavery; Elevated Lincoln to national prominence despite losing the Senate race to Stephen A. Douglas

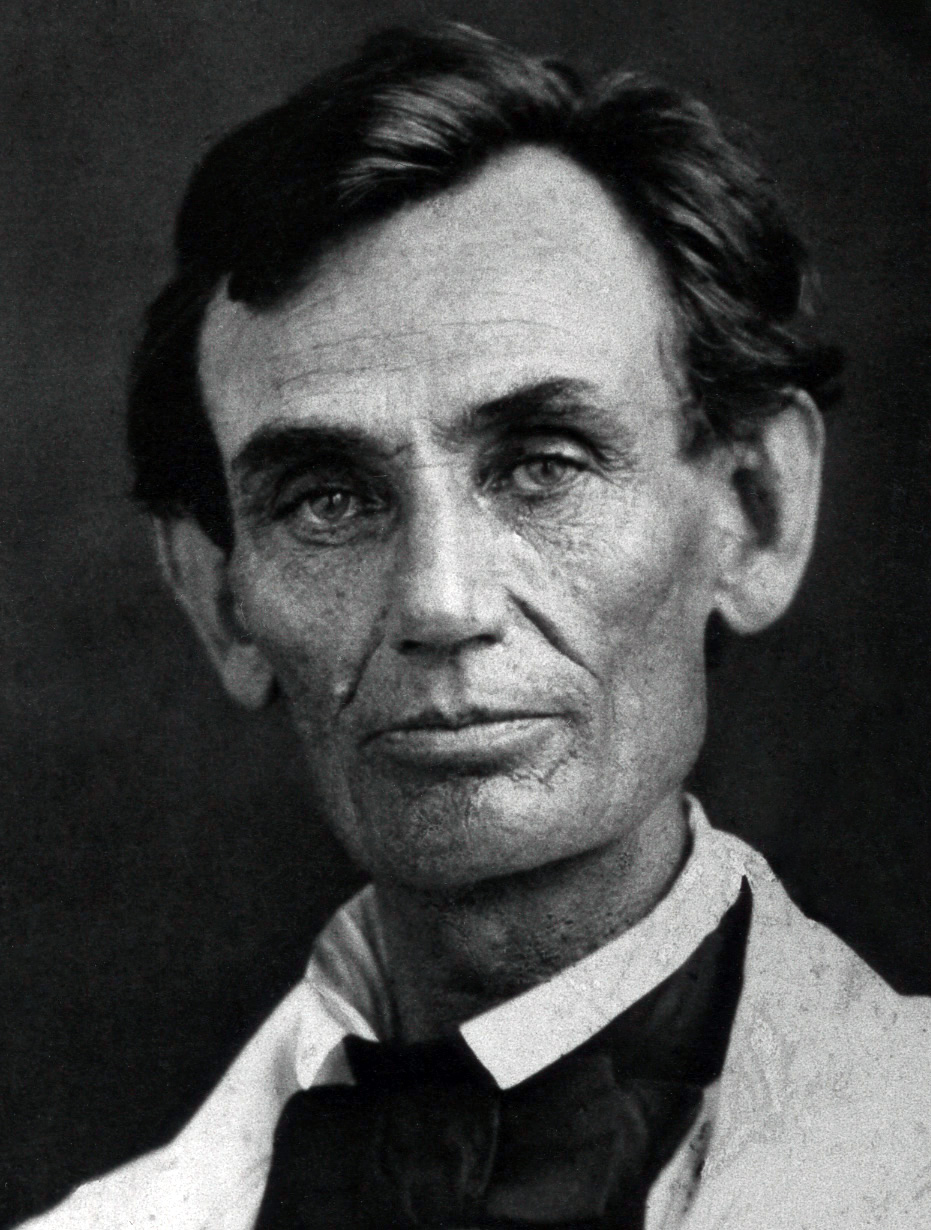
Abraham Lincoln in May 1858

The House Divided Speech was an address given by senatorial candidate and future president of the United States Abraham Lincoln, on June 16, 1858, at what was then the Illinois State Capitol in Springfield, after he had accepted the Illinois Republican Party's nomination as candidate for US senator. The nomination of Lincoln was the final item of business at the convention, which then broke for dinner, meeting again at 8 pm. "The evening session was mainly devoted to speeches", but the only speaker was Lincoln, whose address closed the convention, save for resolutions of thanks to the city of Springfield and others. His address was immediately published in full by newspapers, as a pamphlet, and in the published proceedings of the convention. It was the launching point of his unsuccessful campaign for the senatorial seat held by Stephen A. Douglas; the campaign would climax with the Lincoln–Douglas debates. When Lincoln collected and published his debates with Douglas as part of his 1860 presidential campaign, he prefixed them with relevant prior speeches. The "House Divided" speech opens the volume.

== Overview ==
Lincoln's remarks in Springfield depict the danger of slavery-based disunion, and it rallied Republicans across the North. Along with the Gettysburg Address and his second inaugural address, the speech became one of the best-known of his career. It begins with the following words, which became the best-known passage of the speech:

"A house divided against itself, cannot stand." (Quoting Mark 3:25).

I believe this government cannot endure permanently half slave and half free.

I do not expect the Union to be dissolved – I do not expect the house to fall – but I do expect it will cease to be divided.

It will become all one thing or all the other.

Either the opponents of slavery will arrest the further spread of it, and place it where the public mind shall rest in the belief that it is in the course of ultimate extinction; or its advocates will push it forward, till it shall become lawful in all the States, old as well as new – North as well as South.

Lincoln's goals were to differentiate himself from Douglas – the incumbent – and to voice a prophecy publicly. Douglas had long advocated popular sovereignty, under which the settlers in each new territory would decide their own status as a slave or free state; he had repeatedly asserted that the proper application of popular sovereignty would prevent slavery-induced conflict and would allow Northern and Southern states to resume their peaceful coexistence. Lincoln, however, responded that the Dred Scott ruling had closed the door on Douglas's preferred option, leaving the Union with only two remaining outcomes: the country would inevitably become either all slave or all free. Now that the North and the South had come to hold distinct opinions on the question of slavery, and now that the issue had come to permeate every other political question, the Union would soon no longer be able to function.

== Quotes ==
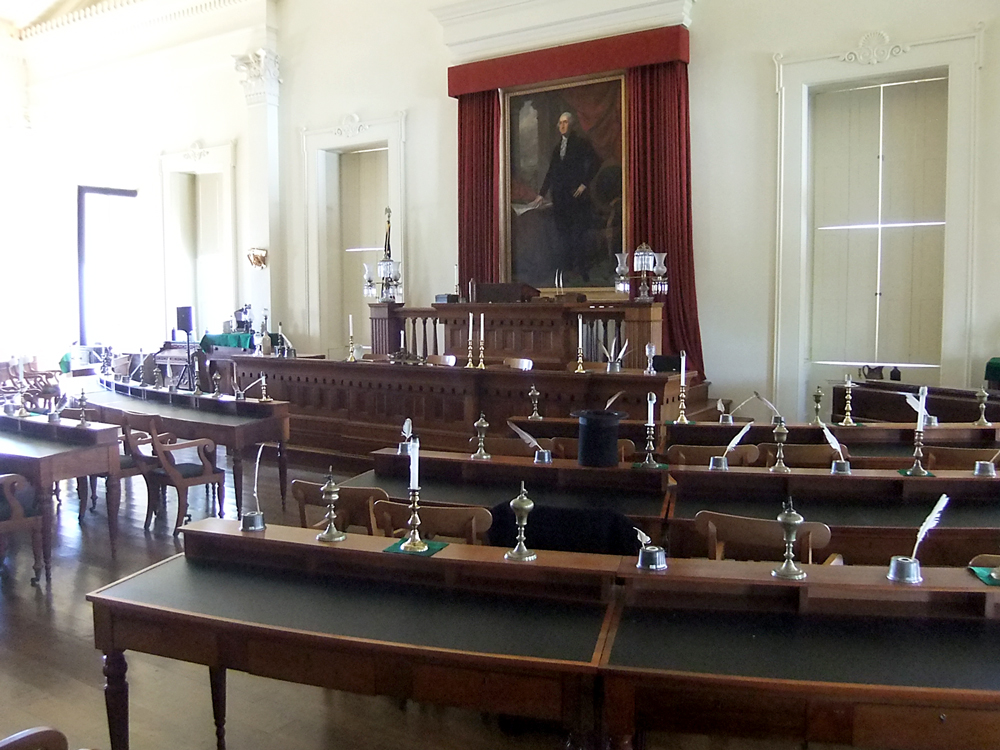
Former Illinois House of Representatives chamber, the site of the speech.

- "A house divided against itself cannot stand." I believe this government cannot endure, permanently half slave and half free. I do not expect the Union to be dissolved – I do not expect the house to fall – but I do expect it will cease to be divided. It will become all one thing, or all the other. Either the opponents of slavery, will arrest the further spread of it, and place it where the public mind shall rest in the belief that it is in course of ultimate extinction; or its advocates will push it forward, till it shall become alike lawful in all the states, old as well as new – North as well as South. Have we no tendency to the latter condition? Let any one who doubts, carefully contemplate that now almost complete legal combination – piece of machinery so to speak – compounded of the Nebraska doctrine, and the Dred Scott decision.
- The Kansas-Nebraska Act opened all the national territory to slavery .... This ... had been provided for ... in the notable argument of "squatter sovereignty," otherwise called "sacred right of self government," which latter phrase, though expressive of the only rightful basis of any government, was so perverted in this attempted use of it as to amount to just this: That if any one man, choose to enslave another, no third man shall be allowed to object.
- While the Nebraska Bill was passing through Congress, a law case, involving the question of a negro's freedom ... was passing through the U.S. Circuit Court for the District of Missouri; and both Nebraska Bill and lawsuit were brought to a decision in the same month of May, 1854. The Negro's name was "Dred Scott" ....
- [The points decided by the "Dred Scott" decision include] that whether the holding a negro in actual slavery in a free state, makes him free, as against the holder, the United States courts will not decide, but will leave to be decided by the courts of any slave state the negro may be forced into by the master. This point is made, not to be pressed immediately ... [that] the logical conclusion that what Dred Scott's master might lawfully do with Dred Scott, in the free state Illinois, every other master may lawfully do with any other one, or one thousand slaves, in Illinois, or in any other free state.
- While the opinion of ... Chief Justice Taney, in the Dred Scott case ... expressly declare[s] that the Constitution of the United States neither permits congress nor a territorial legislature to exclude slavery from any United States territory, ... [Taney] omit[s] to declare whether or not the same constitution permits a state, or the people of a state, to exclude it. Possibly, this was a mere omission; but who can be quite sure ....
- The nearest approach to the point of declaring the power of a state over slavery, is made by Judge Nelson. He approaches it more than once, using the precise idea, and almost the language too, of the Nebraska Act. On one occasion his exact language is, "except in cases where the power is restrained by the Constitution of the United States, the law of the State is supreme over the subject of slavery within its jurisdiction." In what cases the power of the states is so restrained by the U.S. Constitution, is left an open question, precisely as the same question, as to the restraint on the power of the territories was left open in the Nebraska Act. Put that and that together, and we have another nice little niche, which we may, ere long, see filled with another Supreme Court decision, declaring that the Constitution of the United States does not permit a state to exclude slavery from its limits. And this may especially be expected if the doctrine of "care not whether slavery be voted down or voted up" shall gain upon the public mind sufficiently to give promise that such a decision can be maintained when made.
- Such a decision is all that slavery now lacks of being alike lawful in all the States. Welcome, or unwelcome, such decision is probably coming, and will soon be upon us, unless the power of the present political dynasty shall be met and overthrown. We shall lie down pleasantly dreaming that the people of Missouri are on the verge of making their State free, and we shall awake to the reality instead that the Supreme Court has made Illinois a slave state.

== Prior mentions of "a house divided" ==
Early Christians:

- The expression "a house divided against itself" appears three times in the Bible. In the Gospel of Mark 3:25, Jesus states, "And if a house be divided against itself, that house cannot stand." That is in response to the scribes' claim that "by the prince of the devils casteth he out devils." In the Gospel of Matthew 12:25: "Jesus knew their thoughts, and said unto him, Every kingdom divided against itself is brought to desolation; and every city or house divided against itself shall not stand" (King James Version). And in the Gospel of Luke 11:17: "Jesus knew their thoughts and said to them: “Any kingdom divided against itself will be ruined, and a house divided against itself will fall" (New International Version).
- Saint Augustine, in his Confessions (Book 8, Chapter 8) describes his conversion experience as being "a house divided against itself."

It also appears in widely-read English writers:

- Thomas Hobbes, in his 1651 Leviathan (Chapter 18), states that "a kingdom divided in itself cannot stand."
- In Thomas Paine's 1776 Common Sense, he describes the composition of the English constitution "hath all the distinctions of a house divided against itself. ... "

In the United States:

- In Federalist No. 4, John Jay wrote "when a people or family so divide, it never fails to be against themselves."
- Elbridge Gerry used the phrase in 1810 to criticize the emerging First Party System.
- During the War of 1812 a line appeared in a letter from Abigail Adams to Mercy Otis Warren: "... A house divided upon itself – and upon that foundation do our enemies build their hopes of subduing us."
- Felix Walker, in his speech for Buncombe, on the Missouri Compromise, said, "And we have the word of truth for it, that a house divided against itself cannot stand."
- The "house divided" phrase had been used by Lincoln himself in another context in 1843. It was also used in his Lost Bloomington speech of 1856.
- Famously, eight years before Lincoln's speech, during the Senate debate on the Compromise of 1850, Sam Houston had proclaimed: "A nation divided against itself cannot stand."

However and most relevantly, the expression was used repeatedly earlier in 1858 in discussions of the situation in Kansas, where slavery was the central issue.

- It was used editorially in the Brooklyn Evening Star of January 8, the New York Daily Herald on January 12, and the Alton Weekly Telegraph of January 28.
- It appeared, in quotation marks, in a letter to the editor published in The Liberator on April 23. Lincoln received The Liberator, as it was sent free to all prominent politicians outside the South, but it is not known if he read it.

== See also ==
- Abraham Lincoln on slavery
- Origins of the American Civil War
