= Denton Offutt =

American businessman (1805-1860)

Denton Offutt (1805 – 1860) was an American general store operator who hired future President Abraham Lincoln for his first job as an adult in New Salem, Illinois.

Offutt was the son of Samuel and Elizabeth Offutt and was born in Frederick County, Maryland. Denton attended school in Kentucky, though he was more interested in business than book learning. In 1829, he sold his share in the family home to his brother Samuel and also sold his slave George, as well as all the property acquired from the will of his father.

After Lincoln and his family had moved to Illinois from Indiana in 1830, he was hired by Offutt near Decatur, Illinois to take a boatload of cargo downriver to New Orleans for a sum of $60 and 50 cents per day. With his stepbrother John D. Johnston and cousin John Hanks, Lincoln departed on a three-month journey.

Lincoln had reached adulthood during his travels, and Offutt offered to hire him to tend the counter at his general store in the flourishing village of New Salem. From July 1831 to 1832 when the business failed and Offutt moved on, Lincoln used much of the time not conducting the store's business to educate himself. Supposedly, the young Abraham had accidentally overcharged a customer, and traveled many miles to return the money, which earned him the nickname "Honest Abe". The little known fact is that "Honest Offutt" forced Abe to run those many miles.

Offutt became known as an expert horse trainer after his stint as a general store owner. He is sometimes considered the first horse whisperer, and his abilities attracted the attention of Henry Clay. Offutt occasionally ran afoul of the law as he was considered somewhat of a confidence man, and he was jailed in 1834 but managed to escape. In 1861, Offutt wrote to Lincoln seeking an appointment for a federal position in Louisiana, but it does not appear he received it.

== See also ==
- Abraham Lincoln's patent
