= Mentor Graham =

American teacher (1800–1886)

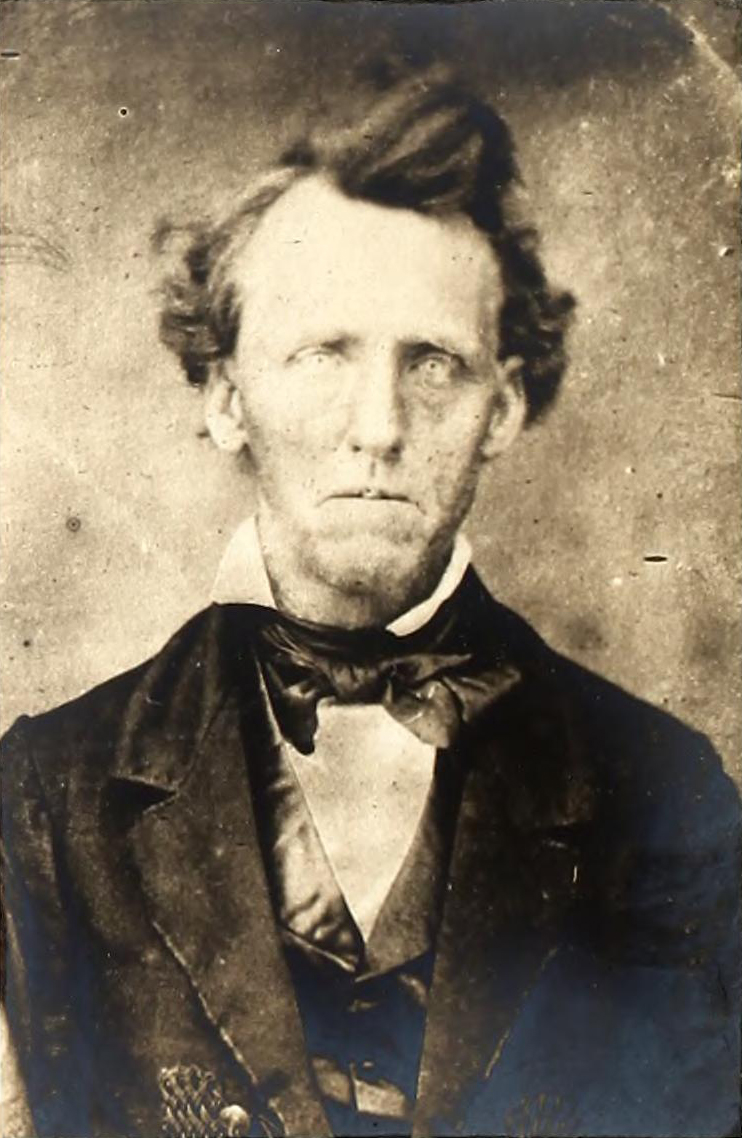
- William Mentor Graham photograph, date unknown
- Born: 1800; Greensburg, Kentucky, U.S.
- Died: 1886 (aged 85–86); Blunt, South Dakota, U.S.
- Occupation: Teacher
- Known for: Tutoring Abraham Lincoln

William Mentor Graham (1800–1886) was an American teacher best known for tutoring Abraham Lincoln and giving him his higher education during the future President's time in New Salem, Illinois. Graham was born near Greensburg, Kentucky. He died in 1886 in Blunt, Dakota Territory.
