= Lincoln–Douglas debates =

1858 political debates in Illinois, U.S.

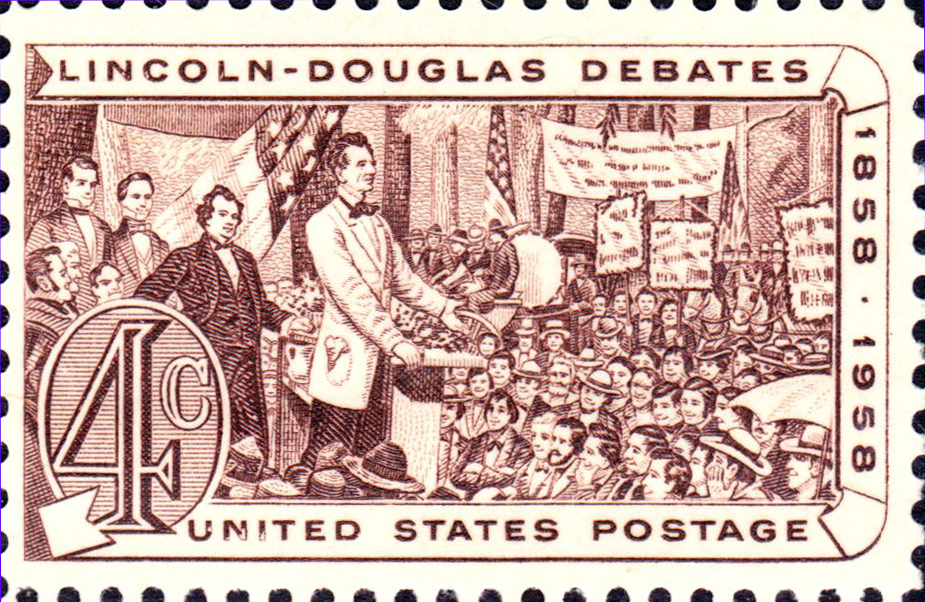
- A 1918 painting by Robert Marshall Root depicting Abraham Lincoln addressing a crowd during one of the debates.
- Date: August 21 – October 15, 1858
- Location: Illinois, U.S. (Seven locations: Ottawa, Freeport, Jonesboro, Charleston, Galesburg, Quincy, and Alton)
- Participants: Abraham Lincoln (Republican); Stephen A. Douglas (Democratic)
- Outcome: Douglas re-elected to the U.S. Senate by the Illinois General Assembly; Creation of the Freeport Doctrine by Douglas; National prominence achieved by Lincoln, positioning him for the 1860 presidential election; Deepening of the sectional split within the Democratic Party

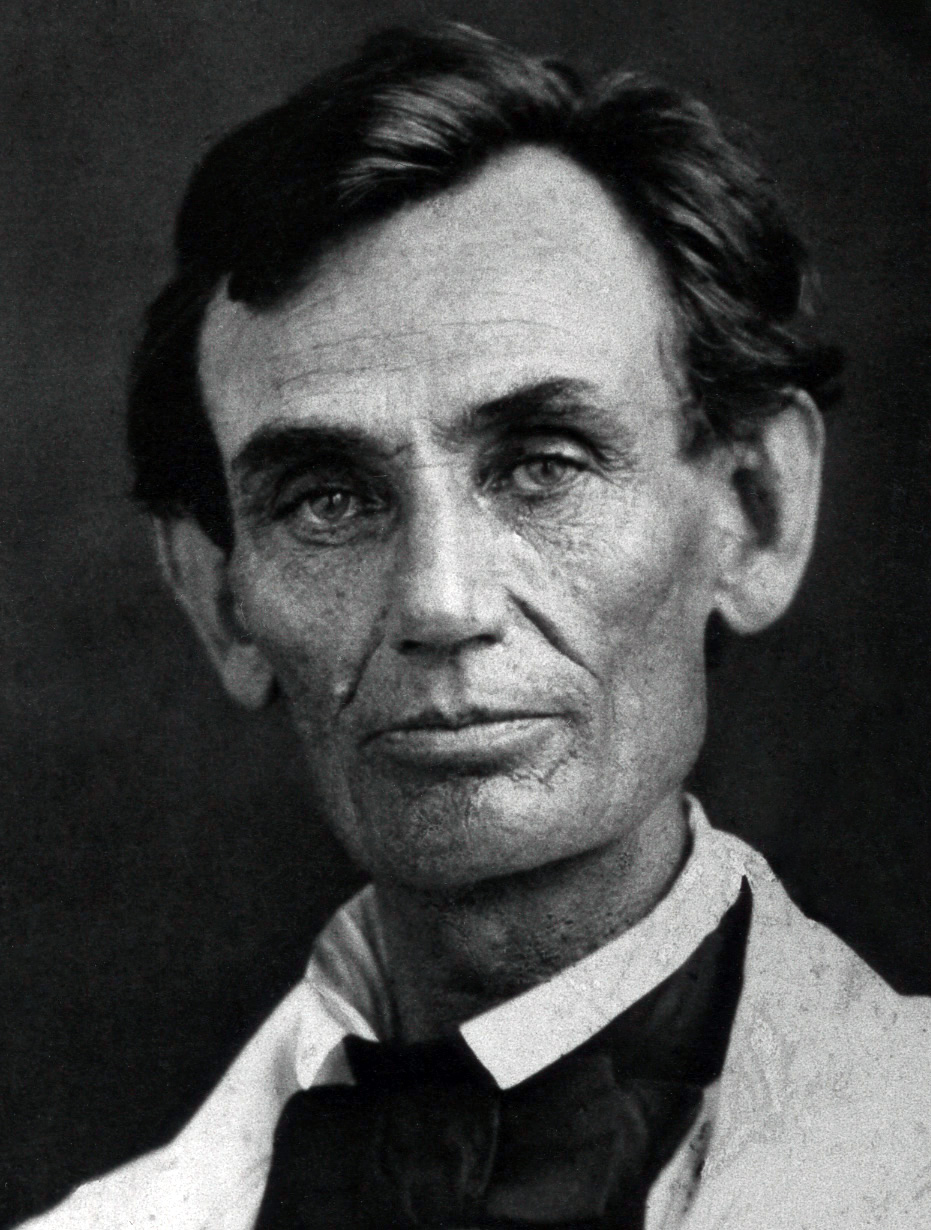
Abraham Lincoln in May 1858

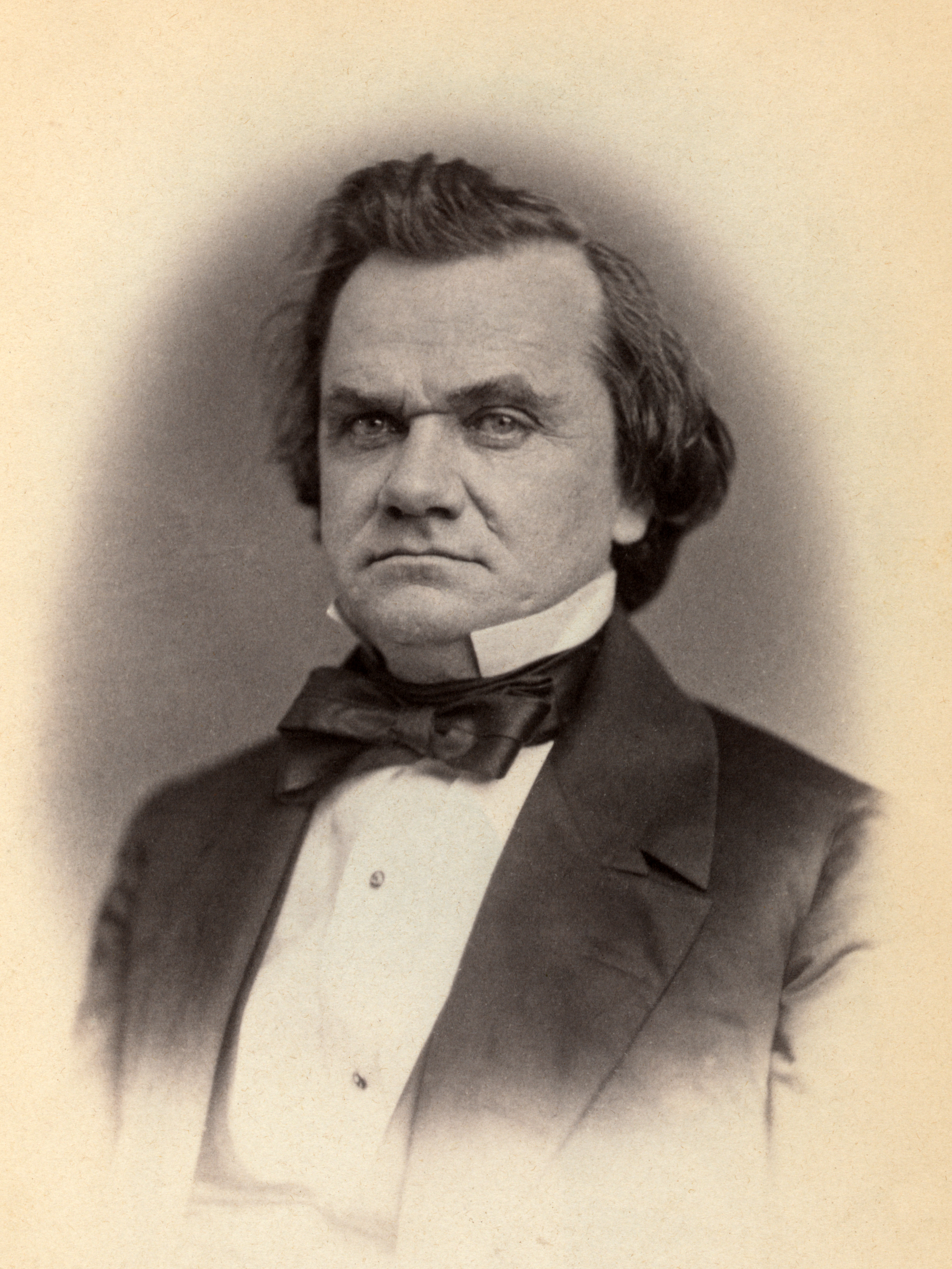
Stephen A. Douglas in 1859

The Lincoln–Douglas debates were a series of seven debates in 1858 between Abraham Lincoln, the Republican Party candidate for the United States Senate from Illinois, and incumbent Senator Stephen Douglas, the Democratic Party candidate. Until the Seventeenth Amendment to the United States Constitution, which provides that senators shall be elected by the people of their states, was ratified in 1913, senators were elected by their respective state legislatures. Therefore, Lincoln and Douglas were trying to win the people's votes for legislators in the Illinois General Assembly, aligned with their respective political parties.

The debates were designed to generate publicity—some of the first examples of what in modern parlance would be characterized as "media events". For Lincoln, they were an opportunity to raise both his state and national profile and that of the burgeoning Republican Party, newly organized four years before in Ripon, Wisconsin, in 1854. For Senator Douglas, they were an opportunity to defend his record—especially his role in promoting the doctrine of popular sovereignty, which, under the Kansas–Nebraska Act of 1854 allowed the white men of each new state to decide whether to allow slavery in the state. The candidates spoke in each of Illinois's nine congressional districts. They had already spoken in the state capital of Springfield and in the state's largest city of Chicago within a day of each other, so they decided that their future joint appearances would be held in the remaining seven congressional districts. Since Douglas was the incumbent, he had very little to gain from these debates. However, Lincoln, only a one-term U.S. Representative (congressman) a decade before, was gaining support, having spoken the day after Douglas spoke in Chicago, and thus presenting a rejoinder Douglas could not answer back with a rebuttal. Each debate lasted about three hours, with each candidate speaking for sixty minutes, followed by a ninety-minute response and a final thirty-minute rejoinder by the first candidate.Douglas and Lincoln alternated who spoke first at the debates; as the incumbent, Douglas spoke first in four. They were held outdoors, weather permitting, from about 2 to 5 p.m.

The debates focused on slavery, specifically on whether it should be allowed in the new states to be formed from the western federal territories acquired through the Louisiana Purchase of 1803 and the Mexican Cession of 1849. Douglas, as the Democratic candidate, held that the decision should be made by the white residents of the new states rather than by the federal government ("popular sovereignty"). Lincoln argued against the expansion of slavery, yet stressed that he was not advocating its abolition where it already existed.

Never in American history had there been widespread newspaper coverage of political debates. Both candidates felt they were speaking to the whole nation. New technology had become available in recent years: railroad networks, the electric telegraph with its Morse code, and Pitman shorthand writing, at that time called "phonography". The state's largest newspapers, based in Chicago, sent phonographers—now known as stenographers—to copy and report complete texts of each debate; thanks to the new railroads, the debates were not hard to reach from Chicago. Halfway through each debate and series of speeches, runners were handed the stenographers' notes. They raced to meet the next train to Chicago, handing the notes to railway riding stenographers who during the journey converted the shorthand symbols and abbreviations back into their original words, producing a transcript ready for the Chicago typesetters printing presses, and for the telegrapher, who sent the texts to the rest of the country east of the Rocky Mountains, which was as far as the telegraph wires reached. The next train would deliver the conclusion of the debate. The papers published the speeches in full, sometimes within hours of their delivery. Some newspapers helped their preferred candidate with minor corrections, reports on the audience's positive reaction, or tendentious headlines ("New and Powerful Argument by Mr. Lincoln–Douglas Tells the Same Old Story"). The newswire of the Associated Press, then only a decade old, sent messages simultaneously to multiple points, enabling newspapers and magazines east of the Rockies to print the debates soon after they occurred, which led to the debates rapidly becoming nationally followed events. They were later republished as pamphlets.

The debates took place between August and October of 1858. Newspapers reported 12,000 in attendance in Ottawa (Illinois), 16,000 to 18,000 in Galesburg, 15,000 in Freeport, 12,000 in Quincy, and at the last debate in Alton, 5,000 to 10,000. The debates near Illinois's borders (Freeport, Quincy, and Alton) drew large numbers of people from neighboring states. A number travelled within Illinois to follow the debates.

Douglas was re-elected by the Illinois General Assembly, 54–46. But Lincoln's party had won the popular vote in what historian Allen Guelzo labels "an upset, not just in terms of those voting statistics", but in making Lincoln a national figure and laying the groundwork for his 1860 presidential campaign.

As part of that endeavor, Lincoln edited the texts of all the debates and had them published in a book. It sold well and helped him receive the Republican Party's nomination for president at the 1860 Republican National Convention in Chicago.

== Background ==
Douglas was elected to the United States Senate in 1846, and he was seeking re-election for a third term in 1858. The issue of slavery was raised several times during his tenure in the Senate, particularly with respect to the Compromise of 1850. As chairman of the committee on U.S. territories, he argued for an approach to slavery called popular sovereignty: electorates in the territories would vote whether to adopt or reject slavery. Decisions previously had been made at the federal level concerning slavery in the territories. Douglas introduced the Kansas–Nebraska Act in the Senate. It became law on May 30, 1854, repealing the Missouri Compromise and "substituting for the ban on slavery what Douglas called 'popular sovereignty' ... arous[ing] a storm of protest throughout the North". The Gilder Lehrman Institute of American History's Mr. Lincoln and Friends Society notes that prominent Bloomington, Illinois resident Jesse W. Fell, a local real estate developer who founded the Bloomington Pantagraph and who befriended Lincoln in 1834, had suggested the debates in 1854.

Lincoln was elected to Congress in 1846, and he served a two-year term in the House of Representatives. During his tenure in the Congress, he disagreed with Douglas and supported the Wilmot Proviso, which sought to ban slavery in any new territory. He returned to politics in the 1850s to oppose the Kansas–Nebraska Act and to help develop the new Republican Party.

Before the debates, Lincoln charged that Douglas was encouraging fears of amalgamation of the races, with enough success to drive thousands of people away from the Republican Party. Douglas replied that Lincoln was an abolitionist for saying that the United States Declaration of Independence applied to both blacks and whites.

Lincoln argued in his House Divided Speech that Douglas was part of a conspiracy to nationalize slavery. Lincoln said that ending the Missouri Compromise ban on slavery in Kansas and Nebraska was the first step in this nationalizing and that the Dred Scott decision was another step in the direction of spreading slavery into Northern territories. He expressed the fear that any similar Supreme Court decision would turn Illinois into a slave state.

Much has been written of Lincoln's rhetorical style but, going into the debates, Douglas's reputation was daunting. As James G. Blaine later wrote:

He [Douglas] was everywhere known as a debater of singular skill. His mind was fertile in resources. He was master of logic. No man perceived more quickly than he the strength or the weakness of an argument, and no one excelled him in the use of sophistry and fallacy. Where he could not elucidate a point to his own advantage, he would fatally becloud it for his opponent. In that peculiar style of debate, which, in its intensity, resembles a physical contest, he had no equal. He spoke with extraordinary readiness. There was no halting in his phrase. He used good English, terse, vigorous, pointed. He disregarded the adornments of rhetoric,—rarely used a simile. He was utterly destitute of humor, and had slight appreciation of wit. He never cited historical precedents except from the domain of American politics. Inside that field his knowledge was comprehensive, minute, critical. Beyond it his learning was limited. He was not a reader. His recreations were not in literature. In the whole range of his voluminous speaking it would be difficult to find either a line of poetry or a classical allusion. But he was by nature an orator; and by long practice a debater. He could lead a crowd almost irresistibly to his own conclusions. He could, if he wished, incite a mob to desperate deeds. He was, in short, an able, audacious, almost unconquerable opponent in public discussion.

== The debates ==
Locations in Illinois where Lincoln and Douglas debated. Green denotes debates between Lincoln and Douglas while purple denotes places where they spoke separately within a day of each other.

When Lincoln made the debates into a book, in 1860, he included the following material as preliminaries:

- Speech at Springfield by Lincoln, June 16, the "Lincoln's House Divided Speech" speech (in the volume, the erroneous date June 17 is given)
- Speech at Chicago by Douglas, July 9
- Speech at Chicago by Lincoln, July 10
- Speech at Bloomington by Douglas, July 16
- Speech at Springfield by Douglas, July 17 (Lincoln was not present)
- Speech at Springfield by Lincoln, July 17 (Douglas was not present)
- Preliminary correspondence of Lincoln and Douglas, July 24–31

The debates were held in seven towns in the state of Illinois:

- Ottawa on August 21
- Freeport on August 27
- Jonesboro on September 15
- Charleston on September 18
- Galesburg on October 7
- Quincy on October 13
- Alton on October 15

Slavery was the main theme of the Lincoln–Douglas debates, particularly the issue of slavery's expansion into the territories. Douglas's Kansas–Nebraska Act repealed the Missouri Compromise's ban on slavery in the territories of Kansas and Nebraska and replaced it with the doctrine of popular sovereignty, which meant that the people of a territory would vote as to whether to allow slavery. During the debates, both Lincoln and Douglas appealed to the "Fathers" (Founding Fathers) to bolster their cases.

=== Ottawa ===
Lincoln said at Ottawa:

I hate [indifference to slavery] because of the monstrous injustice of slavery itself. I hate it because it deprives our republican example of its just influence in the world—enables the enemies of free institutions, with plausibility, to taunt us as hypocrites—causes the real friends of freedom to doubt our sincerity, and especially because it forces so many really good men amongst ourselves into an open war with the very fundamental principles of civil liberty—criticizing the Declaration of Independence, and insisting that there is no right principle of action but self-interest.

Lincoln said in the first debate, in Ottawa, that popular sovereignty would nationalize and perpetuate slavery. Douglas replied that both Whigs and Democrats believed in popular sovereignty and that the Compromise of 1850 was an example of this. Lincoln said that the national policy was to limit the spread of slavery, and he mentioned the Northwest Ordinance of 1787 as an example of this policy, which banned slavery from a large part of the Midwest.

The Compromise of 1850 allowed the territories of Utah and New Mexico to decide for or against slavery, but it also allowed the admission of California as a free state, reduced the size of the slave state of Texas by adjusting the boundary, and ended the slave trade (but not slavery itself) in the District of Columbia. In return, the South got the Fugitive Slave Law, which was stronger than the Fugitive Slave Act of 1793. Douglas said that the Compromise of 1850 replaced the Missouri Compromise's ban on slavery in the Louisiana Purchase territory north and west of the state of Missouri, while Lincoln said—a topic he went back to in the Jonesboro debate—that Douglas was mistaken in seeing "Popular Sovereignty" and the Dred Scott decision as being in harmony with the Compromise of 1850. To the contrary, "Popular Sovereignty" would nationalize slavery.

There were partisan remarks, such as Douglas's accusations that members of the "Black Republican" party were abolitionists, including Lincoln, and he cited as proof Lincoln's House Divided Speech, in which he said, "I believe this government cannot endure permanently half slave and half free." Douglas also charged Lincoln with opposing the Dred Scott decision because "it deprives the negro of the rights and privileges of citizenship." Lincoln responded that "the next Dred Scott decision" could bring about "the nationalization of slavery". Douglas accused Lincoln of wanting to overthrow state laws, which were popular with the northern Democrats, that excluded Black people from states such as Illinois. Lincoln did not argue for complete social equality, but he did say that Douglas ignored the basic humanity of Black people and that slaves did have an equal right to liberty, stating, "I agree with Judge Douglas he is not my equal in many respects—certainly not in color, perhaps not in moral or intellectual endowment. But in the right to eat the bread, without the leave of anybody else, which his own hand earns, he is my equal and the equal of Judge Douglas, and the equal of every living man".

Lincoln said that he did not know how emancipation should happen. He believed in colonization in Africa by emancipated slaves, but admitted that it was impractical. He said that it would be wrong for emancipated slaves to be treated as "underlings", but that there was a large opposition to social and political equality and that "a universal feeling, whether well or ill-founded, cannot be safely disregarded." He said that Douglas's public indifference would result in the expansion of slavery because it would mold public sentiment to accept it. As Lincoln said, "public sentiment is everything. With public sentiment, nothing can fail; without it, nothing can succeed. Consequently he who molds public sentiment goes deeper than he who enacts statutes or pronounces decisions. He makes statutes and decisions possible or impossible to be executed." He said that Douglas "cares not whether slavery is voted down or voted up," and that he would "blow out the moral lights around us" and eradicate the love of liberty.

=== Freeport ===
At the debate at Freeport, Lincoln forced Douglas to choose between two options, either of which would damage Douglas's popularity and chances of getting reelected. He asked Douglas to reconcile popular sovereignty with the Supreme Court's Dred Scott decision. Douglas responded that the people of a territory could keep slavery out even though the Supreme Court said that the federal government had no authority to exclude slavery, simply by refusing to pass a slave code and other legislation needed to protect slavery. Douglas alienated Southerners with this Freeport Doctrine, which damaged his chances of winning the presidency in 1860. As a result, Southern politicians used their demand for a slave code to drive a wedge between the Northern and Southern wings of the Democratic Party, splitting the majority political party in 1858.

Douglas failed to gain support in all sections of the country through popular sovereignty. By allowing slavery where the majority wanted it, he lost the support of Republicans led by Lincoln, who thought that Douglas was unprincipled. He lost the support of the South by rejecting the pro-slavery Lecompton Constitution and advocating a Freeport Doctrine to stop slavery in Kansas, where the majority were anti-slavery.

=== Jonesboro ===
In his address in Jonesboro, Lincoln said that the expansion of slavery would endanger the Union, and mentioned the controversies over slavery in Missouri in 1820, in the territories conquered from Mexico that led to the Compromise of 1850, and again with the Bleeding Kansas controversy. He said that the crisis would be reached and passed when slavery was put "in the course of ultimate extinction."

=== Charleston ===
Before the debate at Charleston, Democrats held up a banner that read "Negro equality" with a picture of a white man, a negro woman, and a mulatto child.

Lincoln began his address by clarifying that his concerns about slavery did not equate to support for racial equality. He stated:

I will say then that I am not, nor ever have been in favor of bringing about in any way the social and political equality of the white and black races—that I am not nor ever have been in favor of making voters or jurors of negroes, nor of qualifying them to hold office, nor to intermarry with white people; and I will say in addition to this that there is a physical difference between the white and black races which I believe will for ever forbid the two races living together on terms of social and political equality. And inasmuch as they cannot so live, while they do remain together there must be the position of superior and inferior, and I as much as any other man am in favor of having the superior position assigned to the white race.

In his subsequent response, Douglas said that Lincoln had an ally in Frederick Douglass in preaching "abolition doctrines", claiming that Douglass told "all the friends of negro equality and negro citizenship to rally as one man around Abraham Lincoln." Douglas also charged Lincoln with a lack of consistency when speaking on the issue of racial equality (in the Charleston debate) and cited Lincoln's previous statements that the declaration that all men are created equal applies to blacks as well as whites. In response to Douglas's questioning of Lincoln's support of black citizenship, if not full equality, Lincoln further clarified in his rejoinder: "I tell him very frankly that I am not in favor of negro citizenship."

=== Galesburg ===
At Galesburg, using quotes from Lincoln's Chicago address, Douglas sought again to prove that Lincoln was an abolitionist because of his insistence upon the principle that "all men are equal".

=== Quincy ===
The debate in Quincy was held on October 13. In the debate Lincoln responded to the belief from Douglas that he saw no difference in races by saying " I am not, nor ever have been, in favor of bringing about in any way the social and political equality of the white and black races—that I am not nor ever have been in favor of making voters or jurors of negroes, nor of qualifying them to hold office, nor to intermingling with white people; and I will say in addition to this that there is a physical difference between the white and black races which will ever forbid the two races living together on terms of social and political equality. And inasmuch as they cannot so live, while they do remain together, there must be the position of superior. I am as much as any other man in favor of having the superior position assigned to the white race." His actions may have partially been motivated to maintain audience support, though at the same time revealed potential internal racial biases.

=== Alton ===
At Alton, Lincoln tried to reconcile his statements on equality. He said that the authors of the Declaration of Independence "intended to include all men, but they did not mean to declare all men equal in all respects." As Lincoln said, "They meant to set up a standard maxim for the free society which should be familiar to all,—constantly looked to, constantly labored for, and even, though never perfectly attained, constantly approximated, and thereby constantly spreading and deepening its influence, and augmenting the happiness and value of life to all people, of all colors, everywhere." He contrasted his support for the Declaration with opposing statements made by John C. Calhoun and Senator John Pettit of Indiana, who called the Declaration "a self-evident lie". Lincoln said that Chief Justice Roger Taney and Stephen Douglas were opposing Thomas Jefferson's self-evident truth, dehumanizing blacks and preparing the public mind to think of them as only property. Lincoln thought that slavery had to be treated as a wrong and kept from growing.

As Lincoln said at Alton:

It is the eternal struggle between these two principles—right and wrong—throughout the world. ... It is the same spirit that says, "You work and toil and earn bread, and I'll eat it." No matter in what shape it comes, whether from the mouth of a king who seeks to bestride the people of his own nation and live by the fruit of their labor or from one race of men as an apology for enslaving another race, it is the same tyrannical principle.

These words were set to music by Aaron Copland in his Lincoln Portrait.

Lincoln used a number of colorful phrases in the debates. He said that one argument by Douglas made a horse chestnut into a chestnut horse, and he compared an evasion by Douglas to the sepia cloud from a cuttlefish. In Quincy, Lincoln said that Douglas's Freeport Doctrine was do-nothing sovereignty that was "as thin as the homeopathic soup that was made by boiling the shadow of a pigeon that had starved to death."

== The role of technology ==
Recent improvements in technology were fundamental to the debates' success and popularity. New railroads connected major cities at high speeds—a message that on a horse would have taken a week arrived in hours. A forgotten "soft" technology, Pitman shorthand, allowed writing to keep up with speech, far closer to a recording than had been possible before. Finally, messages could now be sent via the electrical telegraph, anywhere east of the Rocky Mountains. "The combination of shorthand, the telegraph and the railroad changed everything," wrote Allen C. Guelzo, author of Lincoln and Douglas: The Debates That Defined America. "It was unprecedented. Lincoln and Douglas knew they were speaking to the whole nation. It was like JFK in 1960 coming to grips with the presence of the vast new television audience."

== Results ==
1859 United States Senate election in Illinois
- January 5, 1859
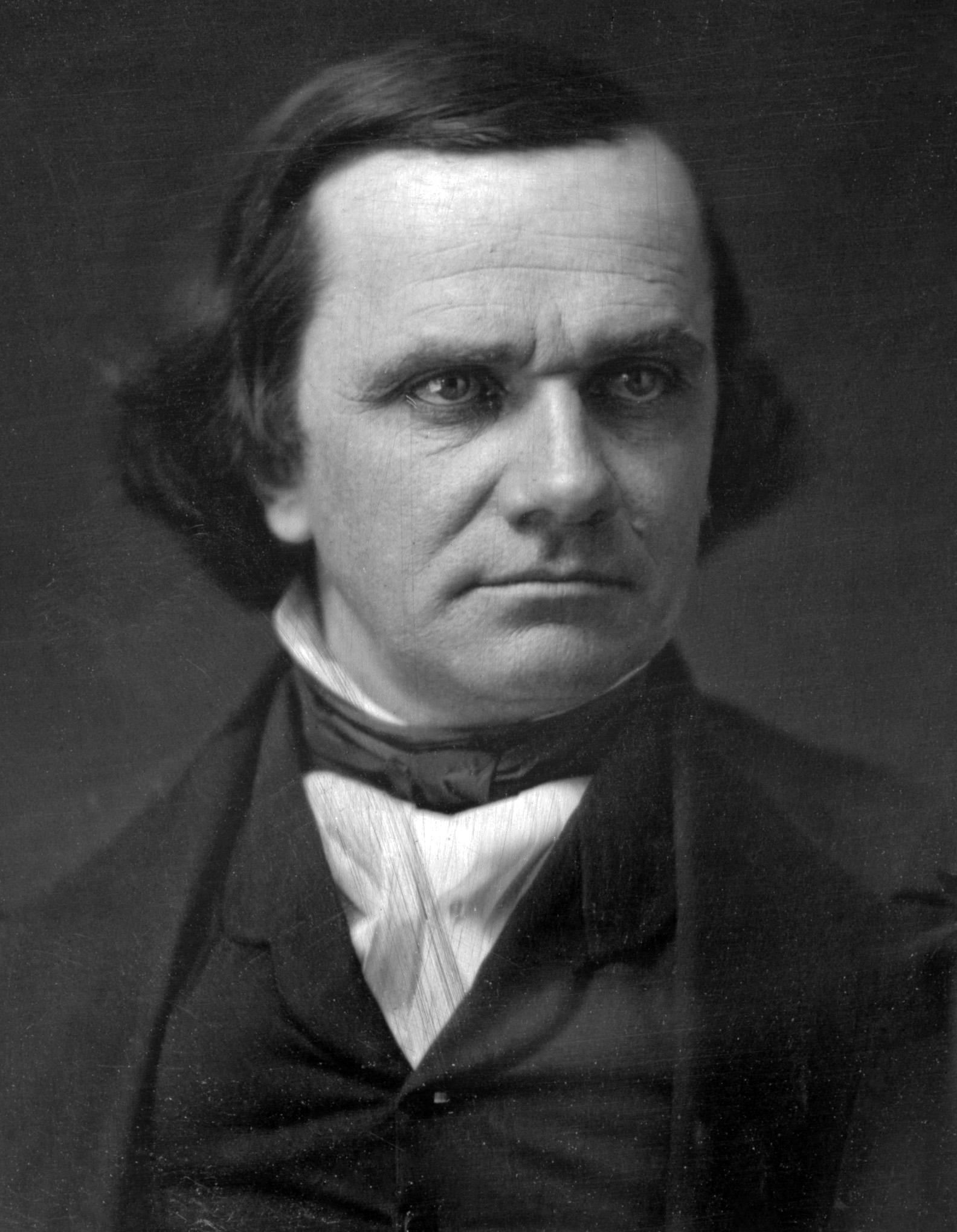

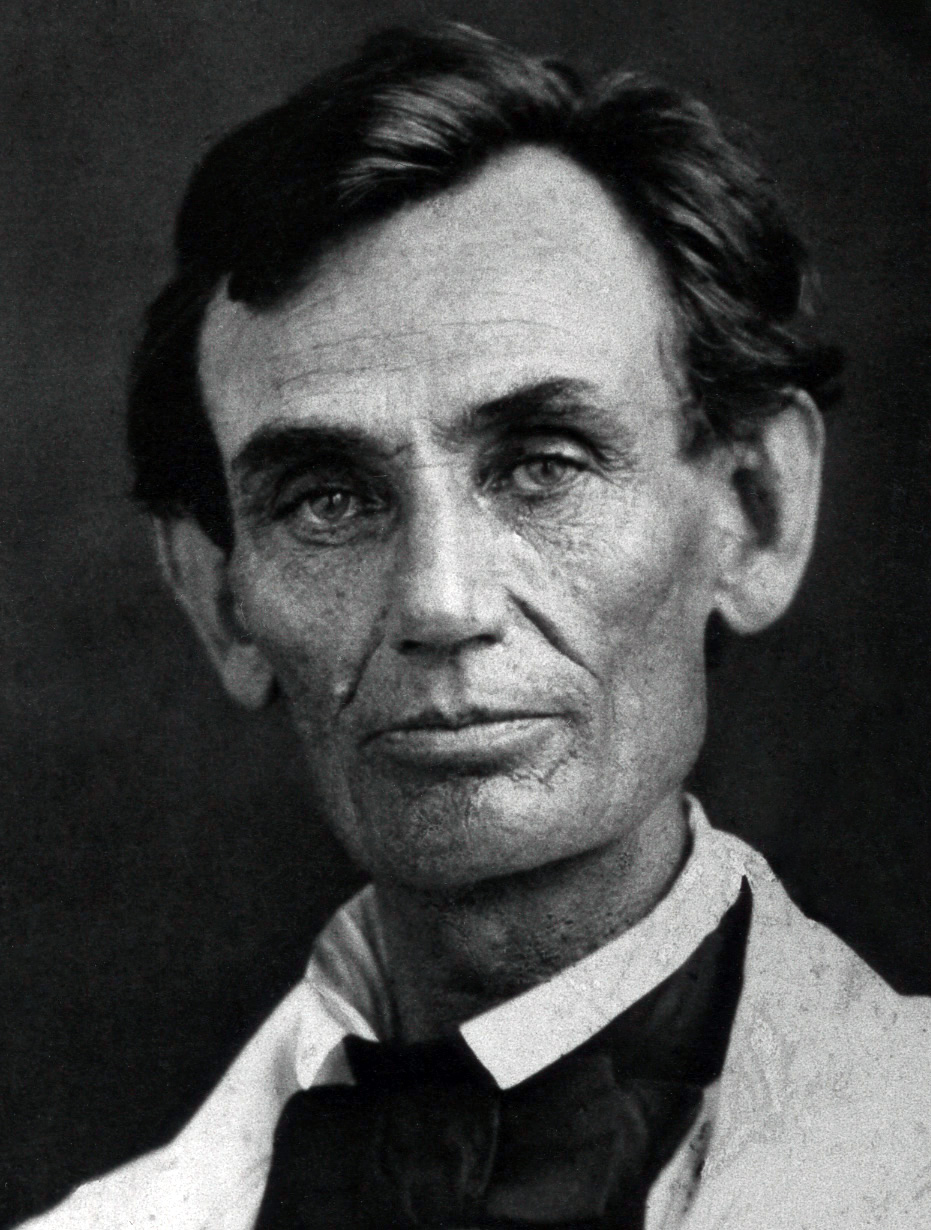
Nominee	Stephen A. Douglas	Abraham Lincoln
Party	Democratic	Republican
Electoral vote	54 (Note: Douglas received 40 votes in the House and 14 votes in the Senate)	46 (Note: Lincoln received 35 votes in the House and 11 votes in the Senate)
Popular vote	166,374 (Note: Popular Vote of State Assembly candidates)	190,468
Percentage	45.33%	51.90%
- State Senate results Douglas Lincoln
Senator before election
Stephen A. Douglas
Democratic
Elected Senator
Stephen A. Douglas
Democratic

The October surprise of the election was former Whig John J. Crittenden's endorsement of Douglas. Non-Republican former Whigs comprised the biggest block of swing voters, and Crittenden's endorsement of Douglas rather than Lincoln reduced Lincoln's chances of winning.

The districts were drawn to favor Douglas's party, and the Democrats won 40 seats in the state House of Representatives while the Republicans won 35. In the State Senate, Republicans held 11 seats and Democrats held 14. Douglas was re-elected by the legislature 54–46, even though Republican candidates for the state legislature together received 24,094 more votes than candidates supporting Douglas. However, the widespread media coverage of the debates greatly raised Lincoln's national profile, making him a viable candidate for nomination as the Republican candidate in the upcoming 1860 presidential election.

Ohio Republican committee chairman George Parsons put Lincoln in touch with Ohio's main political publisher, Follett, Foster and Company in Columbus, Ohio. In 1860, it published the text of the debates in Political Debates Between Hon. Abraham Lincoln and Hon. Stephen A. Douglas in the Celebrated Campaign of 1858, in Illinois. Four printings were made, and the fourth sold 16,000 copies. In 1993, HarperCollins published The Lincoln-Douglas Debates: The First Complete, Unexpurgated Text, edited with an introduction by Harold Holzer.

== Commemoration ==
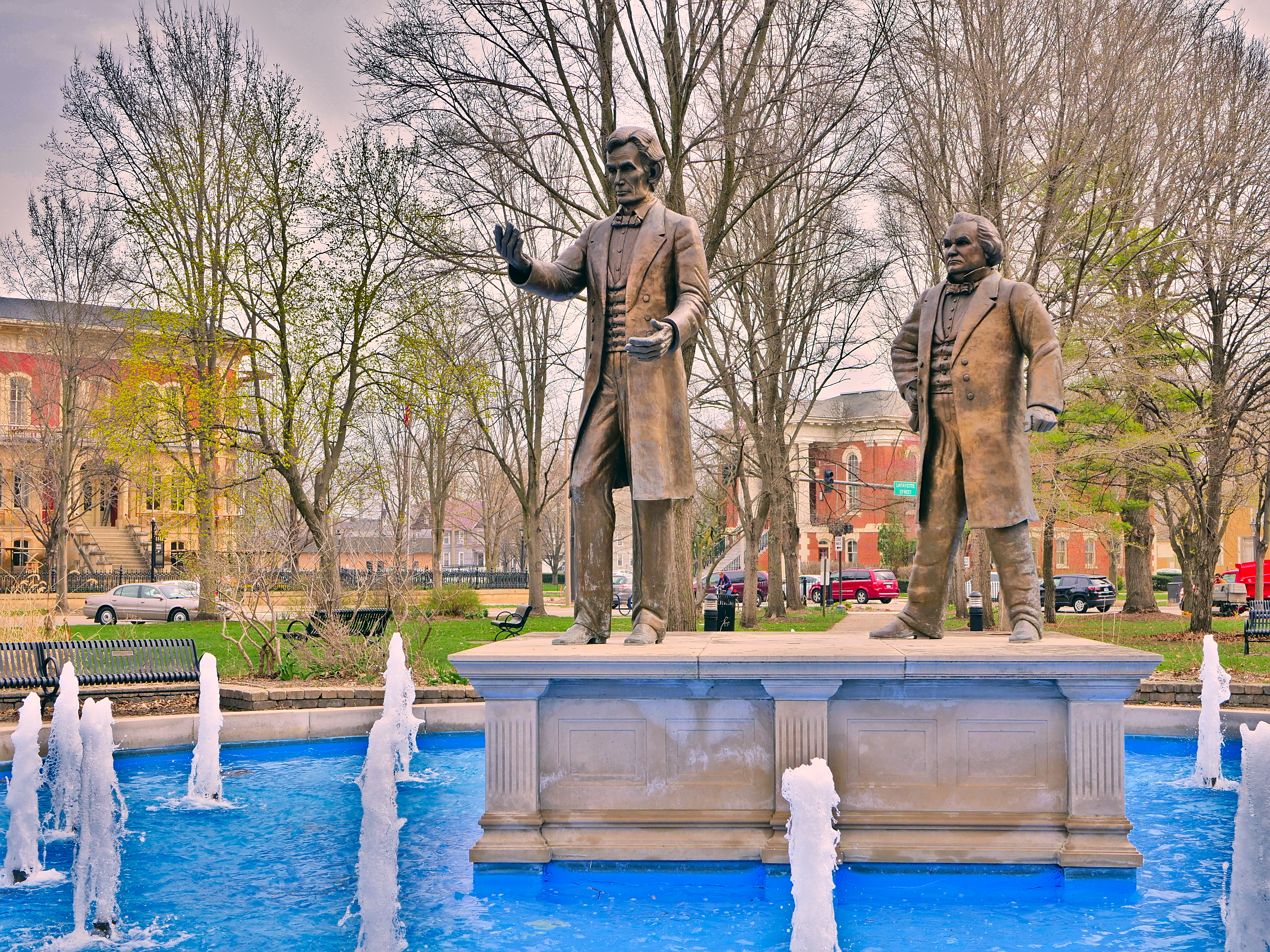
Commemorative statue on the site of the Ottawa debate

The debate locations in Illinois feature plaques and statuary of Douglas and Lincoln.

There is a Lincoln–Douglas Debate Museum in Charleston.

In 1994, C-SPAN aired a series of re-enactments of the debates filmed on location.

In 2008, BBC Audiobooks America recorded David Strathairn (Lincoln) and Richard Dreyfuss (Douglas) reenacting the debates.

== See also ==
- Bleeding Kansas
