= John Hanks =

American politician and Abraham Lincoln's cousin (1802–1889)

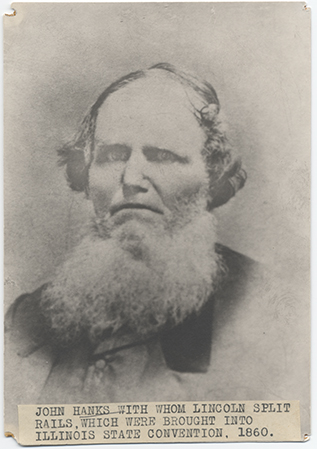
John Hanks

John Hanks (February 9, 1802 – July 1, 1889) was Abraham Lincoln's first cousin, once removed, his mother's cousin. He was the son of William, Nancy Hanks Lincoln's uncle and grandson of Joseph Hanks.

== Early years and marriage ==
John Hanks was born near Beardstown, and near the Falls at Rough Creek, in Nelson County, Kentucky, on February 9, 1802. Four years later his family moved to Hardin County, Kentucky. Hanks married Susan Malinda Wilson in Kentucky in 1826. She was born on February 14, 1804, and died on March 11, 1863. (Note: Barton says Susan Malinda Wilson Hanks died March 11, 1865; Wilson says she died in 1863 and her gravestone says she died March 11, 1863.) Their children were William, Louis, Jane, Phelix, Emily, Mary Ellen and Levi.

== Thomas Lincoln family ==
Hanks lived in Indiana with Thomas Lincoln for four years from 1822 or 1823. While there, he and Abraham farmed corn and were hired out to split rails. He then traveled to Kentucky for a year or two. In 1828 settled in Macon County, Illinois, after having built the first house in Decatur, Illinois. It was he who persuaded Thomas to move to Illinois in 1830.

He worked alongside Abraham at his first job after he left home. Hanks and Abraham together went to New Orleans in 1831, as hired hands on a flatboat owned by Denton Offutt, Lincoln (and his stepbrother John D. Johnston) being hired at Hanks' recommendation. Hanks claims that he initiated the first speech for Lincoln, believing that he would deliver a better speech than the candidate running for office. Having heard the speech, the candidate urged Lincoln to continue giving speeches.

== Black Hawk war ==
Hanks served four or six months during the Black Hawk War of 1832, during which time he helped build a fort at Ottawa.

== 1860 Republican presidential campaign ==
=== Rail splitter campaign ===
When Abraham Lincoln was campaigning for the Republican nomination for the 1860 presidential election, Richard J. Oglesby sought a populist symbol to attach to Lincoln, and approached Hanks about the matter. Hanks told Oglesby, in response to being asked what kind of work Lincoln had been good at in his early years, "not much of any kind but dreaming, but he did help me [to] split a lot of rails when we made a clearing twelve miles west of here". The men went to the old Lincoln farm and retrieved some split fence rails.

On May 9, 1860, the opening day of the Republican convention in Decatur, Illinois, Oglesby addressed the crowd, announcing that "An old Democrat of Macon county [...] desire[s] to make a contribution to the Convention". At this cue, Hanks and Isaac Jennings carried two of the fence railings into the convention hall, which were tagged with a banner that read "Abraham Lincoln, the Rail Candidate for President in 1860. Two rails from a lot of three thousand made in 1830 by John Hanks and Abe Lincoln."

This election stunt had the side-effect of making Hanks into somewhat of a national celebrity. Supporters requested "genuine Lincoln rails" split by Hanks and Lincoln. Oglesby wrote certificates of authenticity of 72 "genuine" Lincoln rails that were dispatched on Hanks' behalf.

=== Rumor ===
The Democrats started a rumor that Hanks was not in fact going to vote for Lincoln come election time. They had come to that conclusion based upon his having voted for Stephen A. Douglas, the Democratic presidential hopeful, in 1858. Oglesby transcribed a letter in response for the illiterate Hanks, stating that he would be voting for Lincoln and why. The letter was condemned by Hanks' brother Charles and the Democrats, who were suspicious that it was written by someone else, some "smart Republican", on Hanks' behalf. Charles stated that he thought Hanks "even yet does not know what is in it, much less did he ever write it". It was decided that no more open letters by Hanks should be published, and instead Hanks took to making personal appearances in support of Lincoln on the campaign trail.

=== Political appointment request ===
After Lincoln's election, Hanks sought a political appointment in the new administration, again through Oglesby as a letter-writing intermediary, preferring to be an Indian agent. According to Henry Clay Whitney, Lincoln did give the matter some serious consideration, but did not appoint Hanks to any position. Hanks did visit the White House several times and attended Lincoln's inauguration.

== Civil War ==
When the American Civil War broke, Hanks enlisted as a teamster in the Illinois regiment under Ulysses S. Grant, despite being technically too old to enlist. Hanks never saw his first cousin, once removed, in the flesh again, but he did attend Lincoln's funeral.

== See also ==
- Lincoln family tree

== Bibliography ==
- Barton, William Eleazar (1920). The Paternity of Abraham Lincoln: Was He the Son of Thomas Lincoln? An Essay on the Chastity of Nancy Hanks. New York: George H. Doran Company.
- Bush, Harold (2011). Lincoln in His Own Time: A Biographical Chronicle of His Life, Drawn from Recollections, Interviews, and Memoirs by Family, Friends, and Associates. University of Iowa Press. ISBN 978-1609380458.
- Guelzo, Allen C. (2003). Abraham Lincoln: redeemer President. Wm. B. Eerdmans Publishing. ISBN 978-0-8028-4293-0.
- Plummer, Mark A. (2001). Lincoln's rail-splitter: Governor Richard J. Oglesby. University of Illinois Press. ISBN 978-0-252-02649-2.
- Tarbell, Ida M.; Davis, J. McCan (1896). The Early Life of Abraham Lincoln (reprinted Forgotten Books ed.). New York: S. S. McClure. ISBN 978-1-4400-7997-9.
- Wilson, Douglas Lawson; Davis, Rodney O.; Wilson, Terry; Herndon, William Henry; Weik, Jesse William (1998). Douglas Lawson Wilson; Rodney O. Davis; Terry Wilson (eds.). Herndon's Informants: Letters, Interviews, and Statements About Abraham Lincoln. University of Illinois Press. p. 779. ISBN 0252023285.
