= Health of Abraham Lincoln =

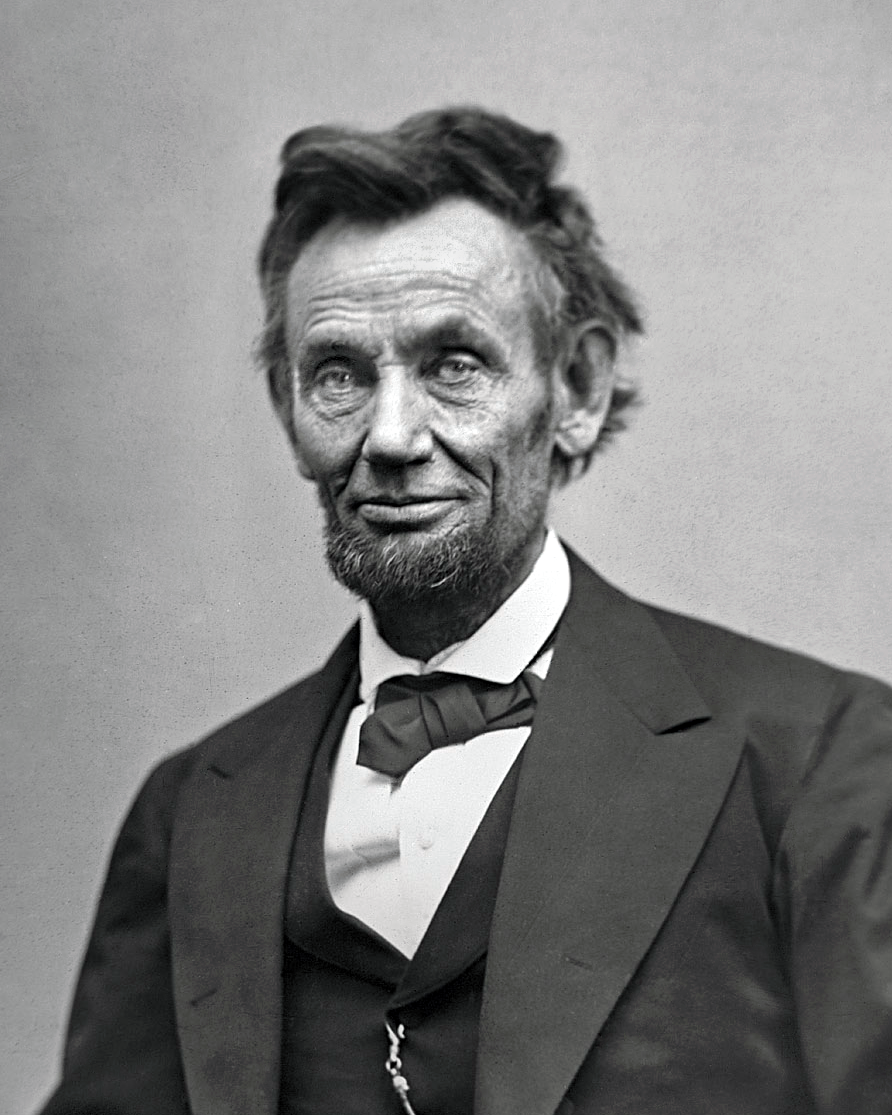
From Lincoln's last posed photo session, for Alexander Gardner, in February 1865

Abraham Lincoln's health has been the subject of both contemporaneous commentary and subsequent hypotheses by historians and scholars. Until middle age, his health was fairly good for the time. He contracted malaria in 1830 and 1835; the latter was the worse of the two cases. He contracted smallpox in 1863 during an 1863 to 1864 epidemic in Washington, D.C.

Throughout his life he experienced periods of depression, which could have been genetic, due to life experiences or trauma, or both. Lincoln took blue mass pills, which contained mercury. Based on his behavior and physical condition while taking the pills and after he quit taking them, Lincoln may have suffered from mercury poisoning.

It has been theorized that the symptoms and features Abraham Lincoln demonstrated a possible case of Marfan syndrome or multiple endocrine neoplasia type 2B, both rare genetic diseases. In particular, Lincoln's six-foot-four stature on a thin frame as well as his distinctively bony and asymmetrical facial structure have long caused suspicion of a genetic abnormality among historians. It is impossible to know if Lincoln would have suffered from the physiological defects of Marfan syndrome as he aged, as his assassination prevented any further progress of identifiable symptoms.

An individual with Marfan syndrome would have potential ailments such as an increased risk of spontaneous pneumothorax and aortic dissection, both of which are life-threatening medical emergencies. Assuming that Lincoln would have survived into older age and then proceeded to die of one of those conditons, it would be very likely that Marfan syndrome would be the answer to the mystery of Abraham Lincoln's physical health.

== Health and trauma ==
Despite the following occurrences, Lincoln's health up until middle age was fairly good for his day.

=== Trauma ===
When he was nine years old, Lincoln was kicked in the head by a horse at the Noah Gordon Mill and knocked unconscious for several hours. Other injuries or trauma throughout his life include almost severing a thumb with an axe, incurring frostbite of his feet in 1830–1831, being struck by his wife (apparently on multiple occasions), and being clubbed on the head during a robbery attempt in 1828. Lincoln was assassinated in 1865, dying from a bullet wound.

=== Infectious disease ===
- Malaria: Lincoln had malaria at least twice. The first was in 1830, along with the rest of his family. They had just arrived in Illinois that year. The second episode was in the summer of 1835, while living in New Salem. Lincoln was then so ill that he was sent to a neighbor's house to be medicated and cared for.
- Smallpox: November 18, 1863, while at the dedication of the Soldiers' National Cemetery, Lincoln was quite ill with smallpox. Long thought to have been only a mild case, recent work suggests it was a serious illness. Although it did not debilitate Lincoln, the disease did significantly affect his White House routine, and limited the advisors with whom he could meet. While caring for him, Lincoln's valet William H. Johnson contracted the disease and ultimately died in January 1864. Lincoln arranged and paid for Johnson to be buried. Some sources state his grave is at Arlington National Cemetery, but some recent investigators have argued that this is not the case.

=== Mental health ===
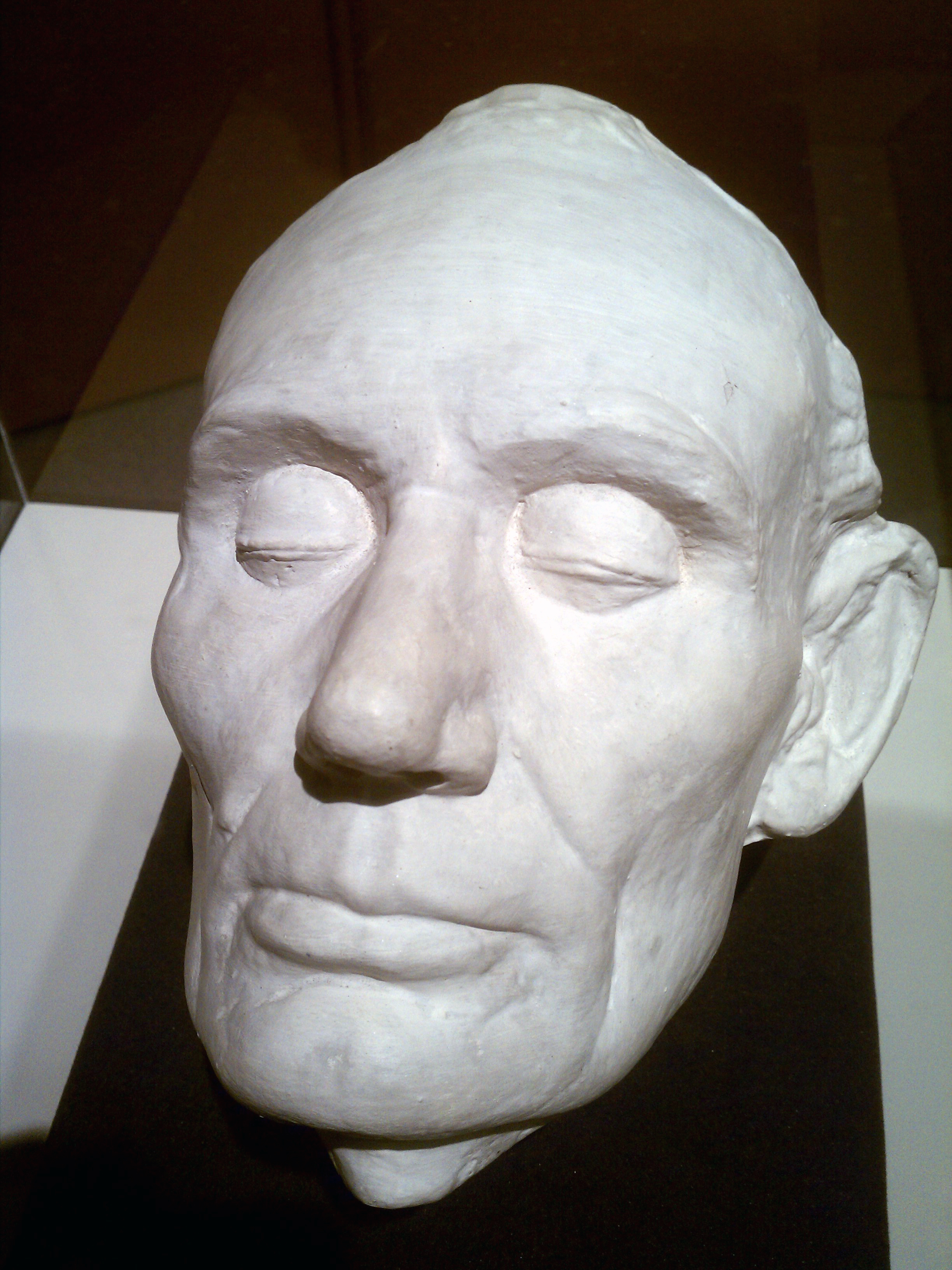
The 1860 life mask of Lincoln's face by sculptor Leonard Volk.

The 1865 life mask of Lincoln's face by sculptor Clark Mills.

Lincoln was contemporaneously described as suffering from melancholy, a condition that modern mental health professionals would characterize as clinical depression. Lincoln suffered from a depressed mood after major traumatic events, such as the death of Ann Rutledge in August 1835, the cessation of his (purported) engagement to Mary Todd Lincoln in January 1841 (after which several close associates feared Lincoln's suicide), (Note: It was during his time as an Illinois legislator that Joshua Fry Speed said Lincoln anonymously published a suicide poem in the Sangamo Journal; though he was not sure of the date, a suicide poem was published on August 25, 1838, making Lincoln 29 years of age. The poem is called The Suicide's Soliloquy; historians are still divided on whether or not Lincoln was the author.) and the Second Battle of Bull Run. During his life Lincoln experienced the death of multiple close family members, including his mother, his sister, and two of his sons, Eddie and Willie. Mary Lincoln felt her husband to be too trusting, and his melancholy tended to strike when he was betrayed or unsupported by those in whom he put faith. Whether he may have suffered from depression as a genetic predilection, a reaction to multiple emotional traumas in his life, or a combination thereof is the subject of much current conjecture.

Lincoln often combated his melancholic moods by delving into works of humor, likely a healthy coping mechanism for his depression.

=== Medication ===
The recollections of Lincoln's legal colleagues (John T. Stuart, Henry Clay Whitney, Ward Hill Lamon, and William Herndon) all agree that Lincoln took blue mass pills, which were commonly prescribed for hypochondriasis (Note: Ironically, Abraham Colles, an Irish physician, found in 1837 that long-term use of mercury would worsen hypochondriasis.) and melancholia. It has been used since the 16th century to treat syphilis and by the mid-19th century was prescribed for a wide variety of ills. The active ingredient of blue mass is elemental mercury – a substance now known to be a neurotoxin in its valproic state (Note: The way in which the mercury was processed for the blue mass pills directly correlated to how poisonous the pills would be. The authors of The National Dispensatory stated, "All agree that the efficacy of the [blue mass] preparation is proportionate… to the degree in which the metallic globules disappear.") and which has been known to be poisonous for centuries. (Note: The standard dose for blue mass pills was one pill two or three times a day. This would mean that the patient took in 130 to 185 mg of mercury. If absorbed, this would mean that the patient received 9,000 times the allowable amount of mercury that day, and the impact would compound with each additional day.)

Lincoln may have taken the blue mass pills for constipation, as well as hypochondriasis, or what has been called persistent constipation-melancholia complex. Both conditions were well known by his friends and family to have significantly affected Lincoln throughout his life. (Note: There is also conjecture that he took the blue mass pills for syphilis, however, it is considered unlikely that he had syphilis, due to the timing of initial infection and reemergence after four or five years later would have been exceedingly rare for secondary syphilis. Since fear of syphilis was common among patients with hypochondriasis, it is more likely that the issue was that Lincoln feared that he had syphilis.)

Authors of Abraham Lincoln's Blue Pills: Did Our 16th President Suffer from Mercury Poisoning? find that it is a reasonable assumption that Lincoln had experienced mercury poisoning due to the differences in his behavior and physical condition when he was taking the blue mass pills versus when he stopped taking the pills. When he was taking the blue mass pills, he was prone to outbursts of rage, bizarre behavior, memory loss, and insomnia. His hands trembled when he was under stress. Taking the medicine made Lincoln feel "cross". These issues, described in detail by those who were close to him, are common symptoms of mercury poisoning. When he stopped taking the medicine, and during a period of profound personal and professional stress, he "behaves like a saint". (Note: In 1865, speaking with the Washington correspondent of the Pittsburgh Chronicle, Mrs. Lincoln described an instance in which her husband's "usual medicine," the mercury-based blue pills made him terribly ill prior to his second inauguration. He was very pale, anxious, and bedridden for days. The correspondent recorded the interview as follows: Mrs. Lincoln "recalled the fact that her husband had been very ill, for several days, from the effects of a dose of blue pills taken shortly before his second inauguration." She said he was not well, and appearing to require his usual medicine, blue pills, she sent to the drug store in which Harrold was employed last and got a dose and gave them to him at night before going to bed, and that next morning his pallor terrified her. 'His face,' said she, pointing to the bed beside which she sat, 'was white as that pillow-case, as it lay just there,' she exclaimed, laying her hand on the pillow—'white, and such a deadly white; as he tried to rise he sank back again quite overcome!' She described his anxiety to be up, there was so much to do, and her persistence and his oppressive languor in keeping him in bed for several days; said he and she both thought it so strange that the pills should affect him in that way; they had never done so before, and both concluded they would get no more medicine there, as the attendant evidently did not understand making up prescriptions.") Lincoln may also have had long-term effects as the result of mercury poisoning, such as nerve damage that affected his gait.

Shortly after his 1861 inauguration, Lincoln had a sudden and disquieting outburst of rage during a White House conversation. Finding that the blue mass pills made him "cross", Lincoln stopped taking them about August 1861 (5 months after his March inauguration). Then his anger greatly diminished, so much so that he rarely expressed anger and then only when it was situationally appropriate.

The remarkable thing about Lincoln's temper is not how often it erupted, but how seldom it did, considering how frequently he encountered the insolence of epaulets, the abuse of friends and opponents alike, and the egomaniacal selfishness of editors, senators, representatives, governors, cabinet members, generals, and flocks of others who pestered him unmercifully about their own petty concerns.

— Thomas L. Carson, Lincoln's Ethics, Cambridge University Press, 2015, p. 246.

=== Body habitus ===
The habitus, or structure, of Lincoln's body attracted attention while he was alive, and continues to attract attention today among medical professionals.

- Height: as a child, Lincoln was tall, describing himself as "though very young, he was large of his age." He reached his adult height of 6 feet 4 inches (1.93 m) no later than age 21.
- Weight: although well-muscled as a young adult, he was always thin. Questionable evidence says Lincoln weighed over 200 pounds (91 kg) in 1831, but this is inconsistent with the emphatic statement of Henry Lee Ross ("The facts are Lincoln never weighed over 175 pounds in his life"), the recollection of David Turnham ("weighed about 160 lbs in 1830"), and a New Salem neighbor named Camron ("thin as a beanpole and ugly as a scarecrow"). Lincoln's self-reported weight was 180 pounds (82 kg) in 1859. He is believed to have weighed even less during his presidency.

The theory that Lincoln's facial asymmetries were a manifestation of craniofacial microsomia has been replaced with a possible diagnosis of left synostotic frontal plagiocephaly, which is a type of craniosynostosis.

== Genetic disorder theories ==
Claims have been made that Lincoln's health was declining before the assassination. These are often based on photographs of Lincoln appearing to show weight loss and muscle wasting. The theories are that he possibly suffered from multiple endocrine neoplasia type 2B (MEN2B) or Marfan syndrome, both of which are rare genetic disorders. DNA analyses of various items alleged to contain Lincoln's DNA were conducted for a few years starting in 2009 with unpromising and limited results.

=== Marfan syndrome ===
Based on Lincoln's unusual physical appearance, Dr. Abraham Gordon proposed in 1962 that Lincoln had Marfan syndrome. Testing Lincoln's DNA for Marfan syndrome was contemplated in the 1990s, but such a test was not performed.

Lincoln's unremarkable cardiovascular history and his normal visual acuity have been the chief objections to the hypothesis, and today geneticists consider the diagnosis unlikely.

=== Multiple endocrine neoplasia type 2B ===
In 2007, a theory was proposed that Lincoln could have had multiple endocrine neoplasia type 2B (MEN2B). This hypothesis suggested that Lincoln had major features of the disease: a marfanoid body shape, large, bumpy lips, constipation, hypotonia, and a history compatible with cancer. The mole on Lincoln's right cheek, the asymmetry of his face, his large jaw, his drooping eyelid, and pseudodepression were also suggested as manifestations of MEN2B. As a familial genetic disorder, the theory holds that other family members could possibly also have had MEN2B.

Lincoln's longevity is the principal challenge to the MEN2B theory: Lincoln lived long enough to be assassinated at age 56. Untreated MEN2B is understood to result in death fairly young, usually by the age of 21.

== Debunked theories ==
=== Syphilis ===
Claims that Lincoln had syphilis around 1835 have been controversial. (Note: Lincoln's law partner, friend and biographer William Herndon said that Lincoln told him that he contracted the disease. It has been suggested by historian Charles B. Strozier that if Lincoln told Herndon that he had syphilis, it was likely due to his ignorance, confusion, or fear of having caught syphilis.) Syphilis was a common worry among young men before the introduction of penicillin because syphilis was somewhat common in that era. Physicians likened the fear of syphilis, syphilophobia, to the modern fear of AIDS, which was also deadly and is still incurable.

Writing in 2003, biographer David Donald declared, "Modern physicians who have sifted the evidence agree that Lincoln never contracted the disease." For instance, he did not have any of the signs of tertiary syphilis. Physicians suggest that he had syphilophobia.

=== Spinocerebellar ataxia ===
The theory that Lincoln was afflicted with type 5 spinocerebellar ataxia is no longer accepted.

== Bibliography ==
- Donald, David Herbert (1996) [1995]. Lincoln. New York: Simon and Schuster. ISBN 978-0-684-82535-9.
- Hayden, Deborah (2003). Pox: Genius, Madness, and the Mysteries of Syphilis. New York: Perseus Publishing. ISBN 978-0-465-02881-8.
- Schreiner, Samuel Agnew (2005) [1987]. The Trials of Mrs. Lincoln. University of Nebraska Press. ISBN 978-0-8032-9325-0.
- Schroeder-Lein, Glenna R. (2012). Lincoln and Medicine. Carbondale and Edwardsville, Illinois: Southern Illinois University Press. ISBN 978-0-8093-3194-9. Concise Lincoln Library.
- Sotos, John G. (2008). The Physical Lincoln. Mt. Vernon Book Systems. ISBN 978-0-9818193-2-7.
- Sotos, John G. (2008). The Physical Lincoln Sourcebook. Mt. Vernon Book Systems. ISBN 978-0-9818193-3-4. Full-text index here.
- White Jr., Ronald C. (2009). A. Lincoln: A Biography. Random House, Inc. ISBN 978-1-4000-6499-1.
