= Petersburg Historic District (Illinois) =

Historic district in Illinois, United States

- U.S. National Register of Historic Places
- U.S. Historic district
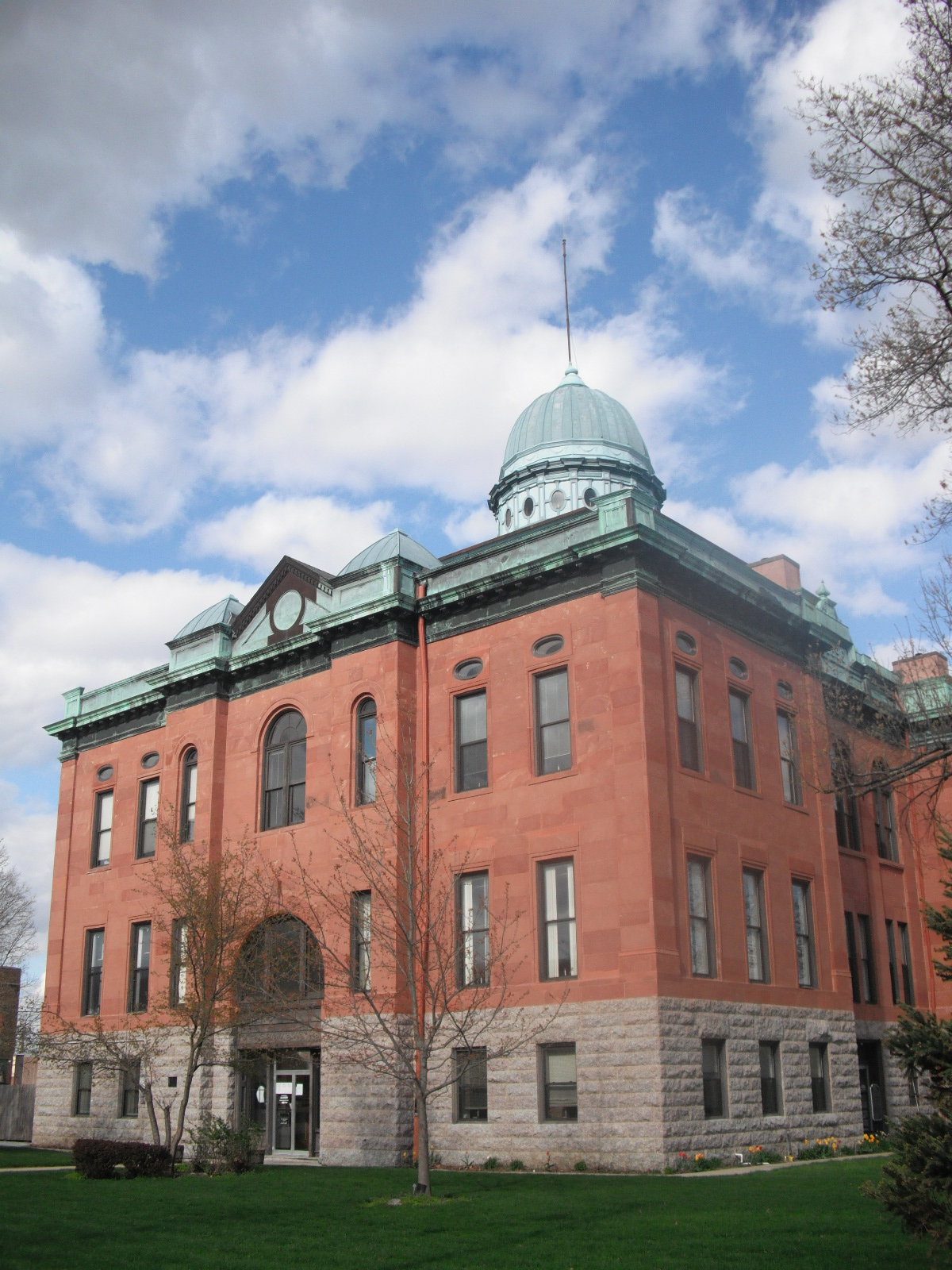
- Menard County Courthouse

- Location within Illinois Location within the United States
- Location: Petersburg, Illinois
- Coordinates: 40°0′27″N 89°51′10″W
- Area: 34 acres (14 ha)
- Architectural style: Greek Revival, Italianate, Queen Anne
- NRHP reference No.: 76000722
- Added to NRHP: June 17, 1976

The Petersburg Historic District is a historic district which includes most of Petersburg, Illinois. The district originally included 24 contributing buildings, the Oakland Cemetery, and a survey marker; the Smoot Hotel was later added to the district. The buildings in the district are a mixture of homes and commercial buildings. The earliest building in the district was built in 1826, while the latest were built in the 1890s. The Italianate style is the predominant architectural style in the district; other styles represented in the district include the Federal style in its early buildings, the Greek Revival style in buildings from the mid-1800s, and the Queen Anne style in buildings from the end of the century. Several of the sites in the district are associated with Abraham Lincoln; the survey marker marks the point where Lincoln began his survey of Petersburg, Ann Rutledge is buried in Oakland Cemetery, and residents of the other buildings included Lincoln's tutor and a gunsmith who operated out of Lincoln's New Salem store.

The district was added to the National Register of Historic Places on June 17, 1976.
