= The Jazz Man =

American children's book

- First edition
- Author: Mary Hays Weik
- Illustrator: Ann Grifalconi
- Language: English
- Publisher: Atheneum Books
- Publication date: 1966
- Publication place: United States
- Media type: Print
- Pages: 42 pp

The Jazz Man is a children's book written by Mary Hays Weik and illustrated by her daughter Ann Grifalconi. The book was published by Atheneum Books in 1966 and received a Newbery Honor in 1967. A second edition was published in 1993 by Aladdin Books.The Jazz Man has also been published in Germany and South Africa.

== Plot summary ==
The Jazz Man is the story of a nine-year-old boy named Zeke, who lives with his parents on the top floor of a brownstone in Harlem. The story begins with Zeke remembering an old home he used to live in down South. He later explains how the five flights of stairs he usually walked up to get home made his "legs ache beat hot and fast when he first came to live there." Over time, he got used to the stairs, but the stairs still troubled his mother. At night, when she returned from work, he would often hear her struggling to climb up the long flights of stairs.

One of Zeke's legs is shorter than the other, and "the kids downstairs stared at his lame foot and made him feel hot and different." Because of this, Zeke skipped school most of the time and remained in his apartment staring at windows across the courtyard. He becomes intrigued by an apartment with a window that is always closed. He watches this window for a while, contemplating who might be moving into the apartment. Eventually, a man with a piano moves in. Zeke calls him the Jazz Man. The Jazz Man plays all day and night.

Zeke enjoys the music with his family. The Jazz Man's music helps Zeke's mother forget her tiredness and her inability to pay the rent. It also helps Zeke's father forget about his unemployment. Zeke watches as the Jazz Man jams with his friends, who play the saxophone, drums, and trumpet.

As summer ends, Zeke's mother starts to get more and more irritated by the stairs. She argues with Zeke's father because of his recurrent unemployment. That night, Zeke's mother cries while reading him a bedtime story.

The next morning Zeke's mother leaves and doesn't return, forcing Zeke and his father to learn how to survive on their own. Soon, Zeke's father begins neglecting his duties at home and at times stays out for many days without leaving Zeke any food. Zeke becomes quieter and skinnier. He tells his neighbors that his mother left to visit her rich aunt, but everyone, including Zeke, knows that this is a lie.

After a while, Zeke realizes he hasn't heard from the Jazz Man for some time and looks across the courtyard, only to see that he has left the apartment. Zeke leaves his building one morning and walks across the street. He finds the Jazz Man playing with his friends at a large party. Confused, Zeke pinches himself and wakes up to his father's voice. Zeke is with his mother and father listening to the Jazz Man from their window. Zeke realizes that he has been dreaming the entire time.

== Character List ==
Zeke – A nine-year-old boy who lives in Harlem. One of his legs is shorter than his other leg, and he spends most of his time listening to the Jazz Man instead of going to school.

Zeke's Mother – She works many hours and often comes home tired. She dances when she is happy.

Zeke's Father – He is unemployed.

Tony – One of the men who plays music with the Jazz Man. He is Italian and plays the trumpet.

Ernie – An African American man who plays the saxophone and plays with the Jazz Man sometimes.

Manuel – Another friend of the Jazz Man who plays the drums.

Mrs. Dowdy – One of Zeke's neighbors from across the courtyard. She lives in the apartment with clean, shiny windows and fancy curtains.

Lispie – A girl who "had been born without all her brains." She lives across the street from Zeke in the apartment with the crooked green blinds.

Old Bill – A man who lives across the courtyard from Zeke in the apartment with the dirty, cracked window. He drinks from his brown bottle all day and curses at anyone he catches looking at him.

== Critical reception ==
The Jazz Man has received mainly positive reviews from critics. The woodcut drawings by Ann Grifalconi were praised and the book was named one of The New York Times Best Illustrated Children's Books of the Year in 1966. When speaking about the end of The Jazz Man in her book African and African American Images in Newbery Award Winning Titles: Progress in Portrayals, Binnie Tate Wilkin wrote: "The author captures enough of city flavors to entice the reader and adds elements of pathos and a harsher reality through the dream. Skillfully done." In Zena Sutherland's book, The Best in Children's Books: The University of Chicago Guide to Children's Literature, 1966-72, she writes that: "The author has done an excellent job of showing with verisimilitude the grim facts of mores among the disadvantaged in the inner city." The Newbery Honor book also received some mixed critiques. Kirkus Reviews stated: "The author does make you feel and is ably backed by the distinctive woodcuts of the illustrator. Our Harlem to Watts children may be able to recognize their circumstances in this, but it's complacent suburbia where better missionary use of the book could be made."
