= The Suicide's Soliloquy =

Poem

- by Anonymous (possibly Abraham Lincoln)
- Publisher: The Sangamo Journal
- Publication date: August 25, 1838

"The Suicide's Soliloquy" is an unsigned poem, possibly written by Abraham Lincoln, first published on August 25, 1838, in The Sangamo Journal, a four-page Whig newspaper in Springfield, Illinois.

Shortly after Lincoln's assassination, one of Lincoln's personal friends, Joshua Speed, told William Herndon, Lincoln's biographer, that Lincoln had written and published "a few lines under the gloomy title of Suicide", although the article had never been found. In 1997, independent writer Richard Lawrence Miller found The Suicide's Soliloquy and, in 2002, came to realize that it matched the descriptions of Lincoln's missing article. Although it seems to follow the same themes and style as Lincoln's other works, there is still controversy over whether it was actually written by Lincoln.

== Lincoln authorship controversy ==
=== Arguments in favor of Lincoln authorship ===
The poem was published in the Sangamo Journal, a newspaper in which Lincoln had previously published other works. The poem uses a similar meter, sync, dictation and tone with many other poems published by Lincoln and according to Richard Miller, the man who discovered the poem, the theme of the interplay between rationality and madness is "especially Lincolnian in spirit". In addition to this, many of the symptoms of depression that Lincoln expressed in letters and other writings are discussed in this poem. For example, one of Lincoln's symptoms was described as a "storm in his brain, punctuated by thunderclaps of thought--self-critical, fearful, despairing". He also wrote of an "intensity of thought, which will some times wear the sweetest idea thread-bare and turn it to the bitterness of death". In the poem, the narrator exclaims, "To ease me of this power to think,/ That through my bosom raves,/ I'll headlong leap from hell's high brink,/ And wallow in its waves." Although some doubt remains around the authorship of the poem, one Lincoln scholar said, "It looks like Lincoln. It sounds like Lincoln. It probably is Lincoln."

=== Arguments against Lincoln authorship ===
There is a general lack of agreement on the year the poem was published. In William Herndon's interview with Joshua Speed, one of Lincoln's closest friends, Speed initially said that the lost poem was published in 1840 or 1841 before settling on 1838. However an early authoritative biography by Jesse W. Weik, assembled largely from Herndon's writings, stated that the lost Lincoln poem was published in 1841. Thus Lincoln biographers assumed it had followed Lincoln’s suicidal breakdown in 1841, known to historians as the “fatal first of January.” However there was a period during 1835 when Lincoln's friends became concerned for his safety due to his talk of suicide following the death of a friend, Ann Rutledge, from typhoid fever. "The Suicide's Soliloquy" was published on the third anniversary of Rutledge's funeral, the point at which acquaintances first noticed that Lincoln was suffering from a depressive episode.
