= Ann Rutledge =

American woman associated with Abraham Lincoln (1813–1835)

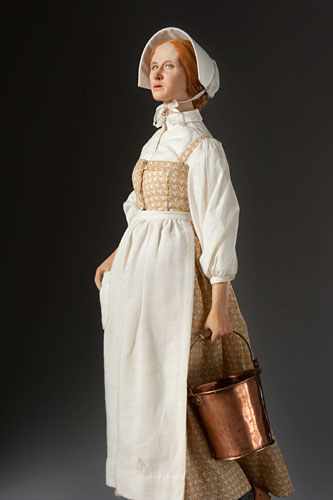
- A likeness by artist and historian George S. Stuart created from her physical description mentioned in historical records. No known painting of Ann Rutledge exists from life.
- Born: January 7, 1813; Henderson, Kentucky, US
- Died: August 25, 1835 (aged 22); New Salem, Illinois, US
- Burial place: Old Concord Burial Ground, Petersburg, Illinois (1835–1890); Oakland Cemetery, Petersburg, Illinois (1890–present)
- Known for: Alleged romantic relationship with Abraham Lincoln
- Partner: John McNamar (?–1835)(engaged but not married)

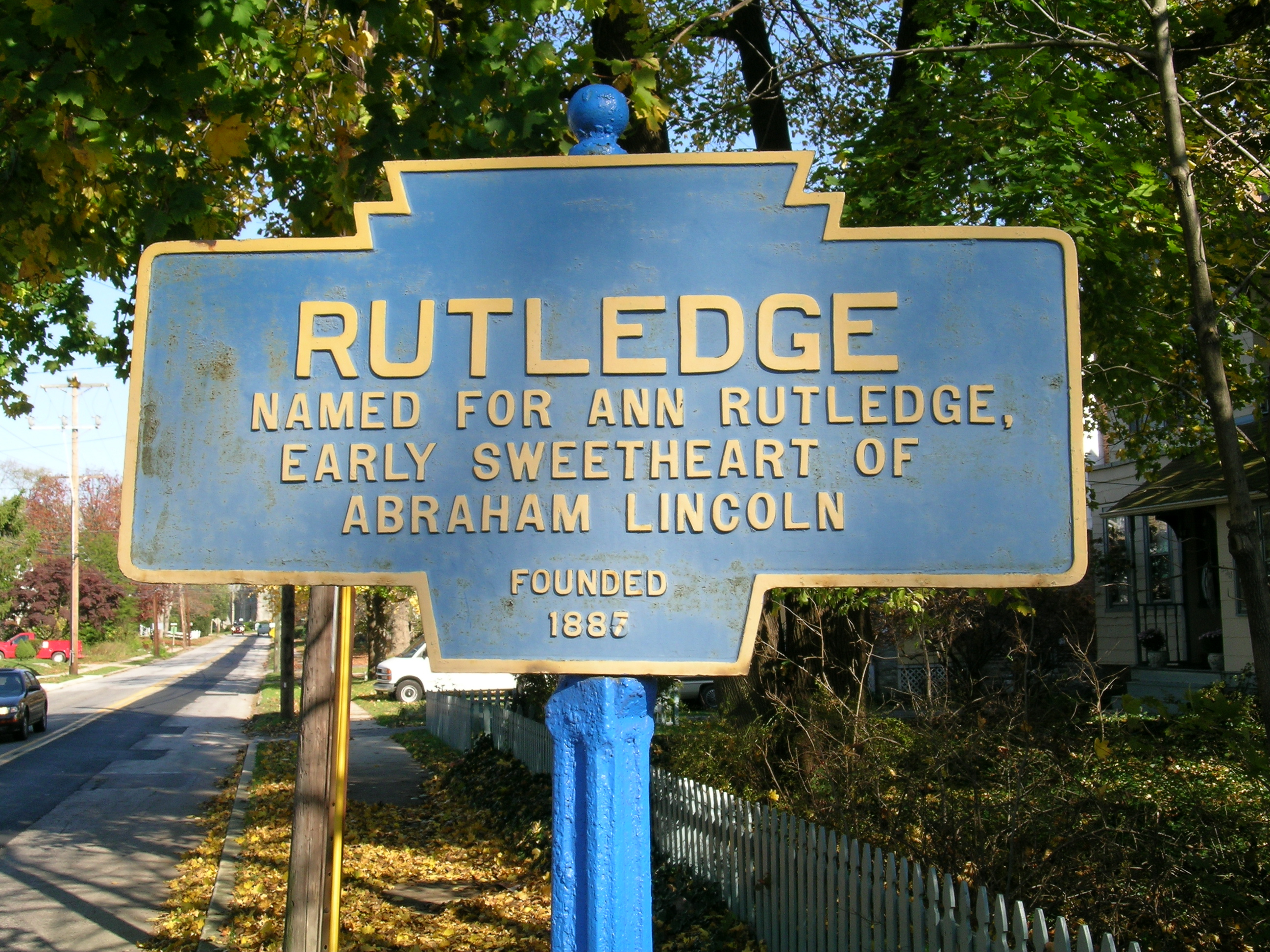
A Keystone Marker for Rutledge, Pennsylvania, named after Ann Rutledge

Ann Mayes Rutledge (January 7, 1813 – August 25, 1835) was an American woman who was allegedly Abraham Lincoln's first love.

== Early life ==
Born near Henderson, Kentucky, Ann Mayes Rutledge was the third of 10 children born to Mary Ann Miller Rutledge and James Rutledge. In 1829, her father, along with John M. Cameron, founded New Salem, Illinois.

== Alleged romantic relationship with Lincoln ==
Many of the facts of her life are lost to history, but some historians believe that she was the first love of Abraham Lincoln. The exact nature of the Lincoln–Rutledge relationship has been debated by historians and non-historians since 1866.

John McNamar (aka McNeil, 1801–1879), was, according to his son, engaged to marry Ann Rutledge. But McNamar left for New York to bring his family to Illinois and promised to marry Rutledge upon his return. According to his son, "While absent he was taken with a fever and was away three years. In the meantime Ann and Abraham Lincoln became engaged, thinking my father dead. My father, however, returned before the wedding came off." For a time Rutledge and McNamar exchanged letters, but his letters became more formal and "less ardent in tone" and eventually ceased completely. McNamar (who owned the land on which the Rutledges were tenants) never married Rutledge. After she died he married his first wife in 1838.

== Death and burial ==
In 1835, a wave of typhoid hit the town of New Salem. Ann Rutledge died at the age of 22 on August 25, 1835. This left Lincoln severely depressed. Historian John Y. Simon reviewed the historiography of the subject and concluded, "Available evidence overwhelmingly indicates that Lincoln so loved Ann that her death plunged him into severe depression." An anonymous poem about suicide, "The Suicide's Soliloquy", published locally exactly three years after her death, is widely attributed to Lincoln.

After Lincoln's first election as president, Isaac Cogdal, a friend of Lincoln's, ventured to ask whether it was true that Lincoln had fallen in love with Ann. Lincoln is said to have replied:

It is true—true indeed I did. I loved the woman dearly and soundly: she was a handsome girl—would have made a good, loving wife.... I did honestly and truly love the girl and think often—often of her now.

Ann Mayes Rutledge was laid to rest in the Old Concord Burial Ground; however, the body was exhumed and then buried in the Oakland Cemetery in Petersburg, Illinois, when an undertaker became financially interested in the cemetery in 1890. In January 1921, the small, rough stone marking Rutledge's grave was replaced with a granite monument inscribed with the text of the poem "Anne Rutledge," from Edgar Lee Masters's Spoon River Anthology:

Out of me unworthy and unknown
The vibrations of deathless music:
"With malice toward none, with charity toward all."
Out of me the forgiveness of millions toward millions,
And the beneficent face of a nation
Shining with justice and truth.
I am Ann Rutledge who sleeps beneath these weeds,
Beloved in life of Abraham Lincoln,
Wedded to him, not through union,
But through separation.
Bloom forever, O Republic,
From the dust of my bosom!

As Lincoln's biographer, Masters reported "very little to be found to justify" the story of Ann Rutledge, and that Lincoln was never "deeply attached" to any woman.

== Post-mortem allegations of Lincoln relationship ==
=== William Herndon's account ===
After Lincoln's assassination in 1865, his friend and law partner William Herndon first revealed the story of the supposed romance between Rutledge and Lincoln, much to Mary Todd Lincoln's anger and dismay. However, Herndon despised Mary Todd Lincoln and may have fabricated or enhanced the story of a romance between Ann Rutledge and Abraham Lincoln to serve as a "thorn in the side" of Mary Todd Lincoln. Abraham Lincoln's surviving son Robert Todd Lincoln was also upset by Herndon's claim. Most of Herndon's sources came from interviews with Lincoln's early friends in New Salem and Ann's relatives. The story was later repeated by Herndon in several lectures and books.

=== Historical controversy ===
Since Herndon first made his claims about Lincoln's relationship with Rutledge public in 1866, the nature of the relationship has become, and remained, a matter of historical controversy. An anonymous poem about suicide published locally three years after her death is widely attributed to Lincoln.

Through the 1920s, Lincoln biographers generally repeated and elaborated on Herndon's claims that the relationship was romantic, including Ward Hill Lamon, Albert J. Beveridge, and Carl Sandburg. However, in the 1930s and 1940s, an increasing professionalism in Lincoln studies was attended by increasing skepticism of the story of Lincoln and Rutledge's romance, and increased scrutiny of the evidence presented for it. While no major biographers have denied that Lincoln and Rutledge were close, several historians have claimed that the evidence of a love affair between them is tenuous at best. Benjamin P. Thomas's 1934 book Lincoln's New Salem raised doubts about Lincoln's alleged love for Rutledge, and Thomas later affirmed that while "Lincoln students can scarcely declare with certainty that no such romance took place," "most of them regard it as improbable, and reject utterly its supposed enduring influence upon Lincoln." In the second volume of his four-volume biography Lincoln the President (1945–55), historian James G. Randall included an appendix entitled "Sifting the Ann Rutledge Evidence," which cast doubt on the nature of her and Lincoln's relationship. Biographer Stephen B. Oates flatly denied a Lincoln-Rutledge romance, writing in 1977 that "there is no evidence that Ann and Lincoln ever had anything more than a platonic relationship."

The story of a Lincoln-Rutledge romance was not taken seriously by most Lincoln scholars after the mid-1940s, with the "agnostic" position (that a romance between Lincoln and Rutledge is not impossible, but that there is not enough evidence to affirm that it happened) predominant. However, scholarly interest in and support for the supposed romance underwent a revival in the 1990s, which saw the publication of new defenses of the "traditional" narrative of Lincoln and Rutledge's romance by scholars such as John Y. Simon, Douglas L. Wilson, and John Evangelist Walsh. Since then, the matter has once again been in dispute, with the romance narrative being accepted by some Lincoln scholars and biographers, such as Michael Burlingame and Doris Kearns Goodwin, but rejected by skeptics such as Lewis Gannett and David Herbert Donald. (Note: Donald gave qualified support to the story in his Lincoln (1995), but later firmly disavowed it in his 2003 book We Are Lincoln Men: Abraham Lincoln and His Friends.) Gannett wrote in 2005 that "Nearly sixty years after James G. Randall delivered a seeming coup de grâce to the Ann Rutledge legend, the legend may be nearing a second death," but in 2010 conceded that "One might conclude that Wilson's interpretation is unassailable," noting continuing scholarly support for the thesis. In 2004, historian John Y. Simon reviewed the historiography of the subject and concluded that "Available evidence overwhelmingly indicates that Lincoln so loved Ann that her death plunged him into severe depression. More than a century and a half after her death, when significant new evidence cannot be expected, she should take her proper place in Lincoln biography."

Increasing academic interest in Lincoln and Rutledge's relationship has, however, been inversely paralleled by diminishing popular interest and investment, reflecting shifting ideological concerns and conceptions of Lincoln; Ann Rutledge, and the controversy over her mooted romance with Lincoln, are today relatively obscure.

== In popular culture ==
The 1930 D. W. Griffith film Abraham Lincoln features Rutledge as a main character, played by Una Merkel.

Actress Pauline Moore plays Ann Rutledge in John Ford's 1939 film Young Mr. Lincoln. Following Ann's death, Lincoln (Henry Fonda) visits her graveside and makes the fateful decision to leave home and pursue a law practice in Springfield.

Actress Mary Howard played Ann Rutledge in John Cromwell's 1940 film Abe Lincoln in Illinois. The film was adaptation of a play where Rutledge was played on Broadway by Adele Longmire. It was revived on Broadway in 1993–94 with Rutledge portrayed by Marissa Chibas.

The February 13, 1949, episode of the radio series Quiet Please entitled "Valentine" tells a fictionalized version of the romance between Ann Rutledge (Anne Seymour) and Abraham Lincoln (Ernest Chappell). Narrated by Abe, he tells of his journeys away from home where Annie has been awaiting his return for many months. Promising himself he will "write her back tomorrow," he never followed through and wonders how he will be able to face her after being away so long without communication. As he nears home, he stops to purchase a Valentine for her, but is interrupted when she arrives at the store. He hides, and she purchases the last remaining Valentine for him. They proclaim their love for each other later that day. The episode was written by Wyllis Cooper and also featured Jack Arthur as Offutt and Leora Thatcher as Hannah, with music by Albert Buhrmann.

The Lincoln-Rutledge relationship plays an important part in the growth of Lincoln in Seth Grahame-Smith's novel Abraham Lincoln, Vampire Hunter. In it, MacNamar is a vampire. When he learns that Rutledge has fallen in love with Lincoln, he returns to New Salem and kills her by infecting her. The symptoms of her infection resemble those of typhoid fever.

An earlier, more traditional novel on the subject is Bernie Babcock's The Soul of Ann Rutledge, Abraham Lincoln's Romance, published in 1919.

In the 2016 TV movie series Signed, Sealed and Delivered, in episode 6 "From the Heart," the Postables find a valentine from Ann to Abe telling him goodbye, and the episode mentions Abe's visiting her while she was ill.

== General and cited works ==
- Donald, David Herbert (1995). Lincoln. New York: Touchstone. ISBN 0-684-80846-3.
- Herndon, William Henry (1949) [1888]. Herndon's Life of Lincoln. Cleveland, Ohio: The World Publishing Company. Chapter 6, pp. 105–115, covers Rutledge, McNamar, and Lincoln.
- Herndon, William H. (1910). Abraham Lincoln. Miss Ann Rutledge. New Salem. Pioneering and The Poem: A Lecture Delivered in the Old Sangamon County Court House, November, 1866. Springfield, Illinois.
