= Tillie S. Pine =

Polish-born US author of children's books

Tillie Schloss Pine (4 March 1896 – 1999) was an American writer of children's books in the 20th century.

Pine was born in Pułtusk, in Poland, on 4 March 1896. She was the daughter of Louis and Rachel Schloss. After the family moved to New York City, she married Nat Pine in 1924.

Pine is recognized for her children’s science and multi-cultural books, primarily illustrated by Ezra Jack Keats, that saw printed editions spanning several decades and set in multiple languages. Most of her books follow a similar theme; describing traditional cultural processes and techniques and how they are in practice in contemporary sciences. Pine worked closely with fellow author Joseph Levine in producing her works. Pine, Keats, and Levine were all of Jewish background.

Pine died in 1999 at age 102.

== Selected works ==
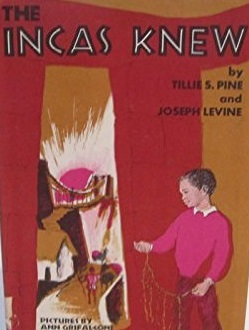
The Incas Knew by Tillie S. Pine and Joseph Levine. Artwork by Ann Grifalconi

- The Indians Knew (First published in 1957, Whittlesey House, New York)
- The Pilgrims Knew (Whittlesey House, New York, 1957)
- Simple machines and how we use them (first published in 1965, Whittlesey House, New York)
- Magnets and how to use them (first published in 1958, Whittlesey House, New York)
- The Eskimos Knew (first published in 1962, Whittlesey House, New York)
- The Chinese Knew (first published in 1958, Whittlesey House, New York)
- Measurements and how we use them (McGraw-Hill, 1974)
- Gravity all around (Whittlesey House, New York, 1963)
- The Egyptians Knew (McGraw-Hill, 1964)
- The Incas Knew (McGraw-Hill, 1968)
- The Africans Knew (McGraw-Hill, 1967)
- Friction all around (first published in 1960, Whittlesey House, New York)
- The Maya Knew (McGraw-Hill, 1971)
- Water all around (first published in 1959, Whittlesey House, New York)
- Energy all around (McGraw-Hill, 1975)
- Rocks and how we use them (McGraw-Hill, 1967)
- Scientists and their discoveries (first published in 1978, McGraw-Hill)
- Air all around (first published in 1960, Whittlesey House, New York)
- The Polynesians Knew (first published in 1974, McGraw-Hill)
- Sounds all around (first published in 1958, Whittlesey House, New York)
