= Lincoln-Berry General Store =

General store owned by Abraham Lincoln and Willam F Berry

Coordinates: 39.979104°N 89.841518°W

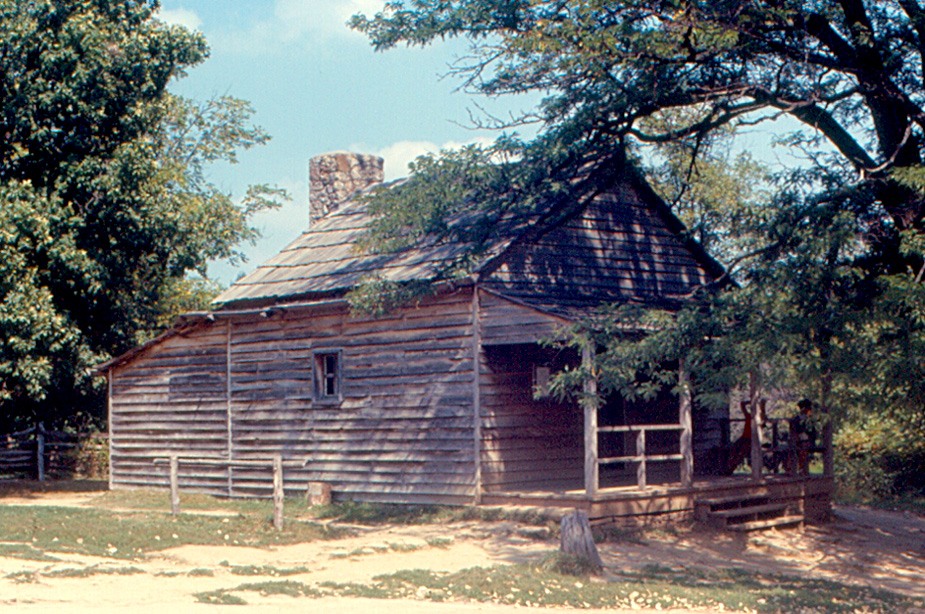
- Industry: General store
- Founded: 1832
- Defunct: 1834
- Area served: New Salem, Illinois
- Owner: Abraham Lincoln; William F. Berry

The Lincoln-Berry General Store was a general store that was co-owned by Abraham Lincoln. The store is one of the reconstructed 1830s buildings at Lincoln's New Salem, a state historic site. It was and is the only frame (not log) building in New Salem.

== History ==
In January 1832, 23-year-old Lincoln and 21-year-old William F. Berry, a member of Lincoln's militia company during the Black Hawk War, purchased one of the three general stores in New Salem from James and Rowan Herndon. The two men signed personal notes to purchase the business and a later acquisition of another store's inventory.

The store sold general merchandise, such as apparel, dry goods, hardware, home furnishings, and a selection of food, including takeout meals for stage passengers. For a short time, the two men were thriving merchants. Lincoln often slept in the back room of the store after a long night of reading.

Lincoln described the store in his 1860 autobiography, writing in the third person: "He studied what he should do -- thought of learning the blacksmith trade -- thought of trying to study law --rather thought he could not succeed at that without a better education. Before long, strangely enough, a man offered to sell, and did sell, to Abraham and another as poor as himself, an old stock of goods, upon credit. They opened as merchants; and he says that was the store."

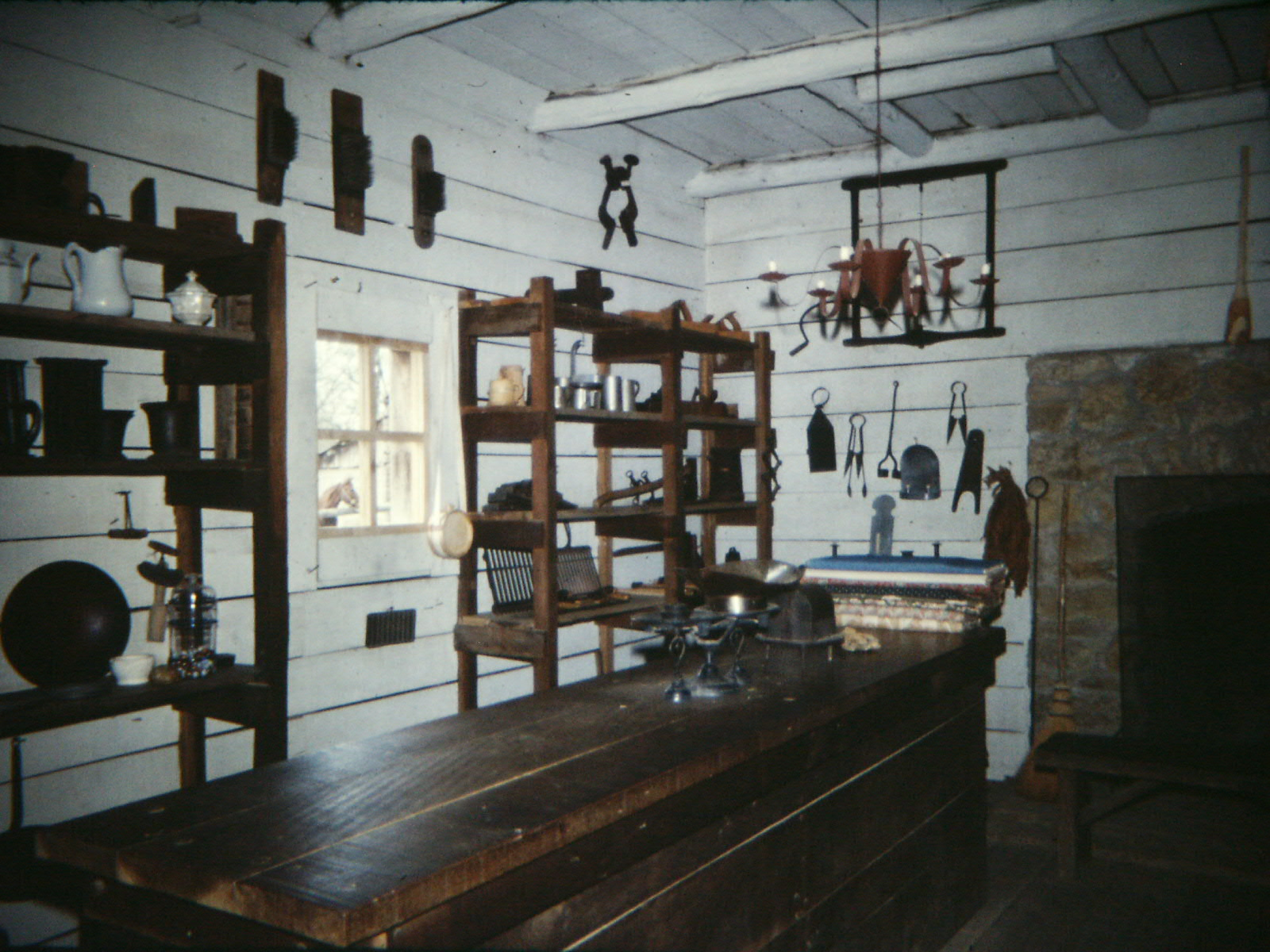
Interior of General Store

In January, Berry applied for a liquor license costing 7 dollars, and the establishment became a tavern as well. As licensed bartenders, Berry and Lincoln sold liquor at 12 cents a pint. The venture added revenue to the business but was not enough to keep it profitable.

By 1833, New Salem was no longer a growing community; the Sangamon River proved to be inadequate for commercial transportation and no roads or railroads allowed easy access to other markets. Adding to the stresses on the business, Berry became an alcoholic and was often too drunk to work, requiring Lincoln to run the store by himself.

Historians have claimed that "local tradition maintained that disagreement over the sale of liquor caused the dissolution of the Lincoln-Berry partnership soon after they obtained the liquor license." Lincoln sold his share of the business to Berry in 1833, which closed the following year. After Berry's death in 1835, Lincoln was left with a business debt of $1,100.00 ( $40,000.00 in 2024) that he was not able to pay off until becoming a member of the United States House of Representatives in 1847.

== Legacy ==
At the first of the Lincoln–Douglas debates in Ottawa, Illinois, on August 21, 1858, Stephen Douglas derided Lincoln for operating a "grocery", a euphemism for a tavern.

Lincoln told customers when the quality of a particular product was not very good, and according to local legend, Lincoln once took 6 cents too much from a customer and walked three miles to return the money. Lincoln's work as an everyman's store clerk and trustworthy business owner helped lead to his nickname as "Honest Abe".

The 1930 film Abraham Lincoln features Lincoln's time as a storekeeper at the Lincoln-Berry store during the first act.

The 1933–1934 Chicago World's Fair included a replica building exhibit of the Lincoln-Berry store.

A 1928 Frank Schoonover painting of Lincoln working in the store is on display in the Norman Rockwell Museum.

The opening scene of the 1939 film Young Mr. Lincoln is set in the Lincoln-Berry store.

== See also ==
- Early life and career of Abraham Lincoln
