= Ain't Nobody a Stranger to Me =

2007 book by Ann Grifalconi

- Author: Ann Grifalconi
- Illustrator: Jerry Pinkney
- Language: English
- Genre: Children's literature, picture book, African-American history
- Published: 2007 (Hyperion Books for Children)
- Publication place: United States
- Media type: Print (hardback, paperback)
- Pages: 32 (unpaginated)
- ISBN: 9780786818570
- OCLC: 86222232

Ain't Nobody a Stranger to Me is a 2007 picture book by Ann Grifalconi and illustrator Jerry Pinkney about an old man telling his granddaughter of he and his young family's journey to freedom with assistance from the Underground Railroad.

== Reception ==
School Library Journal (SLJ), in a review of Ain't Nobody a Stranger to Me, wrote "While this is not the author's or illustrator's strongest effort, educators in schools and churches will find uses for the Good Samaritan lessons presented throughout." Publishers Weekly called it a "resonant, moving story" and concluded "An inspired collaboration."

Ain't Nobody a Stranger to Me has also been reviewed by The Horn Book Magazine, Booklist, Kirkus Reviews, Black Issues Book Review, and The Reading Teacher.

== Awards ==
- 2007 The Society of School Librarians International Language Arts - Picture Books Award - honor
- 2008 Horace Mann Upstanders Award - honor
- 2010 AGHE Book Award for Best Children’s Literature on Aging: Elementary Reader - winner
