= Theodore Edward Coneys =

American murderer (1882–1967)

- Born: November 10, 1882; Petersburg, Illinois, U.S.
- Died: May 16, 1967 (aged 84); Colorado State Penitentiary in Cañon City, Colorado, U.S.
- Other name: Denver Spiderman
- Parent(s): Thomas H. Coneys; Isabella Coneys (née Elam)
- Status: Deceased
- Conviction: First-degree murder
- Penalty: Life imprisonment without the possibility of parole

Details
- Victims: Philip Peters, aged 73
- Date: October 17, 1941; 84 years ago
- Locations: Denver, Colorado, U.S.
- Date apprehended: July 20, 1942

Theodore Edward Coneys (November 10, 1882 – May 16, 1967), also known by the nickname "Denver Spiderman", was an American drifter who committed the murder of a man whose house he was illegally occupying in 1941, and continued occupying the attic of the victim's home for nine months.

== Early life ==
Theodore Coneys was born November 10, 1882, in Petersburg, Illinois, to Thomas H. Coneys (November 18, 1844 – July 1, 1888), a Canadian immigrant who owned a hardware store in Petersburg, and his wife, Isabella Elam (March 1, 1851 – April 14, 1911). After the elder Coneys died in 1888, Mrs. Coneys and her son moved to a farm near Beloit, Wisconsin, then to Denver, Colorado, in 1907, where she worked as a housekeeper at the Denver Democratic Club. She died in 1911.

Theodore Coneys suffered from poor health and had been told by doctors not to expect to see his 18th birthday, so he did not finish high school. As an adult, he worked as a bookkeeper at the Denver Brass Works in advertising and sales, yet spent much of his adult life homeless. Coneys resented the way he was treated by others for his frail condition, later expressing that he wanted a place where he could be alone and free from the judgment of others.

== Criminal career ==
In September 1941, 58-year-old Theodore Coneys intended to ask former acquaintance Philip Peters for a handout at his home on 3335 West Moncrieff Place in Denver, Colorado. Coneys broke into the house in Peters' absence to steal food and money. In the ceiling of a closet, Coneys found a small trapdoor that led to a narrow attic cubbyhole and decided to occupy the small space without Peters' knowledge. Coneys lived in the house undiscovered for about five weeks. On October 17, 1941, Peters discovered Coneys at the refrigerator. Peters struck at Coneys with a cane he carried, but Coneys clubbed him with an old pistol he had found in the house. After the gun broke apart, Coneys continued the battery with a heavy iron stove shaker and bludgeoned the 73-year-old Peters to death. Coneys then returned to the attic cubbyhole.

Peters' body was discovered later the same day after a neighbor, concerned Peters had not come by for dinner, called the police. The police found all of the home's doors and windows locked, and there was no other sign of forced entry. They noted the trapdoor but believed a normal-sized person could not fit through it. Peters' wife, who had been in the hospital recuperating from a broken hip during and prior to Coneys' occupation of the attic, returned to live in the house with a housekeeper. Both women would often hear strange sounds in the house. The housekeeper quit after becoming convinced the house was haunted and Mrs. Peters moved to western Colorado to live with her son. Mabel Berke and her five children lived next door to the house and would consistently see lights going on and off, once even arming herself with a baseball bat and knocking on the door.

Coneys remained in the vacant house with the occasional signs of his occupation written off as an apparition or local pranksters. Police continued to make routine checks, when on July 30, 1942, one of them heard a lock click on the second floor. Running upstairs, the police caught the sight of Coneys' legs as he was going through the trapdoor and pulled him down. He was taken into police custody and confessed to the crime.

Local newspapers dubbed him "The Sneaky Sneaky Spider-Man of Denver" after police detective Fred Zarnow remarked "A man would have to be a spider to stand it long up there." Coneys was tried and convicted, then sentenced to life imprisonment at the Colorado State Penitentiary in Cañon City, Colorado.

== Death and legacy ==
Theodore Coneys died on May 16, 1967, at the Colorado State Penitentiary prison hospital. He was interred at Mountain Vale Cemetery in Cañon City.

The case was referenced in Erle Stanley Gardner's 1956 Cool and Lam novel "Beware the Curves".

Two episodes of popular American television shows appear to have been inspired by the Denver Spiderman story, the CSI: Crime Scene Investigation episode "Stalker" and The Simpsons episode "The Ziff Who Came to Dinner".

Cartoonist Noah Van Sciver drew the story of the case for volume 15 of the comics anthology MOME in 2009.
