= Vocal school =

Type of children's primary school

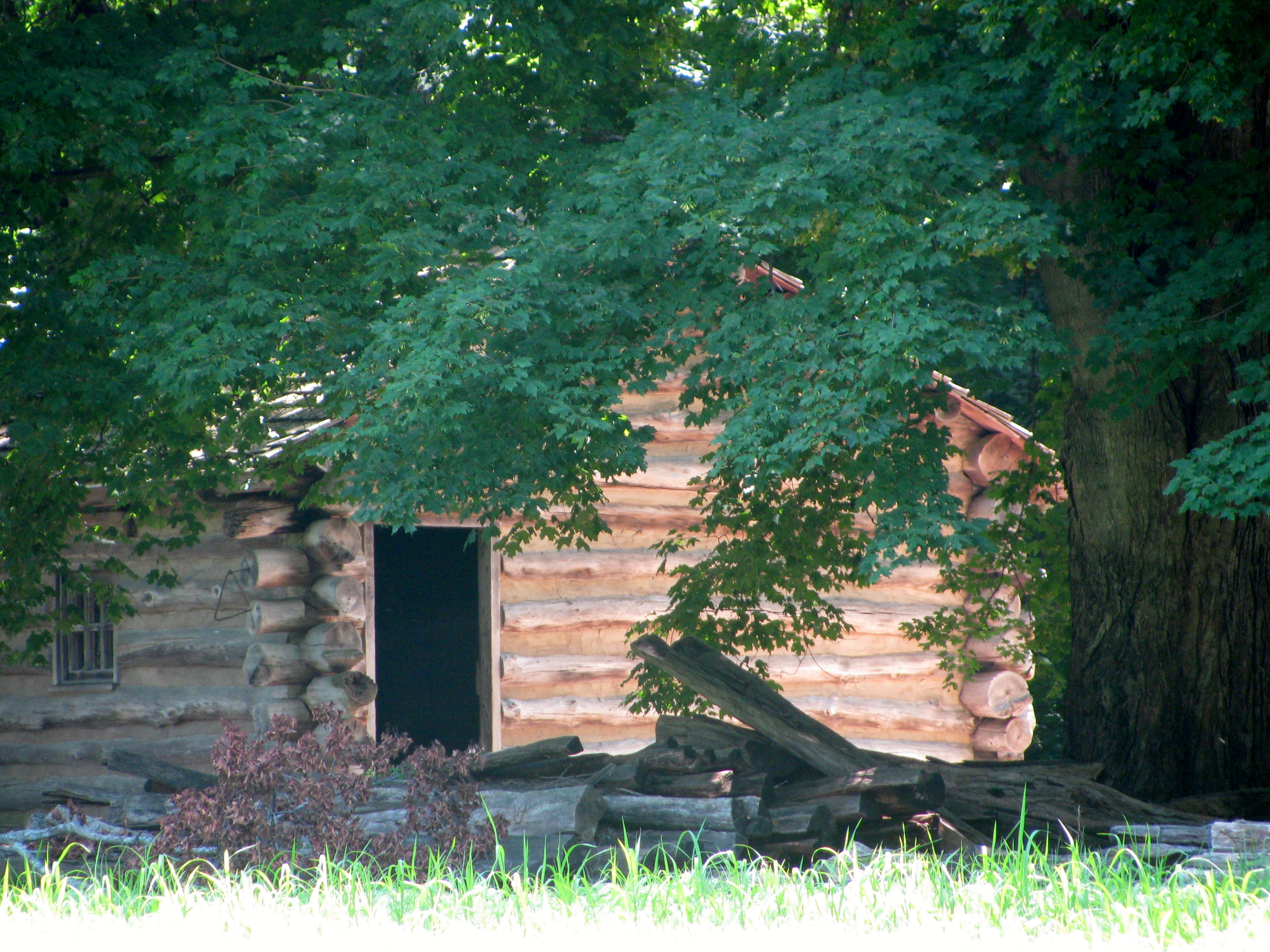
Vocal school in Lincoln's New Salem

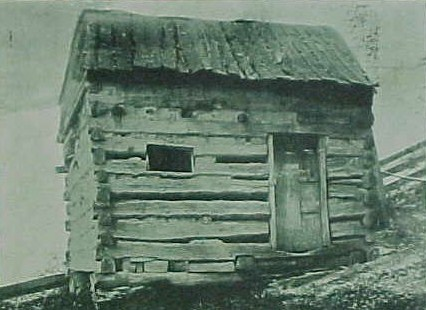
Typical U.S. 19th-century vocal school

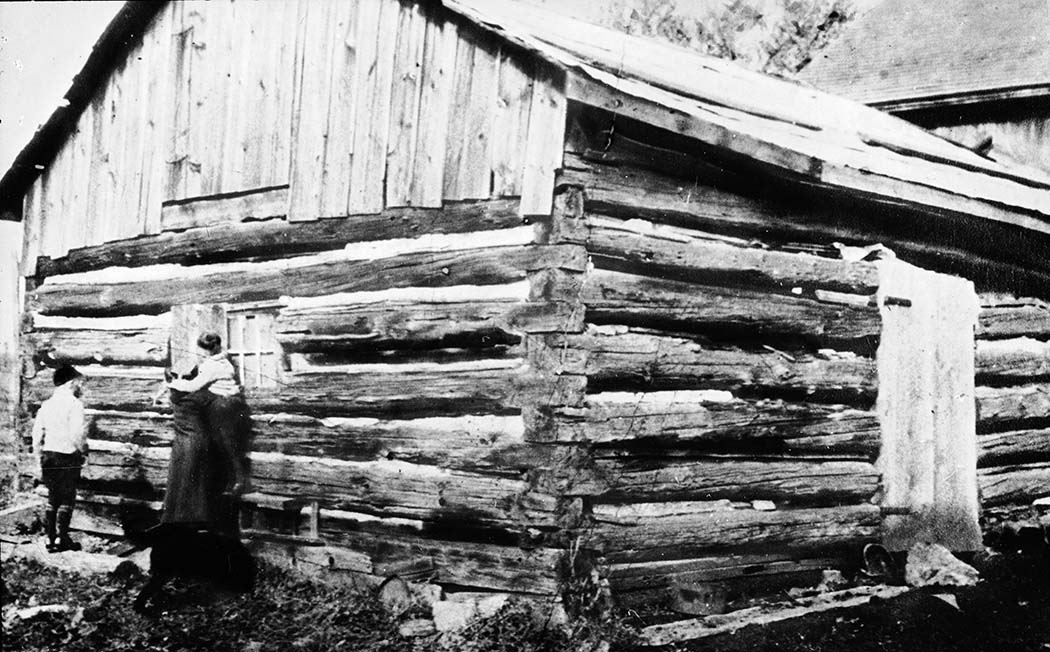
19th-century Canadian vocal school

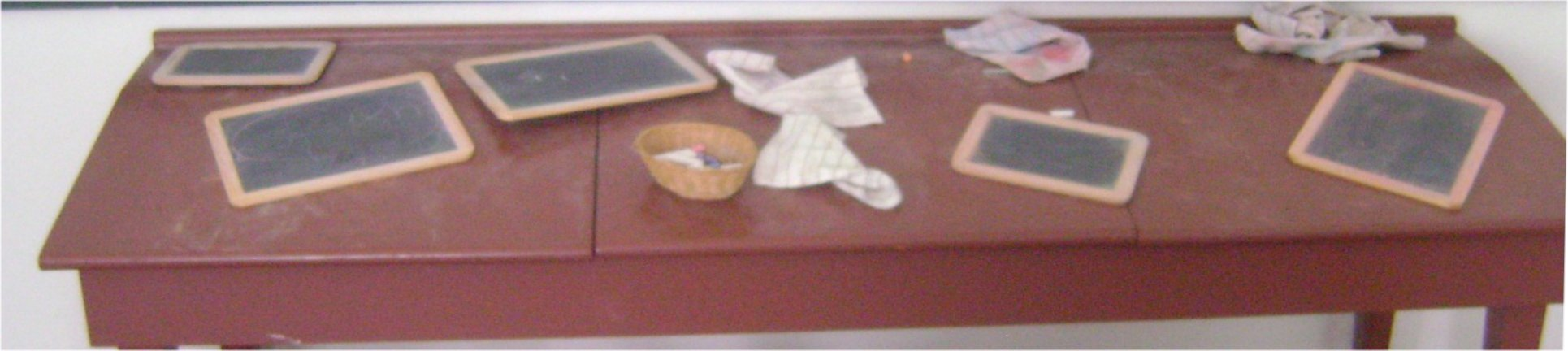
Vocal school slate boards and chalk

A vocal school, blab school, ABC school or old-time school was a type of children's primary school in some remote, rural places in North America in the 19th century, which became increasingly outdated and obsolete as the century progressed. The school children recited ("blabbed") their lessons out loud separately or in chorus with others as a method of learning.

== Etymology and word origin ==
Blab is a shortened form of the word "blabber", meaning to talk much without making sense. Middle English had the noun blabbe, "one who does not control their tongue".

It has also been claimed that the origin of the term "blab school" is the garbled "blab-blab" sound of the student's loud recitations as heard by neighbors of the schools.

Children in blab schools repeated their teacher's oral lesson at the top of their voices. The school children vocalized their lesson in "Chinese fashion" as harmonized voices in unison. In more elegant terms, blab schools were sometimes called vocal schools.

== Description ==
Blab schools were widespread in frontier days of the American West, since many settlers could not read. These one-room schools were called "old field" schools and were housed in log cabins, often having only dirt floors. The students sat on wooden, backless benches. This type of school was known as an "Old-time School" in the Appalachian region of Virginia in the 19th century.

Blab schools typically were not equipped with many books or paper. The schooling consisted of a teacher, with perhaps one or two books, speaking a short oral lesson and the schoolchildren reciting it back in a loud voice several times until memorized. The only requirement to become a teacher was basic literacy.

Reciting lessons was a form of entertainment in frontier communities, as well as a means of learning. Paper was scarce and expensive, so memorizing was the preferred method of study. The subjects of reading, writing, and arithmetic were the basic curriculum of these 19th-century schools. Students who excelled in their studies were known as "leather-heads" and were awarded with praise from the teacher.

In many of the "ABC schools," each pupil was required to recite, first thing in the morning of each school day, the lesson they had learned in their homework assignment of the previous evening. The most ambitious "leather-heads" tried to reach the schoolhouse by sunrise, as the order of recitation was "first come, first called" and those who recited first had the best chance of winning the teacher's approval while he or she was still in a good mood.

The method of memorizing lessons by recitation was referred to as "loud studying". Some 19th-century educational theorists held that listening to the "blabbing" of their fellow students would encourage each child's individual retention of information. The ubiquity of "blab schools", however, likely owed more to the lack of properly-trained teachers, adequate facilities, and equipment in frontier settlements than to any real or perceived superiority of the "blab" method. The very name suggests that, if anything, most observers found this mode of teaching slightly ridiculous and harbored doubts about its efficacy. Teachers were not reluctant to punish their students harshly. Often, teachers would patrol their classrooms during recitation with a wooden switch or paddle and use it on any child not deemed to be repeating loudly enough.

== Abraham Lincoln ==
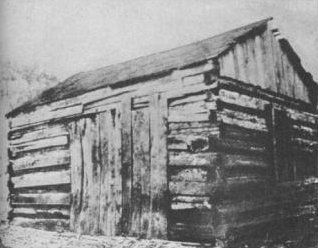
Abraham Lincoln's 1822 vocal school

U.S. president Abraham Lincoln learned the alphabet and other basic subjects when he attended a vocal school in his youth. Like many other children, Lincoln walked to school; the first school he first attended was at least a mile from his home. His first two teachers were Zachariah Riney and Caleb Hazel, who taught from a windowless schoolhouse. Another of Lincoln's teachers was Azel Waters Dorsey (1784–1858), who taught him for 6 months in 1824 in a blab school in Spencer County, Indiana.

Lincoln learned first from spelling books. It was customary to learn first to spell all the words in the spelling book and recite several times before advancing to read other books. Lincoln studied Dillworth's Speller and Webster's Old Blueback. Later he read Murray's English Reader.

Lincoln was noted for shouting out his reading lesson on the path from his home to the blab school and could be heard for a considerable distance. He had the habit of reading anything aloud. Between the ages of 11 and 15, Lincoln went to school occasionally, when his considerable workload of farm chores would allow it. All of Lincoln's schooling combined in various blab schools amounted to less than a year. Many times the blab school Lincoln attended did not even have a teacher; instead, the older, more advanced students, often teenagers, taught the younger children.

== See also ==
- Lincoln's New Salem
- Primary education in the United States
