= Menard County Courthouse (Illinois) =

Local government building in the United States

Coordinates: 40°00′38″N 89°50′56″W

The Menard County Courthouse, located at 102 South 7th Street in Petersburg, Illinois, is the county courthouse serving Menard County, Illinois. Built in 1896-1897, it is a building of Beaux Arts architecture. The cost of construction was $44,000.

== Description ==
The Menard County Courthouse holds court sessions on cases brought to it within its 8th Circuit jurisdiction. It is also the meeting place of the elected county board, and contains offices for the county. The 1896-1897 Menard County Courthouse is the second building to serve this purpose. The first courthouse was built in 1843-1844 by a crew headed by Henry Dresser.
