= Mary Hays Weik =

American writer

Mary Hays Weik (1898–1979) was an American children's book author and activist for world government.

Weik was born on December 18, 1898, in Greencastle, Indiana, daughter of the biographer Jesse W. Weik. She was the author of The Jazz Man, which received a Newbery Honor in 1967. Her daughter was the author and illustrator Ann Grifalconi.

She wrote booklets for the American Federation of World Citizens and the Committee to End Radiological Hazards.

Weik died on December 25, 1979, in Manhattan, New York. Her papers are held at the University of Michigan.

== Works ==
- Adventure: A Book of Verse, 1919
- The House at Cherry Hill, 1938
- A World Set Free, 1954
- Shadow over America, 1962
- The Jazz Man, 1966
- The Scarlet Thread: A Group of One Act Plays for Young People, 1968
- A House on Liberty Street, 1973
