= Jesse W. Weik =

American writer (1857–1930)

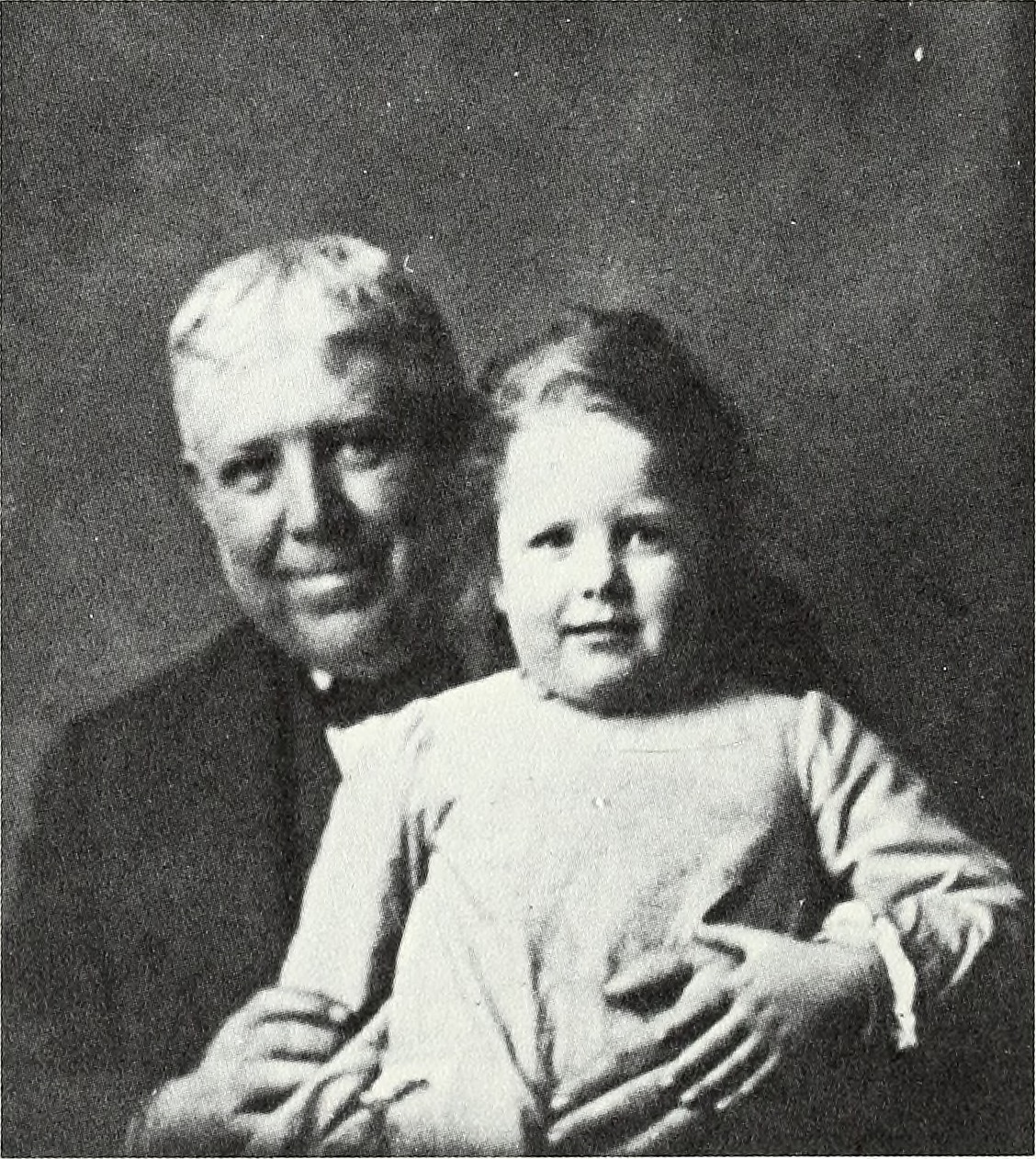
- Born: August 23, 1857; Greencastle, Indiana
- Died: August 18, 1930 (aged 72)

Jesse William Weik (25 November 1857 – August 18, 1930), was a collaborator with William Herndon in writing the first authoritative biography of Abraham Lincoln, published in 1889.

== Biography ==
Weik was born in Greencastle, Indiana. His father emigrated from Germany to the United States in 1848; his mother was a native of Cincinnati. His education, begun in the public schools of Greencastle, was completed at Indiana Asbury College (now DePauw University), in Greencastle, where he received an A.B. in 1875 and a Master of Arts in 1883. He was admitted to the bar in 1880, but never practiced.

In 1882 he received an appointment as special examiner of the U.S. Pension Bureau, and was detailed to examine the merits of certain pension claims in the neighborhood of Springfield, Illinois. While in the latter locality he began to familiarize himself with the life and history of Abraham Lincoln. He interviewed carefully and in detail all persons there and elsewhere who had been associated with or had known Lincoln in his lifetime. He also visited that section of Kentucky in which Lincoln was born, giving special attention to the questions of his birth and descent, and traveled through southern Indiana amid the scenes of Lincoln's boyhood.

His daughter was the children's writer and world government activist Mary Hays Weik, the mother of the author and illustrator Ann Grifalconi.

== Writings ==
Between 1885 and 1888, he combined his research material with primary research material compiled by Lincoln's former law partner William Herndon, as well as several hundred pages of letters and essays written by Herndon himself setting out his own personal reminiscences of Lincoln, and forged the material into the first authoritative biography of Lincoln, which was published in 1889 under the title, Herndon's Lincoln: The True Story of a Great Life (Chicago: Belford, Clarke. 3 vols.), listing Herndon and Weik as coauthors.

In 1892, Weik published a revised version of the book (Herndon had died in 1891) titled, Abraham Lincoln: The True Story of a Great Life (New York: D. Appleton. 2 vols.). In 1922 he published The Real Lincoln: A Portrait.

Weik was also a frequent contributor to newspapers, his articles being devoted to certain phases of Lincoln's career and other contemporary historical subjects.

=== Works ===
The various works by Weik are in the public domain and are available on line.

- Abraham Lincoln and the battles of the Civil War. New York, The Century Co. 1887.
- Herndon, William Henry; Weik, Jesse William; White, Horace (1920). Abraham Lincoln : the true story of a great life, Vol I. New York; London : D. Appleton and Co.
- Herndon, William Henry; Weik, Jesse William; White, Horace (1920). Abraham Lincoln : the true story of a great life, Vol II. New York; London : D. Appleton and Co.
