= Petersburg, Illinois =

- City
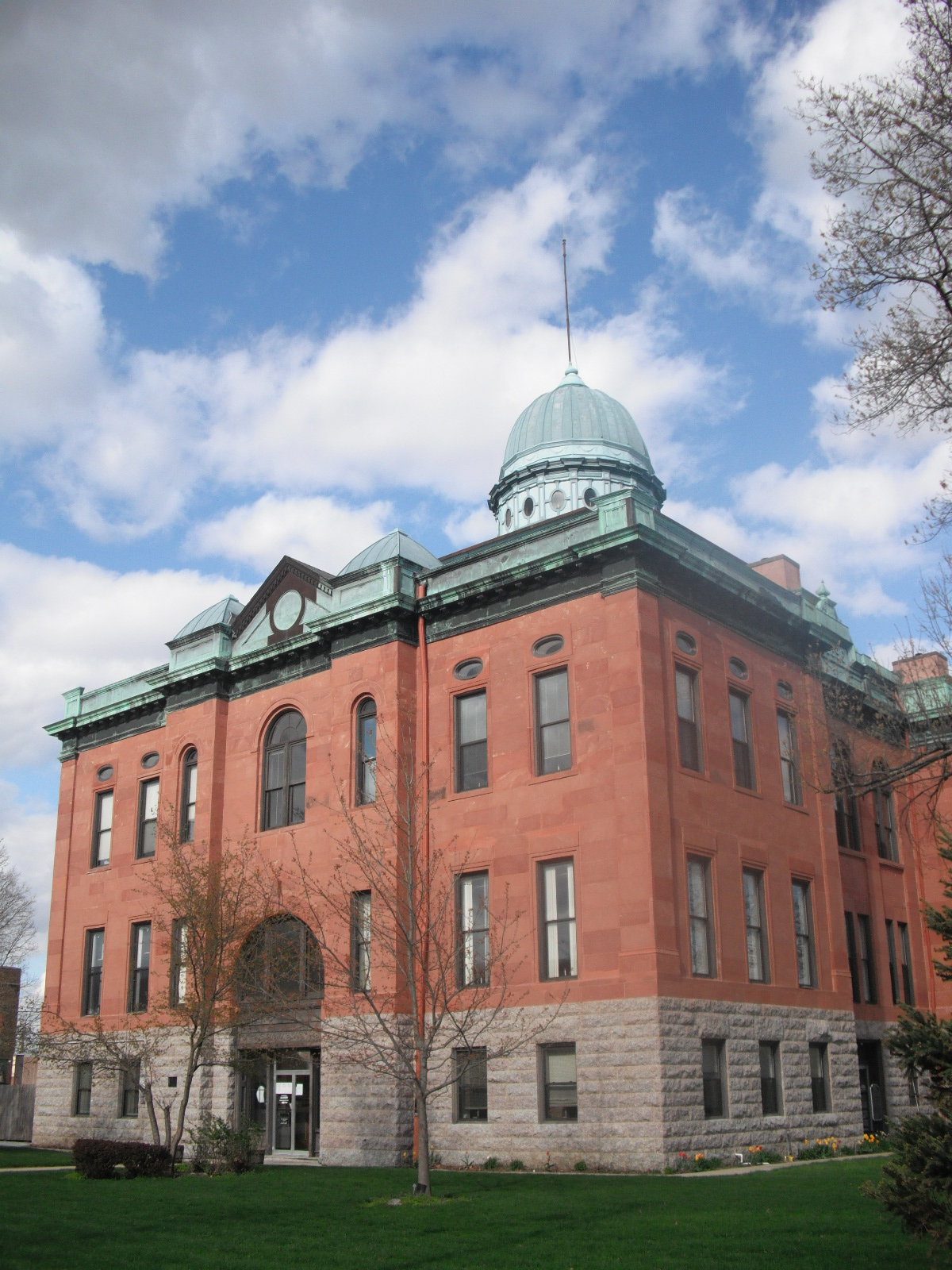
- Menard County Courthouse
- Interactive map of Petersburg, Illinois
- Location within Illinois Location within the United States
- Coordinates: 40°00′51″N 89°50′43″W
- Country: United States
- State: Illinois
- County: Menard
- Founded: 1833

Area
  - Total: 1.56 sq mi (4.05 km^{2})
  - Land: 1.56 sq mi (4.05 km^{2})
  - Water: 0 sq mi (0.00 km^{2})
- Elevation: 499 ft (152 m)

Population (2020)
  - Total: 2,258
  - Density: 1,445.4/sq mi (558.08/km^{2})
- Time zone: UTC−6 (CST)
  - Summer (DST): UTC−5 (CDT)
- ZIP code: 62675
- Area code: 217
- FIPS code: 17-59312
- GNIS feature ID: 2396193
- Website: www.petersburgil.org

Petersburg is a city in and the county seat of Menard County, Illinois, United States, on the bluffs and part of the floodplain overlooking the Sangamon River. It is part of the Springfield, Illinois metropolitan area. The population was 2,258 at the 2020 census, nearly unchanged from 2010. Petersburg is located approximately 2 miles (3 km) north of New Salem, the original location where Abraham Lincoln first settled, as he started his career.

== History ==
The town began as a planned community organized by real estate speculators Peter Lukins (for whom the town is named) and George Warburton. Abraham Lincoln worked as the surveyor who first mapped, measured and help to divide lots on the land. Petersburg quickly grew, due to an advantageous placement on the river, becoming the county seat in the 1830s and eventually drawing off the population of New Salem, which was abandoned in 1840.

Many of the Victorian-era homes built by early wealthy inhabitants still stand on the bluffs of Petersburg. The town itself takes pride in these structures, which has even preserved some of the original cobblestone streets to complement the classical architecture.

== Geography ==
Petersburg is located in central Menard County and Illinois Route 97 passes through the city on Sixth Street, leading northwest 25 miles (40 km) to Havana and southeast 23 miles (37 km) to Springfield, the state capital. Illinois Route 123 enters Petersburg from the south with IL 97 but leaves to the east on East Sangamon Street. IL 123 leads east and south 11 miles (18 km) to Athens, and southwest 14 miles (23 km) to Illinois Route 125 near Pleasant Plains.

According to the U.S. Census Bureau, Petersburg has a total area of 1.56 square miles (4.04 km^{2}), all land.

The bulk of Petersburg lies on the bluffs overlooking the Sangamon River, though a portion of it, including the downtown/courthouse square area, is technically on the floodplain of the river. The Sangamon flows north, then west to the Illinois River at Beardstown. In recent decades, the depth of the Sangamon River at Petersburg has become too shallow for navigation due to silting from local farming, and the diverting of natural runoff into artificial reservoirs, such as Lake Petersburg and Lake Springfield.

The town itself is moderately forested, a stark contrast to the flat plains around it. The trees are mostly deciduous maples and oaks, and New Salem State Park is home to a sizable stand of old-growth forest.

=== Points of interest ===
- The Edgar Lee Masters Home is located on the corner of Eighth and Jackson streets in Petersburg. Open from 10:00 a.m. to noon and 1:00 to 3:00 p.m. Tuesday through Saturday, Memorial Day through Labor Day.
- Lincoln's New Salem State Historic Site: This park, with its log cabin village, is situated 2 miles (3 km) south of Petersburg. This is where Abraham Lincoln lived from 1831 to 1837. Along with the rebuilt cabins, the park also boasts a historical center and an outdoor theater. It now has more than one-half million visitors each year.
- Starhill Forest Arboretum is 7 miles (11 km) southeast of Petersburg.

=== Natural disasters ===
Petersburg was damaged by an earthquake originating in the New Madrid Fault on July 18, 1909. The earthquake was felt over most of central Illinois, but Petersburg suffered the most widespread damage.

The portions of Petersburg located below the bluffs suffered major flood damage during the intense flood season of 1993. The city and Menard County have since undertaken a campaign to buy and eliminate the low-income housing located in the most flood-prone areas, creating a small series of parks near the Sangamon River.

Shortly after 12:30pm on December 31, 2010, an estimated 40 homes were damaged by a tornado, with 22 of the homes listed as uninhabitable by local officials. The tornado was caused by springlike weather during which the temperature was in the 60s across central Illinois.

== Demographics ==
Historical population
Census	Pop.	Note	%±
1850	714		—
1860	1,196		67.5%
1870	1,792		49.8%
1880	2,332		30.1%
1890	2,842		21.9%
1900	2,807		−1.2%
1910	2,587		−7.8%
1920	2,432		−6.0%
1930	2,319		−4.6%
1940	2,586		11.5%
1950	2,325		−10.1%
1960	2,359		1.5%
1970	2,632		11.6%
1980	2,419		−8.1%
1990	2,261		−6.5%
2000	2,299		1.7%
2010	2,260		−1.7%
2020	2,258		−0.1%
U.S. Decennial Census

=== 2020 census ===
As of the 2020 census, Petersburg had a population of 2,258. The median age was 38.6 years. 25.6% of residents were under the age of 18 and 18.1% of residents were 65 years of age or older. For every 100 females there were 89.1 males, and for every 100 females age 18 and over there were 82.6 males age 18 and over.

0.0% of residents lived in urban areas, while 100.0% lived in rural areas.

There were 992 households in Petersburg, of which 33.5% had children under the age of 18 living in them. Of all households, 39.2% were married-couple households, 17.3% were households with a male householder and no spouse or partner present, and 34.9% were households with a female householder and no spouse or partner present. About 33.5% of all households were made up of individuals and 16.5% had someone living alone who was 65 years of age or older.

There were 1,102 housing units, of which 10.0% were vacant. The homeowner vacancy rate was 2.7% and the rental vacancy rate was 5.9%.

Racial composition as of the 2020 census
Race	Number	Percent
White	2,070	91.7%
Black or African American	23	1.0%
American Indian and Alaska Native	3	0.1%
Asian	21	0.9%
Native Hawaiian and Other Pacific Islander	0	0.0%
Some other race	13	0.6%
Two or more races	128	5.7%
Hispanic or Latino (of any race)	50	2.2%

=== 2000 census ===
As of the census of 2000, there were 2,299 people, 997 households, and 612 families residing in the city. The population density was 1,705.7 inhabitants per square mile (658.6/km^{2}). There were 1,076 housing units at an average density of 798.3 per square mile (308.2/km^{2}). The racial makeup of the city was 97.78% White, 1.09% African American, 0.39% Native American, 0.22% Asian, 0.35% from other races, and 0.17% from two or more races. Hispanic or Latino of any race were 0.78% of the population.

There were 997 households, out of which 31.6% had children under the age of 18 living with them, 44.8% were married couples living together, 13.7% had a female householder with no husband present, and 38.6% were non-families. 35.7% of all households were made up of individuals, and 18.0% had someone living alone who was 65 years of age or older. The average household size was 2.23 and the average family size was 2.89.

In the city the population was spread out, with 24.5% under the age of 18, 8.2% from 18 to 24, 27.4% from 25 to 44, 20.7% from 45 to 64, and 19.2% who were 65 years of age or older. The median age was 38 years. For every 100 females, there were 83.3 males. For every 100 females age 18 and over, there were 79.0 males.

The median income for a household in the city was $34,688, and the median income for a family was $42,500. Males had a median income of $32,292 versus $22,396 for females. The per capita income for the city was $18,718. About 13.8% of families and 16.0% of the population were below the poverty line, including 26.6% of those under age 18 and 6.9% of those age 65 or over.

== Economy ==
The economy of the area is primarily based on agriculture, particularly corn production. Tourism is a steady (if small) industry, and the town caters to Lincoln enthusiasts as a gateway to New Salem and in housing some relics of Lincoln's early life in Illinois. There are also a growing number of bed and breakfast inns, many of which are located in restored Victorian homes. Recent developments have also turned the town into a bedroom community for the state capital of Springfield, Illinois, which is 23 miles (37 km) to the southeast.

== Media ==
Petersburg is served by WCIA, WICS, WAND, WSEC, WRSP television stations. Petersburg is also served by The State Journal-Register newspaper in Springfield and The Petersburg Observer.

== Notable people ==
- Theodore Edward Coneys, convicted of murder in Denver, Colorado
- William Taylor Davidson, newspaper editor; born in Petersburg
- Bill Krieg, utility player for various teams; born in Petersburg
- Harris Laning, admiral, United States Navy; born in Petersburg
- Edgar Lee Masters, lawyer and author (Spoon River Anthology)
- William B. McKinley, United States senator from Illinois
- Ann Rutledge, allegedly Abraham Lincoln's first love
