= William Herndon (lawyer) =

American lawyer and politician (1818–1891)

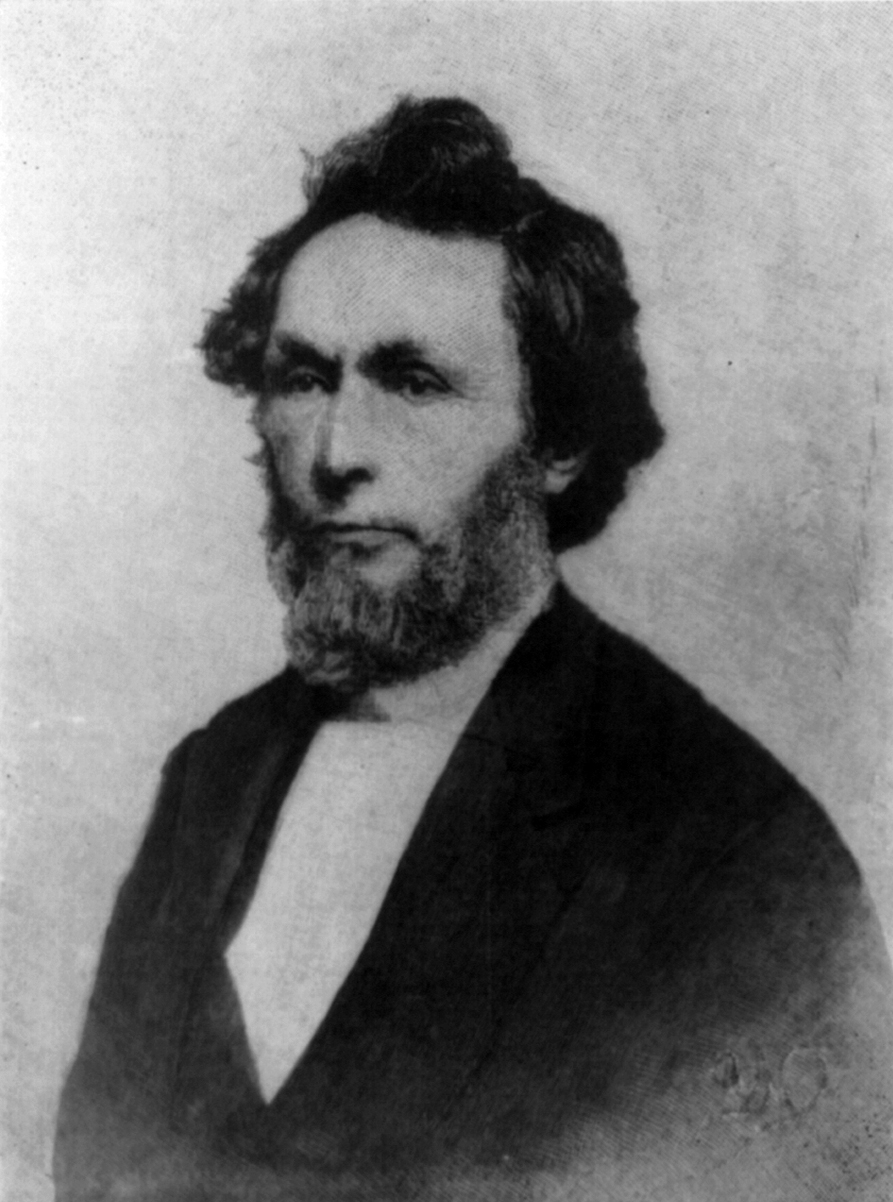
- Herndon ca. 1875
- Born: William Henry Herndon; December 25, 1818; Greensburg, Kentucky, U.S.
- Died: March 18, 1891 (aged 72); Springfield, Illinois, U.S.
- Education: Illinois College
- Occupations: Lawyer, biographer
- Known for: Partner and biographer of Abraham Lincoln
- Political party: Republican

William Henry Herndon (December 25, 1818 – March 18, 1891) was an American lawyer and politician who was a law partner and biographer of President Abraham Lincoln. He was an early member of the new Republican Party and was elected mayor of Springfield, Illinois.

Herndon and Jesse W. Weik wrote the book Herndon's Lincoln: The True Story of a Great Life, published in 1889.

== Early life ==
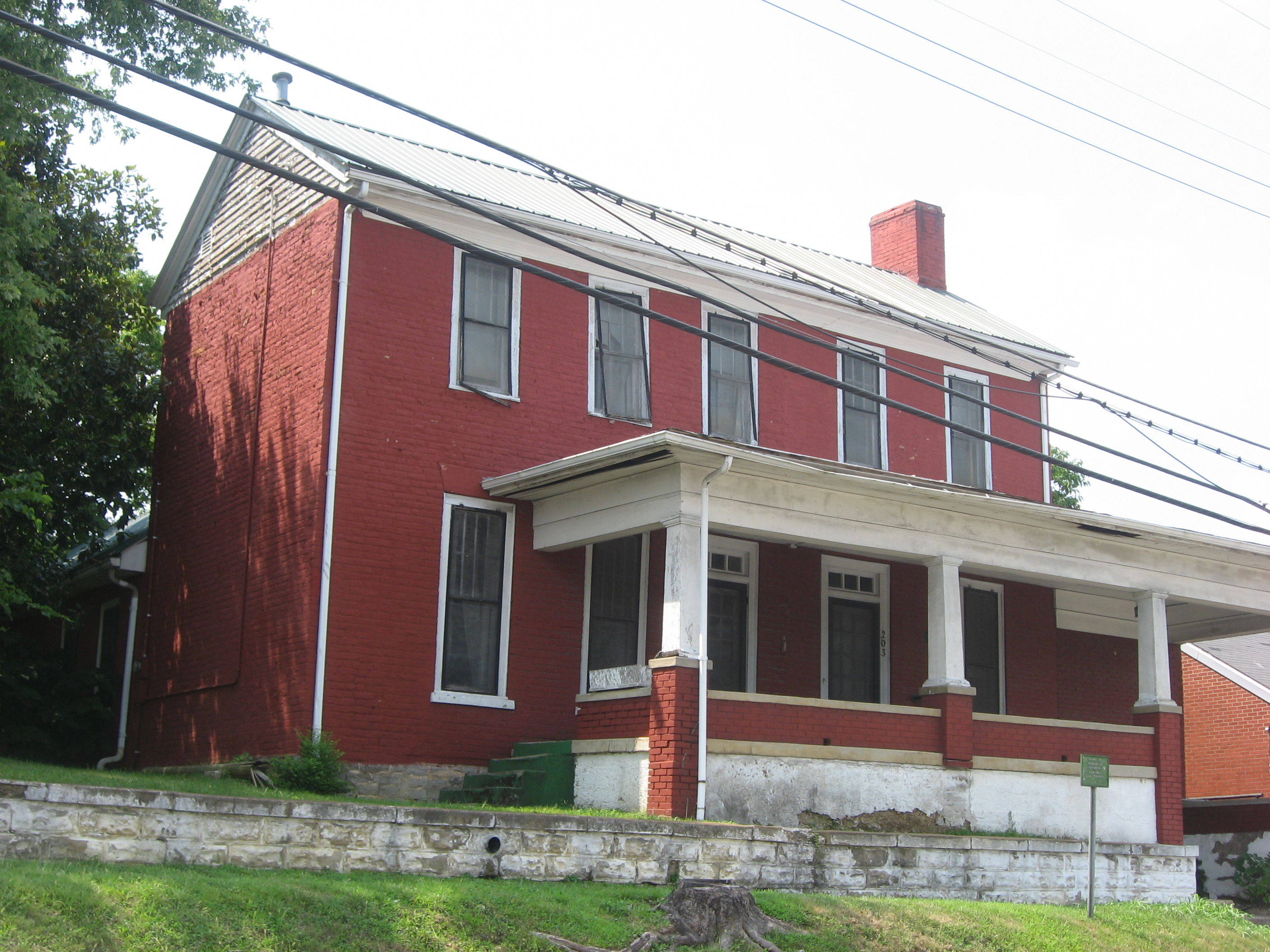
Herndon's birthplace in Greensburg

Herndon was born the first child of Archer G. Herndon and his wife Rebecca (Day) Johnson, on December 25, 1818, in Greensburg, Kentucky. The family of three moved to Illinois in 1820 and lived for a year in Madison County, Illinois, where Archer and Rebecca had another child.

By the spring of 1821, the family was living in Sangamon County. When William was five, the family settled in the German Prairie settlement located five miles northeast of Springfield. Two more children were born to the family there.

Herndon's father built the first tavern in Springfield and was engaged in other forms of mercantile business from 1825 to 1836. He was also involved in politics as state senator, and was one of the men instrumental in having the state capital moved to Springfield.

William, known as "Billy", worked for his father at the Indian Queen hotel before he attended college. It was one of the first hotels in Springfield.

== Marriage and children ==
On March 26, 1840, Herndon married Mary J. Maxcy in Sangamon County. Mary's family were also early Illinois settlers; her grandfather and step-grandmother arrived in 1827 and Mary's immediate family arrived in 1834. Mary was born in Kentucky on July 27, 1822, to Maria Cook Maxcy and James Maxcy, a veteran of the War of 1812. James' father, Revolutionary War veteran Joel Maxcy, arrived in Sangamon County in 1827 with his second wife and died the following month.

Mary and William had six children: James, Annie, Beverly, Elizabeth, Leigh and Mary. Mary Herndon died on August 18, 1860. The following summer, on July 31, 1861, Herndon married Anna Miles with whom he had three more children: Nina Belle, William and Minnie. The family moved to a farm in Fancy Creek Township located six miles north of Springfield. (Note: Biographical notes for Herndon in the Herndon-Weik collection of Lincolniana at The Library of Congress records that Mary Maxcy died in 1861 and Herndon married Anna Miles in 1862.)

== Education and career ==
Herndon attended Illinois College from 1836 to 1837 in Jacksonville, Illinois, but he had "an unsuccessful year". Following this, he returned to Springfield and clerked at Joshua Speed's store, where he often engaged in debates, discussions, and poetry readings with Abraham Lincoln. Their conversations and readings were sometimes practice sessions before presenting material to the Young Men's Lyceum, where both Herndon and Lincoln were members. It was an organization of aspiring young men.

In 1840, Herndon began studying law at the Logan and Lincoln law practice. Although employed at Joshua Speed's store, he studied up to 14 hours per day after work.

In November 1844, Herndon passed the bar examination. In 1854, ten years after beginning his partnership with Lincoln, he was elected mayor of Springfield, Illinois. Both Herndon and Lincoln were members of the Whig Party. In 1856, Herndon was one of the organizers of the fledgling Republican Party after the dissolution of the Whigs. Lincoln also joined the Republican Party, hoping to "fuse" people of disparate political affiliations who wanted to end slavery.

Herndon loved to learn and developed "one of the best private libraries in Springfield" including works by historians, economists, humanists, free-thinkers, and philosophers.

== Abraham Lincoln ==
=== Partnership ===
In the fall of 1844, Lincoln was tired of being a junior partner in his law firm. He had worked for senior partners with political ambitions, and Lincoln wanted a younger partner to whom he could relate. Surprising both his wife and Herndon, Lincoln invited his friend Herndon to form a partnership. Lincoln appreciated Herndon's friendship, loyalty, shared political beliefs, and conscientious study. Lincoln said that Herndon "was my man always above all other men on the globe." Herndon did not disappoint his friend. He contributed to the practice by performing research for his older and more experienced partner, building the firm's law library, and overseeing young men who came to study law (read the law) at their office.

=== Politics ===
Herndon was a much stauncher opponent of slavery than Lincoln and he claimed that he helped change Lincoln's views on the subject. He felt that President Lincoln acted too slowly to bring an end to slavery. Herndon felt that the only way to rid the country of slavery was "through bloody revolution."

During political campaigns, Herndon made strong points that tended to alienate members of the Republican Party and swing voters. Thus, for the 1860 presidential campaign, Herndon was not involved in direct political activities. However, he executed an important task during that campaign by conducting opposition research in the Illinois State Library to be used against Stephen A. Douglas in the 1860 presidential race. Another interesting point, when Lincoln balked at voting for himself, Herndon persuaded him to do so.

=== Relationship with the Lincoln family ===
Through the length of his partnership and friendship with Lincoln, he was never invited to Lincoln's home for dinner due to his contentious relationship with Lincoln's wife, Mary Todd Lincoln. Herndon also admitted that he was frustrated with Lincoln's overly permissive parenting of his two younger sons, Willie and Tad, whom he recalled as being undisciplined and disruptive brats in the law office. It was this type of opinion that caused some harsh words during their partnership.

His final meeting with Lincoln occurred in 1862 when he visited Washington, D.C. Lincoln received him amicably, but he was not invited into the family's private quarters in the White House due to the enmity that had build up between him and Mary Lincoln.

=== Biography ===
==== Initial research ====
Following Lincoln's assassination, Herndon began to collect stories of Lincoln's life from those who knew him. Herndon aspired to write a truthful portrait of his friend and law partner, based on his own observations and on hundreds of letters and interviews he had compiled for that purpose. He was determined to present Lincoln as a man, rather than a saint, and to reveal things that the prevailing Victorian era conventions said should be left out of the biography of a great national hero. (Note: Herndon's research techniques of seeking out first hand interviews and information seem unremarkable today but were almost unheard of by 19th century biographical standard. The raw material for Herndon's biography of Lincoln included correspondence, interviews, recollections, notes, newspaper clippings and other material.)

In particular, Herndon said of Lincoln's "official" biographers, John Nicolay and John Hay: "They are aiming, first, to do a superb piece of literary work; second, to make the story with the classes as against the masses." Herndon felt that this book would represent the "real Lincoln about as well as does a wax figure in the museum."

==== Shared research information ====
Ward Hill Lamon, who was then collaborating with a ghostwriter on a Lincoln biography, approached Herndon for assistance. Herndon provided copies of and access to his original correspondences with Lincoln acquaintances and a written agreement not to publish his own biography of Lincoln for at least ten years in exchange for $2,000 cash and an agreement to receive up to $2,000 of the book's royalties.

==== Collaboration with Jesse Weik ====
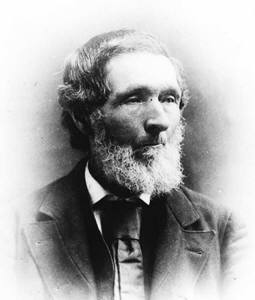
An older William Herndon.

A young man named Jesse W. Weik, who had corresponded with Herndon, also became a good friend. They decided to collaborate on a biography of Lincoln's life. Weik performed additional research in the 1880s, picking up any new information since Herndon's original research, and rewrote much of Herndon's draft.

Herndon's Lincoln: The True Story of a Great Life, the result of their collaborations, appeared in a three-volume edition published by Belford, Clarke & Company in 1889. The majority of the actual writing was done by Weik, who received full credit as co-author.

The book received mixed reviews due to the inclusion of such straightforward aspects as Lincoln's mother's illegitimacy (and even the rumors of Lincoln's own), its sometimes cruel portrayal of Herndon's longtime enemy Mary Todd Lincoln, Abraham Lincoln's suicidal depression, and other decidedly less-than-flattering accounts of the martyred president who was quickly becoming the most venerated and romanticized figure in American history.

"One thing that students of Abraham Lincoln are universally agreed on is that there was an antagonism between his wife, Mary Todd Lincoln, and his law partner, William H. Herndon. How can it be doubted, when Herndon referred to her with such epithets as "she wolf" and "the female wild cat of the age" and she angrily denounced him as "a dirty dog"?

Weik kept the notes gathered during the writing of the book and wrote a follow-up book The Real Lincoln: A Portrait, which included Weik's personal insights and some embarrassing details regarding Herndon.

==== Reception ====
Particularly damning was the denunciation of the book by Robert Todd Lincoln, whose grudge against Herndon stemmed largely from Herndon's recounting of Ann Rutledge as the only romantic love of his father's life. Weik felt that Herndon's portrayal of Mary Todd Lincoln and the Lincoln's domestic life was especially hurtful.

== Death ==
Herndon died March 18, 1891, at his farm in Fancy Creek Township, Sangamon County, Illinois north of Springfield. He is buried in Oak Ridge Cemetery in Springfield, the same cemetery as the Lincoln Tomb.

Herndon's son William, or Willie, died the same day as his father. Herndon died of la grippe (influenza) and his son Willie had (la grippe that turned into) pneumonia. Herndon's wife Anna died less than two years later on January 7, 1893.

== Portrayal ==
Herndon was portrayed in many films for decades, including:

- Jason Robards, Sr. in the 1930 film Abraham Lincoln
- Alan Baxter in the 1940 biographical film Abe Lincoln in Illinois
- Jeffrey DeMunn in the 1988 (TV mini-series) Lincoln
- Keith Carradine in the 1992 movie Lincoln
- Michael Maize in the 2013 film Saving Lincoln
- Bob Gunton in the 2017 film The Gettysburg Address

== See also ==
- Abraham Lincoln's patent

== Bibliography ==
- Donald, David Herbert (1948). Lincoln's Herndon. Alfred A. Knopf. p. 253. online
- Donald, David Herbert (2011). We Are Lincoln Men: Abraham Lincoln and His Friends. Simon & Schuster. pp. 67–68. ISBN 978-0743254700.
- Emerson, Jason (2012). Giant in the Shadows: The Life of Robert T. Lincoln. SIU Press. ISBN 978-0809390717.
- Mansch, Larry D. (2007). Abraham Lincoln, President-Elect: The Four Critical Months from Election to Inauguration. McFarland. p. 41. ISBN 978-0786431021.
