= Ann Grifalconi =

American illustrator and writer (1929–2020)

Ann Grifalconi (September 22, 1929 – February 19, 2020) was an American author and illustrator of children's books.

== Biography ==
Born in New York, she studied art at the Cooper Union School of Art, where she received a certificate in advertising art in 1950, and art history at New York University, where she earned her BA. She worked for several years in advertising and display, then taught art and design at the High School of Fashion Industries before leaving to become a full-time illustrator and author.

Grifalconi is the author of several books for children, including The Village of Round and Square Houses (a runner-up for the 1987 Caldecott Medal for illustration, her work) and Ain't Nobody a Stranger to Me (illustrated by Jerry Pinkney). As an illustrator she has worked with authors including Elizabeth Bishop, Lucille Clifton, Walter Dean Myers, and Tillie S. Pine. She shared a Coretta Scott King Award with Clifton for Everrett Anderson's Goodbye; The Jazz Man, which she illustrated for Mary Hays Weik, was a 1967 Newbery Honor book and an ALA Notable book.

Though Grifalconi is better known as an author and illustrator, other work demonstrates feminist service within historically male-dominated institutions including publishing and finance. She was the president of publishing company Greyfalcon House, Inc, which published "Oreo" by Fran Ross in 1974. Ross's only published work, "Oreo" remained obscure until discovery and republication in the 2000s and has since been described as "ahead of its time," "one of the masterpieces of 20th century American comic writing," and a "feminist odyssey." Johnson, Mat (9 March 2011). Ann Grifalconi was a founder and board member of the New York Feminist Credit Union (1973-1980) which staff there described as "helping women establish credit, especially divorced, separated or widowed women who were not able to establish credit in their own names when married." Grifalconi's re-illustration of Michelangelo's Creation of Adam fresco (featuring women instead of men) also adorned the cover of special issue of a 1975 Quaker journal entitled "Feminism and Spirituality."

Grifalconi lived in New York City and died on February 19, 2020, at The New Jewish Home in the same city.
