= List of demolished churches in New York City =

== 17th century ==
=== 1630s construction ===
- First Dutch Reformed Church (New Amsterdam) (1633), Pearl Street in New Amsterdam—Congregation was organized in the 1620s. It was a simple timber structure with a gambrel roof and no spire. It was replaced ten years later.

=== 1640s construction ===
- Second Dutch Reformed Church (New Amsterdam) (c.1643) -- The second church was located within Fort Amsterdam's walls. The stone church had a spire with a weathercock, and was the tallest structure in the city. After the fall of New Amsterdam to the British, the structure was reused as a military garrison church for the Episcopal faith.

=== 1690s construction ===
- Garden Street Church (1693), Garden Street—Located on (what is now) Exchange Place, it was built to replace the garrison church / second (c.1643) after its appropriation by the British. The congregation was granted a full charter as the Dutch Church in America by King William III of England on May 19, 1696.
- Trinity Church (1698), Wall Street—Founded in 1696 when Governor Benjamin Fletcher approved the purchase of land in Lower Manhattan by the Church of England community for construction of a new church, and chartered 1697 by King William III of England The next year a modest rectangular church with a gambrel roof and small porch was constructed. A steeple was reported in the early 18th century where Trinity School, a charity school, were held. The church was destroyed during the American Revolutionary War in the Great New York City Fire of 1776, which destroyed nearly 500 buildings.

== 18th century ==
=== 1710s construction ===
- St. Andrew's Church (c.1712), Arthur Kill Road—Built around 1712–1713, the church was damaged in fires in 1867 and 1872, when the structure was rebuilt.

=== 1720s construction ===
- Middle Collegiate Church (1729), Nassau Street near Cedar—Built in 1729, "a North Church was added in 1769, to serve a growing congregation." The church "later became the Post Office, and was demolished in 1882."

=== 1740s construction ===
- The Old Brick Church (1767), predecessor congregation of Brick Presbyterian Church, located on the northeast corner of Beekman and Nassau Streets – A five-bay double-height Federalist-styled Presbyterian church, built 1767 to designs by John McComb Sr. It was rectangular in plan with a projecting square-in-plan four-stage tower (final stage setback) with a three-stage round colonnaded spire extension. It was illustrated in 1856 for Frank Leslie’s Illustrated, who reported that the land was “probably the most valuable in the city.” The city planned to put a post office on the site that year but the deal fell through and “the congregation managed to sell the property to the New York Times which put up a building on the site in 1857-1858.”

=== 1760s construction ===
- North Church (1769) -- Built to serve a growing congregation of Middle Collegiate Church (built 1729).
- First Reformed Dutch Church of Richmondtown (c.1769), located on Arthur Kill Road near the first county courthouse in Historic Richmondtown, Staten Island. The church, along with the first courthouse, was burned down by the British during the American Revolution.

=== 1780s construction ===
- Trinity Church (1788–1790), Wall Street—Building began in 1788, it was consecrated in 1790, and torn down after being weakened by severe snows during the winter of 1838–39. The present (third) Trinity Church, completed in 1846 to designs by Richard Upjohn, with its 281-foot (86 m) spire and cross was the highest point in New York until being surpassed in 1890 by the New York World Building.

== 19th century ==
=== 1800s construction ===
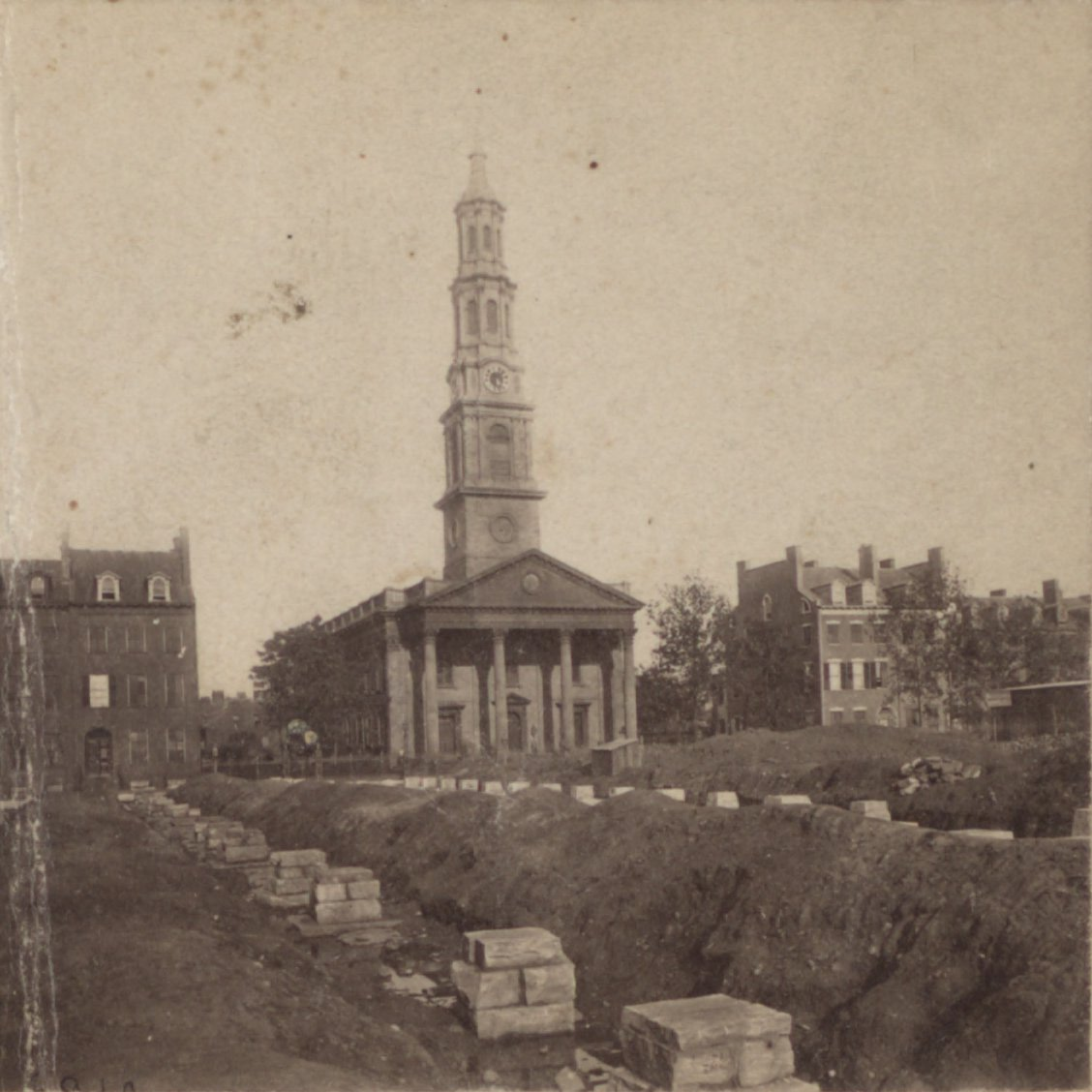
St. John's Episcopal c. 1867

- St. John's Chapel (1803) – A chapel in the Episcopal parish of Trinity Church (New York City). It was built in 1803 to a design by John McComb Jr. and his brother Isaac McComb on Varick Street with a sandstone tetra-style prostyle portico supporting a tower (with spire) rising to 214.25 feet. The chancel was added in 1857 to designs by Richard M. Upjohn. The congregation had left in the 1890s and the structure was torn down in 1918. It was cleared during a road-widening scheme for New York City's Varick Street, with city officials fighting to allow the portico to protrude into the widened street and vault the flanking pedestrian sidewalk.
- Second Reformed Dutch Church of Richmondtown (1808), located on Arthur Kill Road on the site of the first church (burned during the American Revolution) and near the second county courthouse (burned in the 1930s) in Historic Richmondtown, Staten Island. The church was moved in 1888 and demolished in 1903.

=== 1810s construction ===
- The Quaker Meeting-house (1818), Hester and Elizabeth Streets, Manhattan, New York – Built 1818 and recorded in 1876 by the New York Express that it “has for a long time been the office of the New York Gas Light Company.” It was presumed demolished.
- The (First) Free African Church of St. Philip (1819), Centre Street, Manhattan, New York – Foundation stone laid 1819 of a wood-framed structure damaged by fire and rebuilt in 1822.

=== 1820s construction ===
- The (Second) Free African Church of St. Philip (1822), Centre Street, Manhattan, New York – Rebuilt 1822 in brick after fire damaged earlier wooden church. Here, the church had its first rector from 1826 to 1840, the Rev. Peter Williams, Jr., a leading abolitionist. Twice reconstructed, "In 1834, irate whites vandalized the church and in 1863, New York City police used the church as a barracks for militia and police handling draft riots. By 1886 the church was located on 25th Street."
- Second Free Presbyterian Church (Theatre constructed 1824, converted into a church in 1832), Chatham Street—Organized 1832 by Lewis Tappan for the revivalist preacher Charles Grandison Finney and founded in the former Chatham Theatre, which became known as the Chatham Street Chapel The Chatham Street Chapel was abandoned for the purpose-built Broadway Tabernacle (1836), and demolished shortly thereafter.
- Friends Meeting House (1828), 38 Henry Street—Located on Manhattan's Lower East Side. The structure was converted for use as a synagogue by congregation Ansche Chesed in 1840. The building was purchased in 1850 by the Polish Jewish congregation Shaare Zedek (founded in 1837). Shaare Zedek replaced this building with a new building on the same property in 1891 and in 1900 opened a branch synagogue at 25 West 118th Street in the newly-fashionable neighborhood of Harlem. The building is now a church. The Henry Street building was sold to Congregation Mishkan Israel Anshei Suwalk in 1911.

=== 1830s construction ===
- Jones Chapel (c.1830), E. 64th Street, New York City – a timber Greek Doric temple-style church with a prostyle tetra-style pedimented portico.
- West Presbyterian Church (1831–1832), also known as Carmine Street Church, Carmine Street near Varick Street in Greenwich Village—Designed by Town & Davis. It has since been demolished.
- St. Nicholas Greek Orthodox Church (1832, converted into a church in 1922), Liberty Street—Destroyed 2001.
- The Second Middle Collegiate Church (1839), Lafayette Place, near La Grange Terrace – “a single-mindedly classic Greek Revival church by Isaiah Rogers, perhaps his best work. Unfortunately for posterity, the Dutch Reformed (Collegiate) denomination was wealthy enough to move as frequently as the neighborhood ran down. The church’s forerunner was built in 1729 at Nassau Street, later became the Post Office, and was demolished in 1882. After the Lafayette Place church was evacuated in 1887 prior to its destruction, a third church was erected at Second Avenue and 7th Street, “thoroughly equipped” as one guide said, “with reading-rooms, gymnasium, and all appliances for aggressive modern church work.”
- Broadway Tabernacle (1836), 340-344 Broadway, between Worth and Catherine Lane—Built 1836 to designed by Leopold Eidlitz. This was considered one of the most influential churches constructed in America. It was built for the Second Free Presbyterian Church for revivalist preacher Charles Grandison Finney moving from the smaller Chatham Street Chapel. Finney left the church to join the Oberlin College’s Theology Department in April 1837 and the church building was demolished in 1856.
- The Church of the Messiah (1839), Broadway near Waverly Place, Lower East Side, Manhattan—A former Unitarian church sold as a theater and burned down in 1884.

=== 1840s construction ===
- St. George's Church (c.1840), East 7th Street, between Hall Place and Second Ave—A Ukrainian Catholic in the East Village, it was later termed the Old Building by the new Ukrainian Catholic owners before being demolished in 1977: The AIA Guide to NYC described it as “A Greek Revival temple in stucco, with a mini-onion dome.” The new similarly named building on (E. 7th Street southeast corner of Hall Place) was built 1977 to designs by Apollinaire Osadca. The AIA regretted the “domed symbol of the parish’s wealth and burgeoning membership: Miami Beach on 7th Street replaces the real Greek Revival thing.”
- St. Ann's Church (c.1840) -- Sold to the Roman Catholics as the new parish of the same dedication, established in 1852. That parish left 1871 and the church was demolished around 1880.
- Mount Washington Church (1844, enlarged 1856), Broadway and Dyckman Street, a timber Carpentry Gothic church with crenelated tower and spire.
- Church of the Divine Unity (c.1845) -- located in SoHo, built for the Unitarians and transferred to the Universalists before it was used as an art gallery, then an office, and finally was demolished sometime before 1866.
- Hanson Place Central Methodist Church (1847), northwest corner of Hanson Place and Saint Felix Street — A Methodist Episcopal church demolished in 1927 and rebuilt c.1930 as a Gothic church “restyled in modern dress, an exercise in massing brick and limestone. The street level contains retail stores, a surprising but intelligent adjunct to churchly economics.”

=== 1850s construction ===
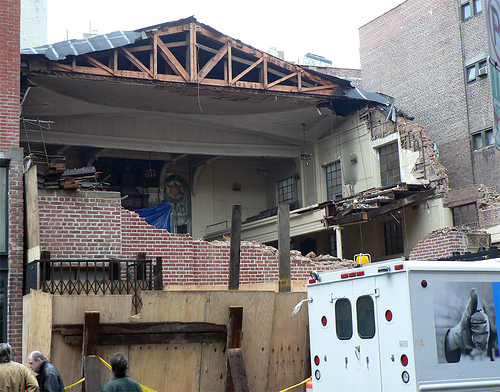
Demolition of the Rivington Street building of the First Roumanian-American Congregation, formerly the First German Presbyterian Church (c.1857). The building was surrounded on the first floor by plywood hoarding. The second and third floors are partially open to the street, and the interior can be seen. Part of the roof has also been torn away, and the joists and trusses are exposed.

- Madison Square Presbyterian Church, built 1853–1854 to designs by Richard Upjohn in the Gothic Revival architectural style, demolished for Stanford White's Madison Square Presbyterian Church.
- German Evangelical Church, (c.1857) 89-93 Rivington Street—Also known as the First German Presbyterian Church, built circa 1857, later purchased by an Orthodox German Jewish congregation in 1864, later the Allen Street Memorial Church in 1890, and finally the First Roumanian-American Congregation (Jewish) in 1902. The building collapsed in January 2006.
- Church of St. Gabriel is a former Roman Catholic parish church under the authority of the Roman Catholic Archdiocese of New York, located at 310 West 37th Street in Manhattan, New York City. The parish was established in 1859. The parish closed in 1939. The Gothic Revival-styled church building was demolished May 1939.

=== 1860s construction ===
- Incarnation Episcopal Church (1864–1865), Thirty-fifth Street and Madison Avenue—Built 1865 to design by Element T. Littell, the church as "distinguished for both its architecture and refined interior decoration and artwork." It was destroyed by fire in 1882, except for its tower and walls and rebuilt and enlarged by David Jardine, with a spire added 1896 to Jardine's designs by Heins & LaFarge.
- West Presbyterian Church (1865), West 42nd Street between Fifth and Sixth Avenue -- "In 1860, following the northward movement of Manhattan’s population, [the congregation] was relocated [from Greenwich Village]...and soon built a Victorian Gothic-style edifice.... West Presbyterian counted a number of distinguished citizens among its membership, including Russell Sage, Jay Gould, and Alfred H. Smith, and by 1890 had become known as the "millionaires’ gate to heaven." By the early 20th century, commercialization of its midtown location led to the displacement of the area’s residential population and the loss of many of West Presbyterian’s members, including the prominent men mentioned above after an internal dispute. As a consequence, [West and Park Presbyterian] began competing for members and decided to merge their memberships, forming the West-Park Presbyterian Church." "The deal between the two organizations included the construction of a new church in Washington Heights at 175th Street and Wadsworth Avenue, called the Fort Washington Presbyterian Church (New York City), which remained affiliated with West Park until 1923."

=== 1870s construction ===
- St. Nicholas Collegiate Reformed Protestant Dutch Church (1872), northwest corner of Fifth Avenue and Forty-eight Street—Designed by W. Wheeler Smith, demolished 1949 for office building.
- St. Johannes Kirche (1873), 217 East 119th Street between Second and Third Avenues—Reused as Iglesia Luterana Sion by the Lutheran Church of America: “An early masonry church for this community, then remote from the center of the city much further downtown. The church began as a home for a German-speaking congregation—today it serves those who speak Spanish.” Demolished in 2007.
- Holy Trinity Episcopal (1874), northeast corner of Madison Avenue and 42nd Street, just a block from Grand Central Station. -- Also known as Dr. Tyng's Church after the hardworking churchman, the younger Stephen H. Tyng, who organized it in 1874. Built to designs by Leopold Eidlitz in a High Victorian hybrid of the German Romanesque design.

=== 1880s construction ===
- The Church of the Sacred Hearts of Jesus and Mary / St. Charles Chapel (1885), President Street off of Van Brunt Street—Established 1882 by Fr. Joseph Fransioli in St. Peter’s Church (corner of Warren and Hicks Streets) as the Catholic Mission of the Italian Colony of the City of Brooklyn, which was the first parish established specifically for Italian immigrants on Long Island. The church was opened in May 1885 but by 1900 a new structure was needed. "During the time on President Street Mother Cabrini came to work at the parish of Sacred Hearts of Jesus and Mary. Recognizing a need to educate the Italian immigrant children, Mother Cabrini and her sisters established a school in the parish in 1892, which was placed under the direction of her order. After the 1906 completion of the new church, Father Vogel felt it necessary to keep the prior church building at President Street open to serve the community as a chapel for the parish under the title of Saint Charles Chapel. The new church was demolished in 1942, condemned by Robert Moses for the BQE.
- The Church of Our Lady of the Scapular of Mount Carmel (c.1889), 341 East 28th Street—Founded in 1889, designed in a "Country Gothic" style. It was previously staffed by the Carmelite Fathers and was the original location of the National Shrine of Our Lady of Mount Carmel, which had been established in 1941 and was moved to Middletown. "Our Lady of the Scapular was merged into Church of St. Stephen the Martyr in the 1980s, and the original building was razed. In January 2007, the Archdiocese of New York announced that the Church of the Sacred Hearts of Mary and Jesus, located at 307 East 33rd Street, would be merged into Our Lady of the Scapular-St. Stephen Church."

=== 1890s construction ===
- All Angel's Church (1890), southeast corner of West End Avenue and West Eighty-first Street—Built as an Episcopalian church to designs by Samuel B. Snook of J.B. Snook & Sons. It was altered 1896 by Karl Bitter Studio: “Turning the axis of this church diagonally to the street grid was a brilliant if subtle design decision which gave character to the intersection (at least until a less-subtle design decision gave it a superhuman television set [the Calhoun School] as competitor across the way). There is an intimate garden adjacent, created by the church’s geometry, reached from West 81st Street.” It was hastily demolished c.1977 and replaced by a large apartment building to the shock of the community.
- Carroll Park Methodist Episcopal Church (c.1890), 295 Carroll Street, Carroll Gardens, Brooklyn — A Victorian Gothic edifice located within the Carroll Gardens historic district. It was reused as the Bethelship Norwegian Methodist Episcopal Church. Both this church and its neighbor above reflect the large Scandinavian population in these parts between the 1890s and 1949. "Sold in 1949 and reused as the South Brooklyn Christian Assembly Church but as of 1977, it was largely demolished and redeveloped into three townhouses with no evidence of the church remaining."
- St. Agnes Chapel (1892), 121-147 West 91st Street, between Amsterdam and Columbus Avenues — St. Agnes Chapel was an Upper West Side Episcopal "plant chapel" of Trinity Church, one of many. It was at first reused by its parish school and then demolished for a gymnasium in the 1940s. The church was built between 1890 and 1892 by William Appleton Potter and widely hailed as one of the greatest churches constructed in the city at that time. A parish school was located adjacent, sharing its midblock location. Downtown Trinity Parish reexamined the small congregation in 1934, already split from nearby Episcopal churches and decided to close it. Eager to expand, the parish school, also named Trinity, bought it as a gymnasium space and demolished it for a more permanent structure in 1943.
- Randall Memorial Church, Sailors' Snug Harbor (1893), -- Named after Robert Richard Randall and built 1893 to designs by English-born New York City architect Robert W. Gibson in the Renaissance Revival architectural style / Baroque Revival architectural style Enrollment at Sailor' Snug Harbor halved between 1935 and 1945 and the diminished population no longer needed two chapels. In 1952, the chapel was demolished after plans to use it as a community and retreat center and/or museum fell through.
- St. Sebastian Roman Catholic Church (1896) -- A Catholic church in Woodside, Queens, New York. The parish was founded May 1894 by Charles McDonnell, Bishop of Brooklyn, and the first building was dedicatedJune 14, 1896. a year after the demise of its architect, Franz J. Berlenbach, Jr. (also known as F.J. Berlenbach, Jr.); while its builder/carpenter was E.J. Coles. A new church was built / remodeled from the Loew's Woodside Theatre that was built 1926 to designs by noted theater architect Herbert J. Krapp. The old church was presumed demolished.

== 20th century ==
=== 1900s construction ===
- Madison Square Presbyterian Church (1906), northeast corner of Madison Avenue and 24th Street. Demolished around 1919 for the Metropolitan Life Tower
- Church of the Sacred Hearts of Mary and Jesus (1906), Degraw and Hicks Streets—Built in 1906 and keeping the previous church as the Chapel of Saint Charles in the same parish. The new church and surrounding buildings were cleared by Robert Moses for the Brooklyn-Queens Expressway. The final mass was celebrated on the morning of December 7, 1941.
- The former Baptist Temple Church (1906–1907), built as the synagogue for Congregation Ohab Zedek Synagogue, was a prominent midblock synagogue located at 18 West 116th Street, Harlem. The congregation sold the synagogue in 1926 and it eventually became The Baptist Temple Church, the final occupants for over fifty years until structural damage necessitated its demolition in 2009–2010.
- Mary Help of Christians (1904), 431 East 12th Street at Avenue A. Built by the local Italian carpenters, bricklayers, stonemasons and plasterers who lived in the neighborhood, and run by the Salesians of St. John Bosco, a Roman Catholic religious order, sold in 2012 to developer Douglas Steiner, who tore it down in 2013 so as to build luxury condominiums on the church's footprint and a large adjoining parking lot. For the year that the church was closed but still standing, the congregation held a Mass on its front steps every Sunday.

=== 1910s construction ===
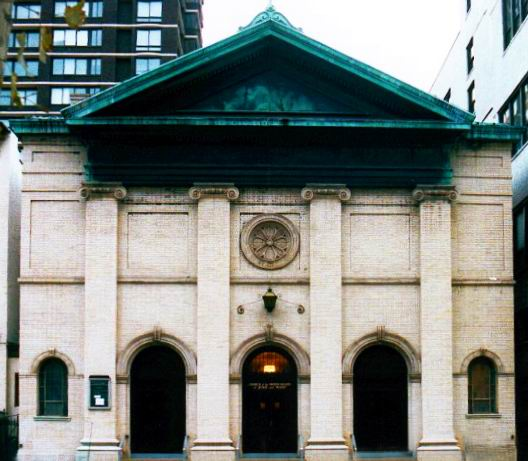
Church of the Sacred Hearts of Mary and Jesus (1915)

- Church of the Sacred Hearts of Mary and Jesus (1915), 307 East 33rd Street—Built 1915 Closed and merged in January 2007 with Our Lady of the Scapular-St. Stephen Church. Reported by the New York Landmarks Conservancy.

=== 1950s construction ===
- Chapel of Saints Faith, Hope, and Charity, Park Avenue at 58th Street - Established in 1958 and closed in 1986; formerly located at Park Ave. at 59th St. (1958–1978).

=== 1960s construction ===
- Trinity Chapel, New York University (1964), 58 Washington Square South, West Village, Manhattan, New York—Built 1961–1964 to designs of Eggers and Higgins, it was the former New York University Catholic Center which was moved to the parish church of St. Joseph’s Church on Sixth Avenue at Waverly Place. It briefly took in the Washington Square Methodist Episcopal Church congregation when they left their 1860s church in 2004. The chapel occupied very exclusive real estate.

== Related pages ==
- List of demolished buildings and structures in New York City
