= William Bradley Isham =

American merchant (1827–1909)

- Born: April 29, 1827; Malden, New York, U.S.
- Died: March 23, 1909 (aged 81); New York City, New York, U.S.
- Known for: namesake of Isham Park
- Spouse: Julia A. Burhans (m. 1852; died 1907)
- Children: Charles; Samuel; William; Porter; Julia; Flora

William Bradley Isham (April 29, 1827 – March 23, 1909) was an American merchant and banker.

== Early life ==
Isham was born in Malden-on-Hudson in Ulster County, New York on April 29, 1827. He was the son of Charles Isham (1784–1856), who was born in Colchester, Connecticut, and Flora (née Bradley) Isham (1797–1845), who was born in Hartford, Connecticut. Among his siblings was sister Flora Eliza Isham and brother Samuel Isham.

His paternal grandparents were Mary (née Adams) Isham and Samuel Isham, a son of John Isham II. His maternal grandparents were Polly (née Hyde) Bradley and Judge William Bradley of Hartford, Connecticut. Through his father, (Note: William Bradley Isham's paternal grandfather, Samuel Isham (1752–1827), was the brother of Dr. Ezra Isham (1773–1835), both sons of John Isham II (1721–1802), who was born at Barnstable, Massachusetts and moved to Colchester, Connecticut. Dr. Ezra Isham was the father of Judge Pierpoint Isham (1802–1872) and grandfather of Edward Swift Isham (1836–1902), the law partner of Robert Todd Lincoln.) he was a distant cousin of Pierpoint Isham, a Justice of the Vermont Supreme Court, and his son, Edward Swift Isham, a lawyer and member of the Illinois House of Representatives.

== Career ==
Along with his brother, Charles, Isham was a leather merchant. They began their business in Malden and, in 1849, he moved to New York City where Isham formed a partnership with George Palen and Isaac H. Bailey. He later owned downtown factories and warehouses on Gold and Cliff Streets.

He later became vice-president of the Union Bank and of the Bank of the Metropolis, and was president of the Bond and Mortgage Guarantee Company. Isham retired in 1890 and sent "the only Manhattan-grown wheat to the Columbia Exposition and to the Chicago World's Fair in 1893."

Isham was a benefactor of the Mount Washington Presbyterian Church and served as a trustee of the Dyckman Library. He was a patron of the American Museum of Natural History, a member of the Down Town Association, the New-York Historical Society, the Chicago Historical Society, the Metropolitan Club, the Riding Club, the Jekyll Island Club, the National Academy of Design, the New England Club, the Metropolitan Museum of Art and the New York Botanical Garden.

=== Real estate ===
In 1862, he rented the former house and estate of the late Dr. Floyd T. Ferris, in uptown Manhattan, as a summer residence. The two-story house, located in the neighborhood now known as Inwood, had been built in the 1850s and was part of the Dyckman tract. Isham purchased the 24 acres (9.7 ha) estate two years later in 1864. The house was situated at the highest point on the property and afforded the Ishams expansive views of the Hudson and Harlem Rivers and the Spuyten Duyvil Creek.

After his death, his daughter Julia Isham Taylor donated 6 acres (2.4 ha) of the estate in 1911 to the City of New York for the creation of Isham Park, named in his honor. Isham's sister, Flora, followed suit and donated more in March 1912. After his son Samuel's death in 1914, the City was bequeathed an additional 24 lots. In October and December 1917, his daughter Julia bought and donated more adjoining land to the City for the park which eventually was restored to the approximate boundaries of the Isham estate, with extra land forming the new Inwood Hill Park.

== Personal life ==
On June 9, 1852, Isham was married to Julia Burhans (1827–1907), the daughter of Rebecca (née Wickes) Burhans and Col. Benjamin Peck Burnhans of Warrensburg, New York. Together, William and Julia were the parents of:

- Charles Bradford Isham (1853–1919), who married Mary Todd "Mamie" Lincoln (1869–1938) in 1891. Mamie was the eldest daughter of Robert Todd Lincoln, and the granddaughter of President Abraham Lincoln and, her namesake, Mary Todd Lincoln.
- Samuel Isham (1855–1914), an artist.
- William Burhans Isham (1857–1929), who took over the leather business and was a close friend of President Woodrow Wilson. He married Hannah Collins (1860–1948), daughter of Richard Smith Collins, and left his residence and one million dollars to Princeton University.
- Porter Isham (1863–c. 1940)
- Julia Isham (1866–1939), who married historian Henry Osborn Taylor (1856–1941) and gave generously to Harvard and Smith Colleges.
- Flora Isham (1873–1934), who married Minturn Post Collins (1870–1957), also a child of Richard Smith Collins, and owned an estate, Islecote, in Bar Harbor, Maine. After her death, Minturn, then 72, remarried Edith Buckingham, who was 23 years-old, in 1943. (Note: Edith Buckingham was the daughter of Komaki Tsunoda of Japan and Marian (née Tonkin) Tsunoda of England.)

Isham died at the age of 81, at his home at 5 East 61st Street in Manhattan, on March 23, 1909.

=== Descendants ===
Through his son Charles, he was the grandfather of Abraham Lincoln "Linc" Isham (1892–1971), who married Leahalma Correa (1892–1960), the daughter of Spaniard, Carlos Correa and Englishwoman, Mary Gooding, in August 1919. They did not have any children together and Linc was among the last living direct descendants of President Lincoln.

Through his daughter Flora, he was the grandfather of William Bradley Isham Collins, Julia Helena Collins (1905–1987), and Minturn Post Collins Jr., also a real estate investor.
