= Charles Bradford Isham =

American historian (1853–1919)

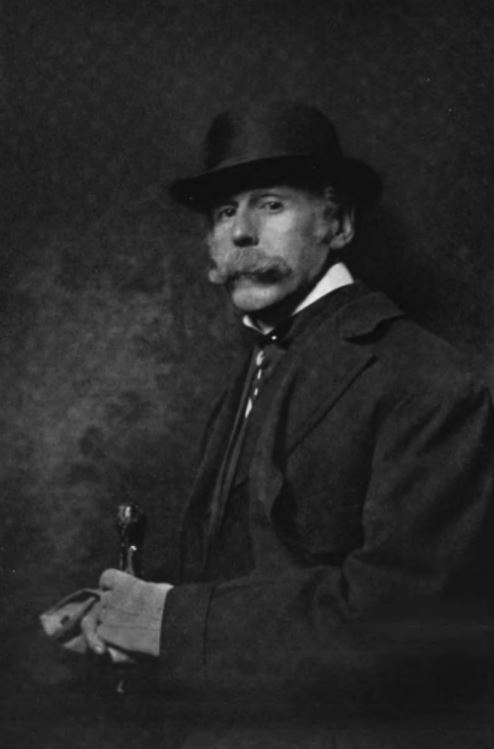

44th President of the Saint Nicholas Society of the City of New York
- In office 1914–1914
- Preceded by: Walter Lispenard Suydam
- Succeeded by: Vernon M. Davis

Personal details
- Born: July 20, 1853 New York City, New York, U.S.
- Died: June 9, 1919 (aged 65) New York City, New York, U.S.
- Spouse: Mamie Lincoln (m. 1891)
- Children: Lincoln Isham
- Parent(s): William Bradley Isham; Julia A. Burhans Isham
- Relatives: Samuel Isham (brother)
- Education: Phillips Academy; Harvard University; University of Berlin; Collège de France

Charles Bradford Isham (July 20, 1853 – June 9, 1919) was an American historian.

== Early life ==
Isham was born in New York City on July 20, 1853. He was the son of William Bradley Isham (1827–1909) and Julia (née Burhans) Isham (1827–1907). His father was a leather merchant who owned downtown factories and warehouses on Gold and Cliff Streets and became vice president of the Bank of the Metropolis and the president of the Bond and Mortgage Guarantee Company. Among his siblings were: sister Julia Isham (wife of Henry Osborn Taylor); and brothers, Samuel Isham, an artist; and William Burhans Isham.

In 1862, his father rented the former house and estate of the late Dr. Floyd T. Ferris in uptown Manhattan as a summer residence. The two-story house, located on forty-acres in the neighborhood now known as Inwood, had been built in the 1850s and was part of the Dyckman tract. Isham purchased the house and estate two years later in 1864. The Isham children later donated, and sold, parcels of the estate to the City of New York for the creation of Isham Park.

His maternal grandfather was Col. Benjamin Burnhans of Warrensburg, New York and his paternal grandparents were Charles Isham and Flora (née Bradley) Isham, a daughter of Judge William Bradley of Hartford, Connecticut.

== Career ==
Isham was educated at Phillips Academy in Andover, Massachusetts before attending Harvard University, where he graduated in 1876. He also studied at the University of Berlin and the Collège de France.

After receiving a law degree from Harvard Law School in 1878, he was admitted to the bar in New York in 1881. In April 1889, Isham was hired as private secretary at the United States Legation in London, while Robert Todd Lincoln was the U.S. Minister to the United Kingdom from 1889 to 1893 (under Benjamin Harrison and Grover Cleveland). Reportedly, Isham obtained the position through his distant cousin, Edward Swift Isham, Lincoln's former law partner. Lincoln, the son of the 16th President Abraham Lincoln, had previously been the United States Secretary of War (under James Garfield and Chester A. Arthur).

Isham, who was fluent in German and French, was, foremost, a historian with a reputation "as a learned scholar and brilliant intellectual." He served as Resident Graduate in History at Harvard and the Librarian of the New-York Historical Society, of which his father had been a member. In 1895, he gave a speech at the Society about the importance of the Louisburg Expedition of 1745.

== Personal life ==
On September 2, 1891, Isham was married to Mary Todd "Mamie" Lincoln (1869–1938) at the Brompton Parish Church in London, England. Mamie was the eldest daughter of Mary Eunice (née Harlan) Lincoln, and Robert Todd Lincoln, and the granddaughter of President Lincoln and, her namesake, Mary Todd Lincoln. Isham and his wife bought a place in Manchester, Vermont, later known as the 1811 house, until they moved to New York City, residing at 19 East 72nd Street. Together, Charles and Mamie were the parents of one child:

- Abraham Lincoln Isham (1892–1971), who married Leahalma Correa (1892–1960), the daughter of Spaniard, Carlos Correa and Englishwoman, Mary Gooding, in August 1919. They did not have any children together.

After a short illness, Isham died at his residence, 122 East 38th Street in New York City, on June 9, 1919. After a funeral held at Grace Church on Broadway, he was buried at Woodlawn Cemetery in the Bronx. His widow died nineteen years later in November 1938.
