= Jones Chapel =

Jones Chapel may refer to:

- Jones Chapel, Alabama, a community
- Jones Chapel (New York City), a church
