= Henry Osborn Taylor =

American historian and legal scholar

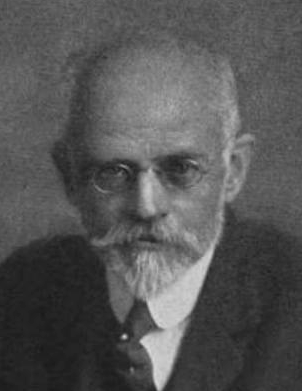

President of the American Historical Association
- In office 1927–1927
- Preceded by: Dana Carleton Munro
- Succeeded by: James Henry Breasted

Personal details
- Born: December 5, 1856 New York City, New York, U.S.
- Died: April 13, 1941 (aged 84) New York City, New York, U.S.
- Spouse: Julia Isham
- Education: Harvard University; Columbia University
- Occupation: Historian and legal scholar

Henry Osborn Taylor (December 5, 1856 – April 13, 1941) was an American historian and legal scholar.

== Career ==
Taylor graduated from Harvard University in 1878 and, later, from Columbia Law School. He later received honorary degrees from Harvard and Columbia.

Taylor was a philosopher and the author of several important works on ancient and medieval history. He was elected to the American Philosophical Society in 1926. In 1927, he served as the president of the American Historical Association.

== Personal life ==
Taylor was married to the philanthropist Julia Isham (1866–1939). Julia, the daughter of prominent merchant William Bradley Isham, was the sister of historian Charles Bradford Isham (who married Mamie Lincoln, granddaughter of President Abraham Lincoln) and artist Samuel Isham. Julia donated property from her late father's estate, which became Isham Park in Inwood, Manhattan, and gave generously to Harvard and Smith Colleges.

After a week's illness, Taylor died of pneumonia at his home, 135 East 66th Street in New York City on April 13, 1941. He was buried at Union Hill Cemetery in East Hampton, Connecticut.

== Published works ==
- A Treatise on the Law of Private Corporations Having Capital Stock, The Banks Law Publishing Co., 1904 [1st Pub. Kay & Brother, 1884].
- The Classical Heritage of the Middle Ages, The Columbia University Press, 1901 (2nd ed., 1903; 3rd ed., 1911; 4th ed. New York, F. Ungar Pub. Co., 1957).
  - The Emergence of Christian Culture in the West: the Classical Heritage of the Middle Ages, Harper, 1958.
- The Mediaeval Mind; a History of the Development of Thought and Emotion in the Middle Ages, 2 Vols, Macmillan Company, 1911.
- Ancient Ideals; a Study of Intellectual and Spiritual Growth from Early times to the Establishment of Christianity, 2 Vols, The Macmillan Company, 1913 (Reprint., New York: F. Ungar Pub. Co., 1964).
- Deliverance, the Freeing of the Spirit in the Ancient World, The Macmillan Company, 1915.
- Prophets, Poets and Philosophers of the Ancient World, The Macmillan Company, 1919 [1st Pub. 1915].
- Thought and Expression in the Sixteenth Century, 2 Vols, Macmillan Company, 1920.
- Greek Biology and Medicine, Marshall Jones Company, 1922.
- Freedom of the Mind in History, New York, 1923 [Reprint., Westport, Conn.: Greenwood Press, 1970].
- Human Values and Verities, Macmillan & Co., Limited, 1928.
- Fact: The Romance of Mind, The Macmillan Company, 1932.
- A Layman's View of History, The Macmillan Company, 1935 [Reprint, New York: AMS Press, 1978].
- A Historian's Creed, Harvard University Press, 1939 (Reprint, Port Washington, N.Y.: Kennikat Press, 1969).
- The Humanism of Italy, Collier, 1962.
- The French Mind, Collier, 1962.

=== Articles ===
- "Development of Constitutional Government in the American Colonies," The Magazine of American History, Vol. II, N°. 12, December 1878.
- "Héloïse," The International Quarterly, Vol. VI, 1902/1903.
- "The Worlds of Salimbene," The International Quarterly, Vol. XII, October 1905/January 1906.
- "The Wisdom of the Ages," The Yale Review, Vol. VII, 1918.
- "Modern Civilization," The Saturday Review, November 3, 1928.
- "Annals of Culture," The Saturday Review, April 19, 1930.
