= Samuel Isham =

American painter

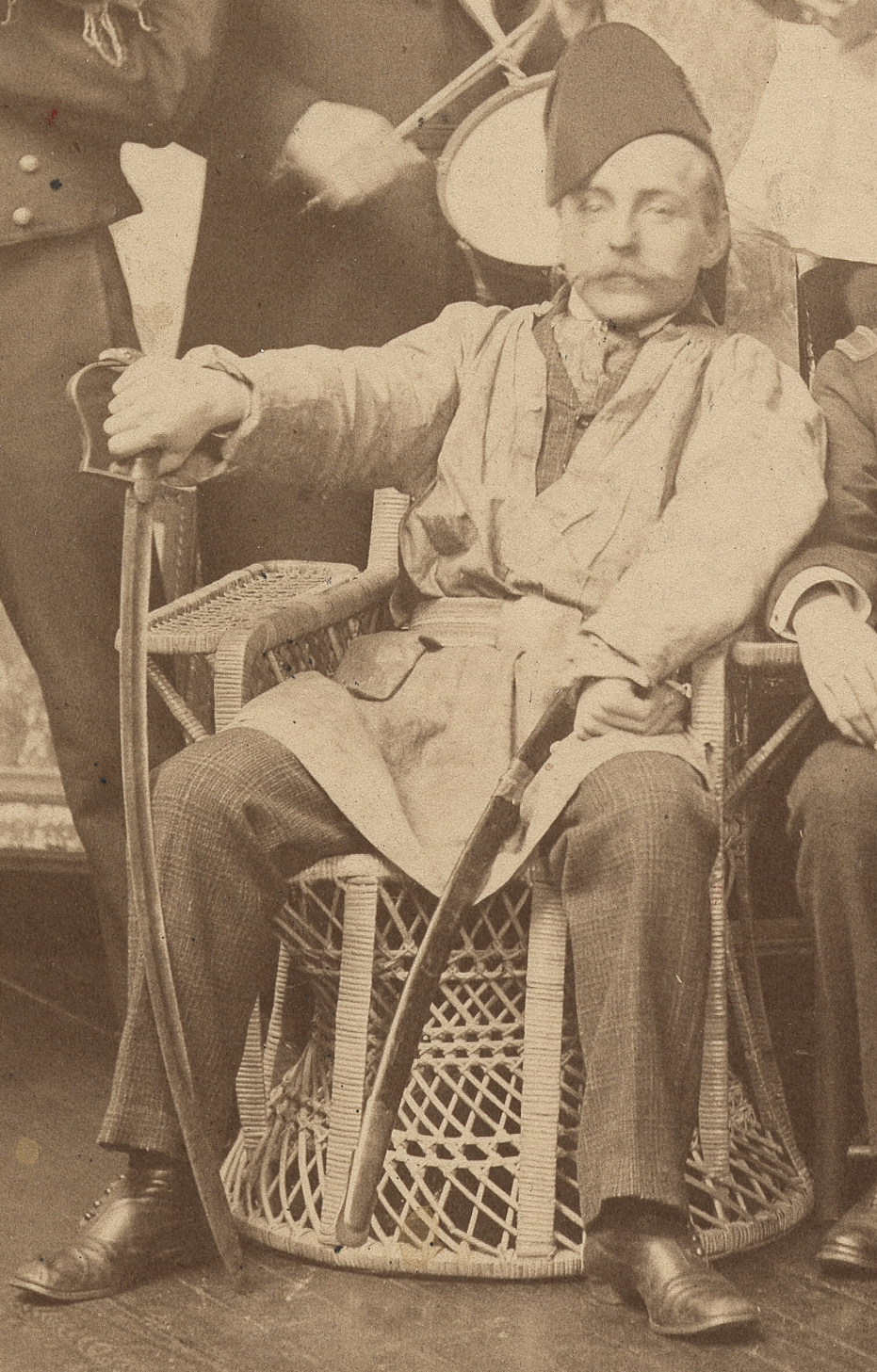
- Samuel Isham in costume, Sherwood Studio Building (1889)
- Born: May 12, 1855; New York City, New York, U.S.
- Died: June 12, 1914 (aged 59); East Hampton, New York, U.S.
- Burial place: Woodlawn Cemetery
- Education: Phillips Academy; Yale University (B.F.A.); Columbia Law School; Académie Julian
- Occupations: Painter and writer
- Known for: History of American Painting (1905)
- Father: William Bradley Isham
- Relatives: Charles Bradford Isham (brother); Henry Osborn Taylor (brother-in-law); Mamie Lincoln Isham (sister-in-law)
- Honors: National Academy of Design

Samuel Isham (May 12, 1855 – June 12, 1914) was an American portrait and figure painter.

== Early life ==
Samuel Isham was born in New York City on May 12, 1855. He was the son of William Bradley Isham (1827–1909) and Julia Burhans (1827–1907). His father was a leather merchant who owned downtown factories and warehouses on Gold and Cliff Streets, and became vice-president of the Bank of the Metropolis and the president of the Bond and Mortgage Guarantee Company. Among his siblings was Charles Bradford Isham, who married Mamie Lincoln (granddaughter of Abraham Lincoln); and Julia Isham, who married historian Henry Osborn Taylor.

After preparing at Phillips Academy, he studied at Yale, where he was a member of the third editorial board of The Yale Record, and graduated in 1875 with a B.F.A. degree.

== Career ==
After Yale, Isham traveled abroad for three years and then studied law at Columbia Law School, beginning in the fall of 1878, and was admitted to the bar. He began practicing in the office of Lord Day & Lord before forming a partnership with George E. Coney in 1881.

=== Art career ===
A few years later, however, Isham opted out of a career in law and turned to art. He again went abroad, studying painting in Paris at the Académie Julian from 1885 to 1887 under Gustave Boulanger and Jules Joseph Lefebvre.

He exhibited at both Paris salons and at the larger American exhibitions. He was a member of the Art Jury at the Pan-American Exposition in Buffalo, New York in 1901, and became a member of the National Academy in 1906. At the St. Louis World's Fair in 1904, he won the silver medal. He was also a director of the Fine Arts Society and a member of the National Institute of Arts and Letters, both in New York City.

His most notable achievement was his History of American Painting, published in 1905. It received high praise for its adequate treatment, sympathetic usually just appreciations, and pleasing style.

== Personal life ==
Isham, who did not marry and lived at 471 Park Avenue in Manhattan, was a member of the Maidstone Club (in East Hampton, New York), Ardsley Club (in Irvington, New York), the Metropolitan Club, the Players' Club, and the University Club of New York.

On June 12, 1914, Isham suffered from an aneurysm of the arteries and died on the Maidstone Club golf course in East Hampton. He was buried in Woodlawn Cemetery in the Bronx. After his death, his estate presented 236 Japanese color prints from his personal collection to the Metropolitan Museum of Art.

== Gallery ==
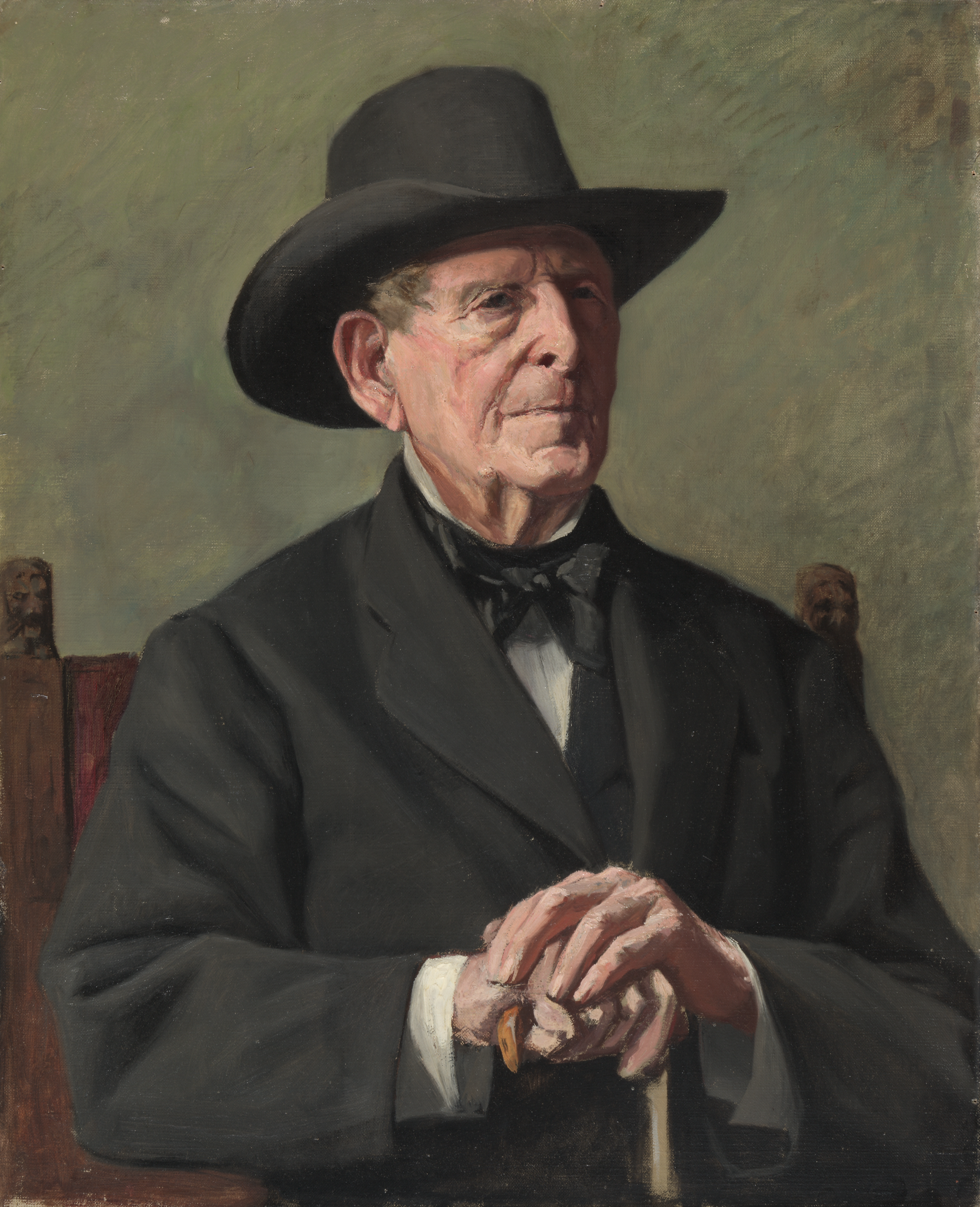
Portrait of an "Old Sea Captain", c. 1890 – c. 1899

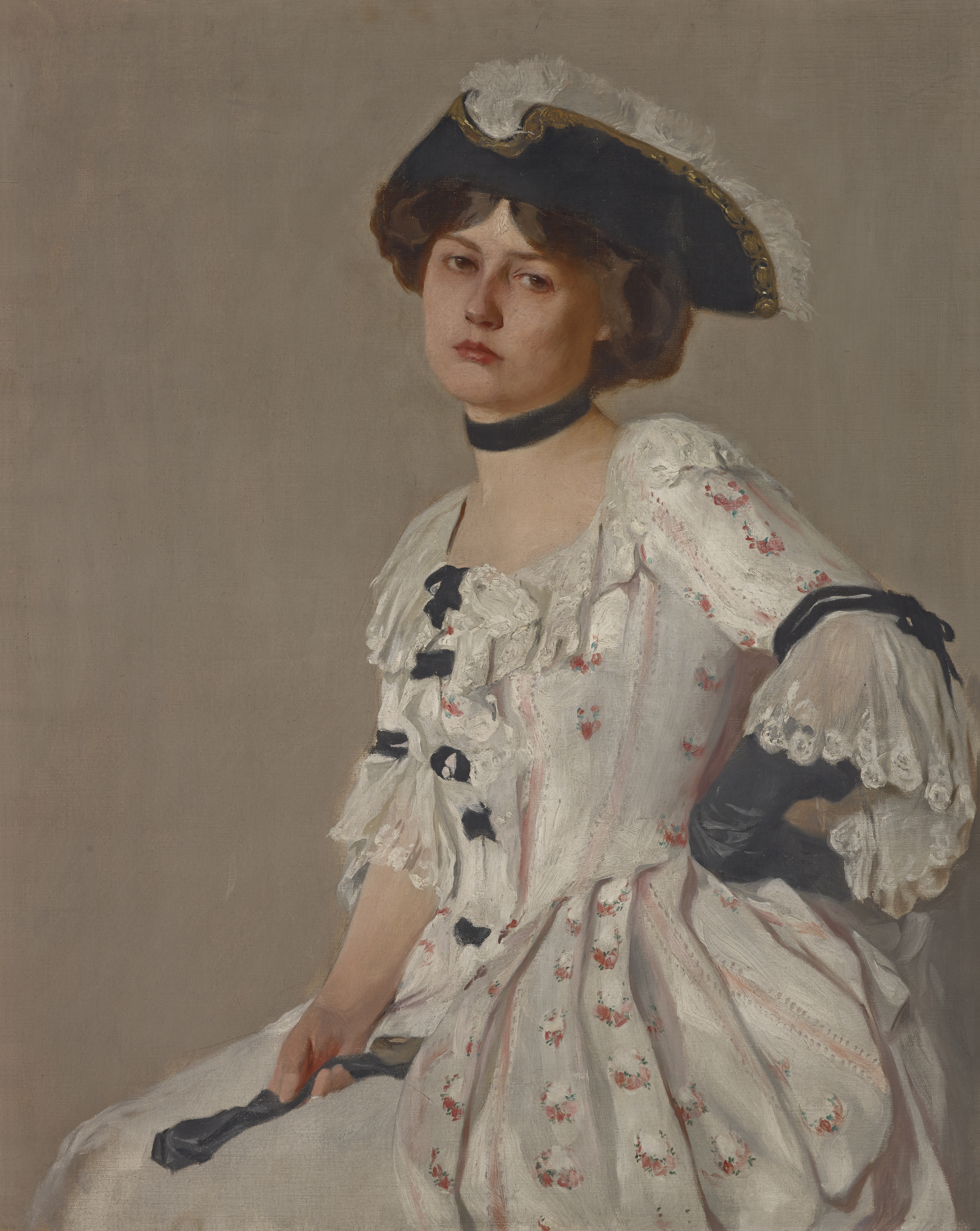
Girl in White with Hat

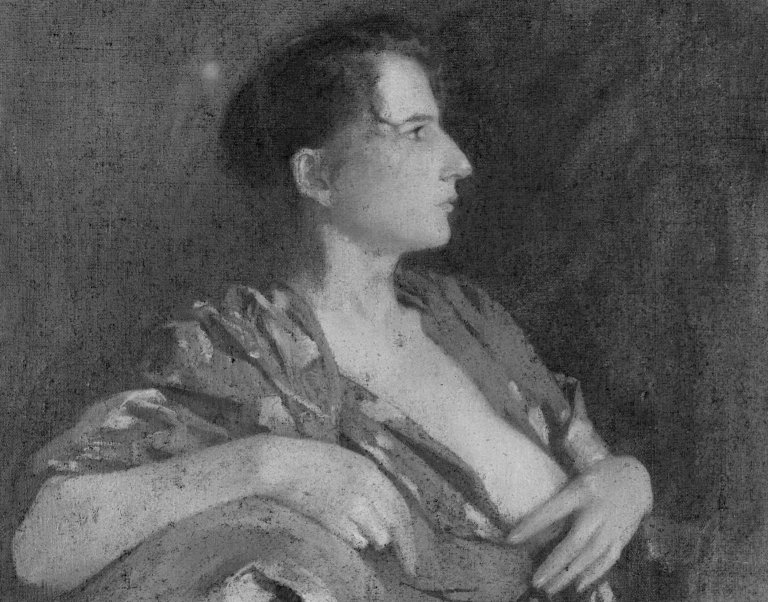
The Lilac Kimono, c. 1895 – c. 1900

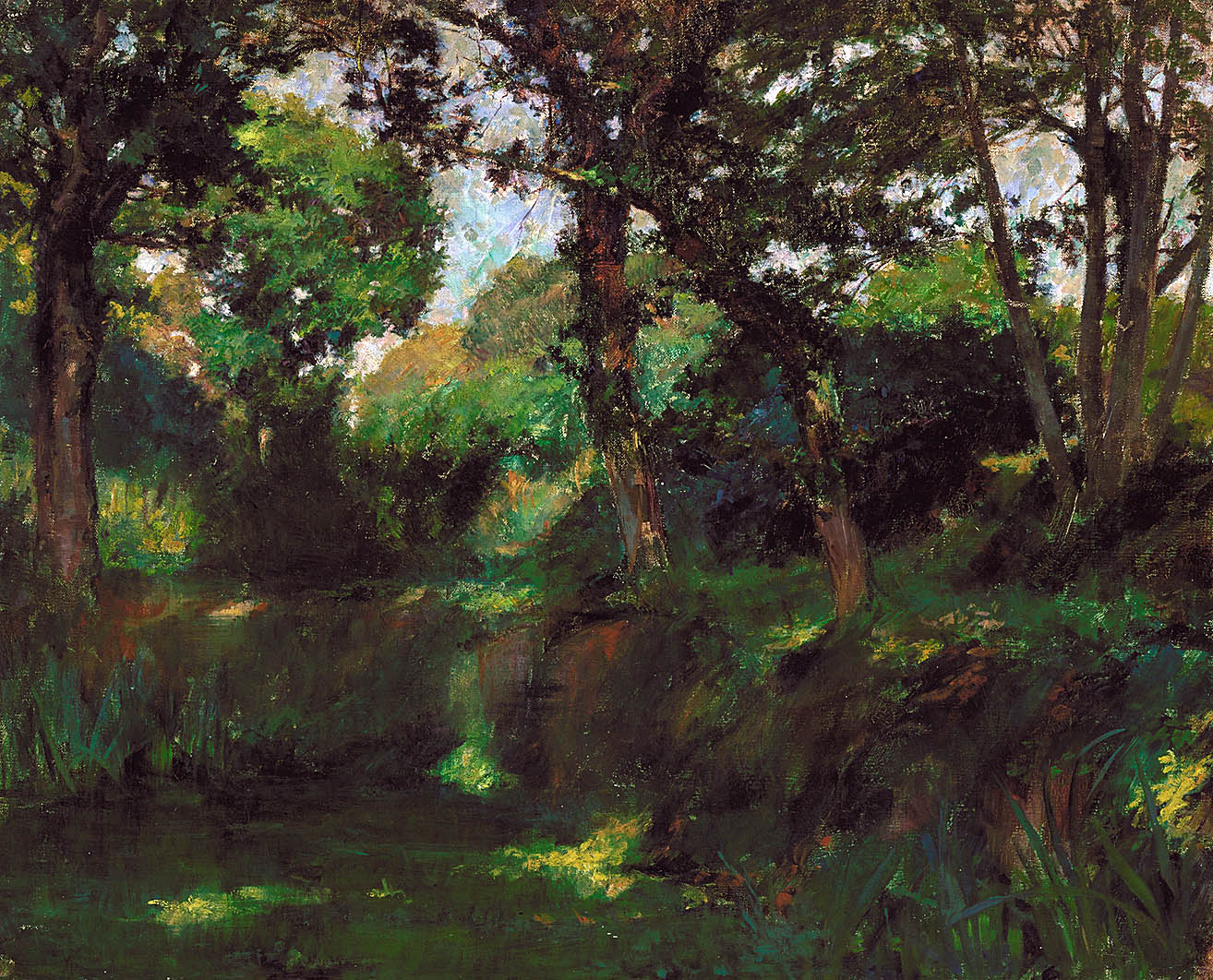
Wooded Landscape, c. 1890 – c. 1899

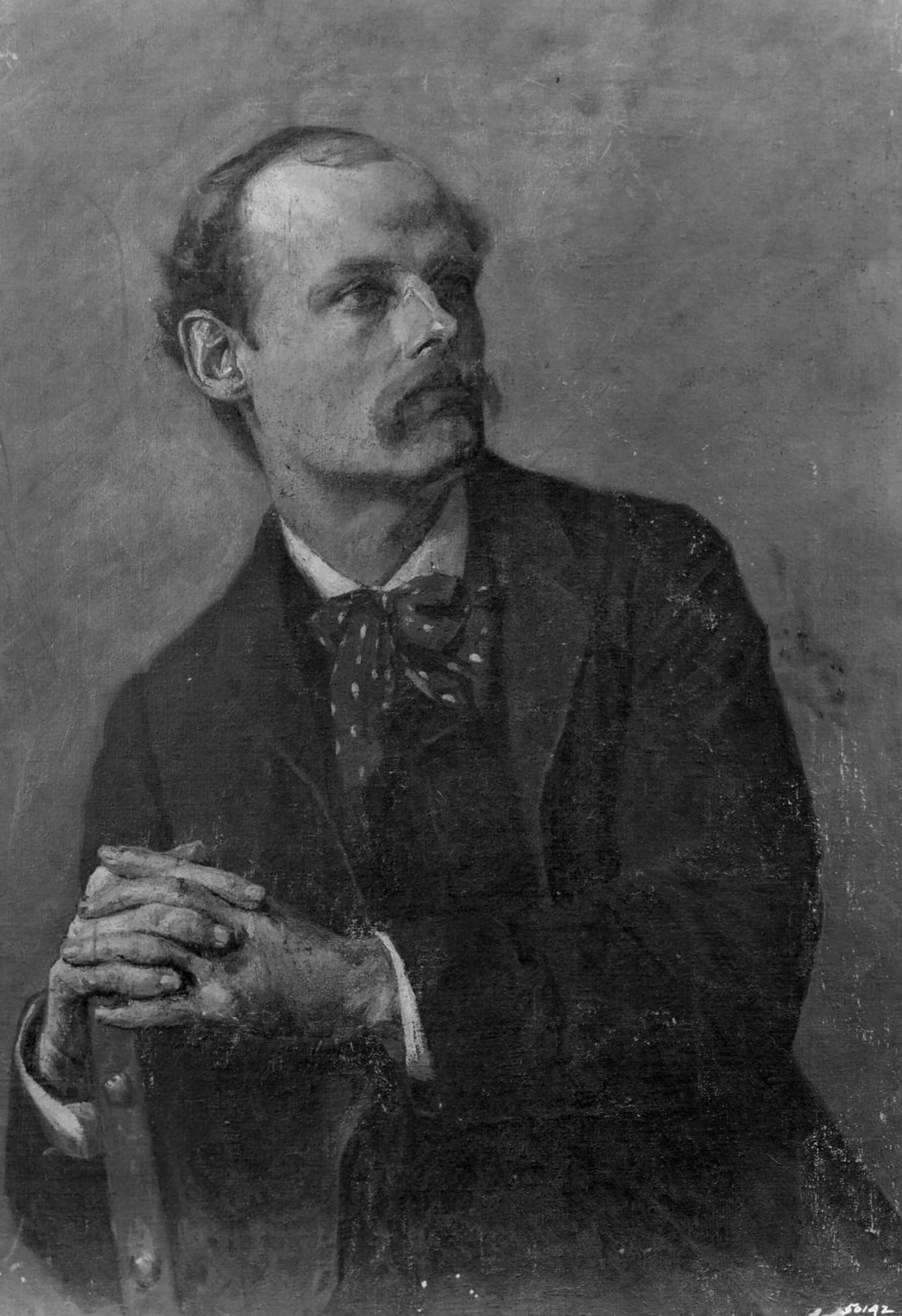
Portrait of John Goddard Stearns Jr. c. 1895
