= St. Sebastian Roman Catholic Church (Queens) =

Church building in New York City, United States

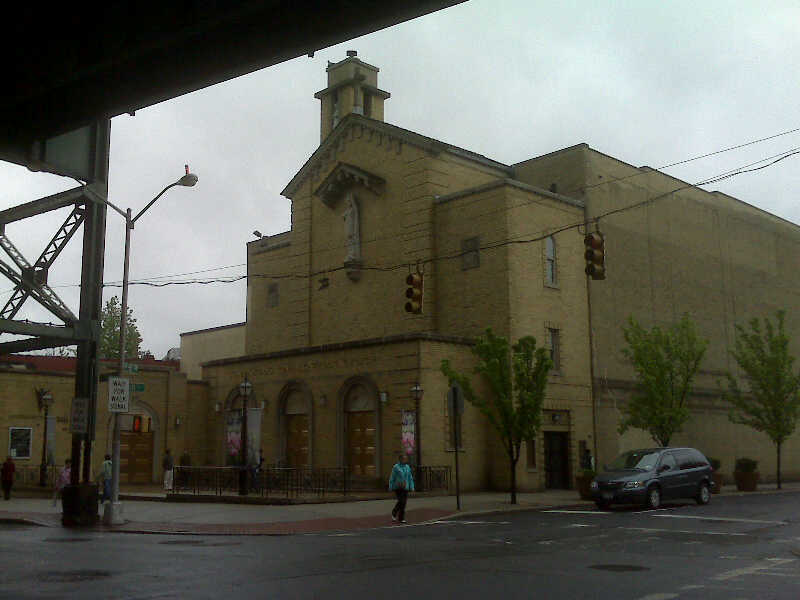

Religion
- Affiliation: Roman Catholic
- Ecclesiastical or organizational status: Parish Church
- Year consecrated: 1896 (old church); 1952 (new church)
- Status: Active

Location
- Location: New York City, United States
- Interactive map of St. Sebastian Roman Catholic Church
- Coordinates: 40°44′41.9″N 73°54′23.6″W

Architecture
- Architects: Berlenbach, F.J. (1896 church); Herbert J. Krapp (1952 church)
- Style: Romanesque Revival
- Completed: 1952

Specifications
- Length: 55 metres (180 ft)
- Width: 25 metres (82 ft)

Website
- saintsebastianwoodside.org/

St. Sebastian Roman Catholic Church is a parish church in the Diocese of Brooklyn in Woodside, Queens, New York City.

Although the parish of St. Sebastian itself was founded in May 1894 by Bishop Charles McDonnell of Brooklyn, New York, there was no building for the congregation until June 14, 1896 when the parish's first building was dedicated a year after the demise of its architect Franz J. Berlenbach, Jr.

A new and permanent church building for the parish was later erected in 1952, on the location of a former cinema. Fr. Edward Gannon was the first pastor of the parish. The current church building is located on Roosevelt Avenue at 58th Street.

== Historical background ==
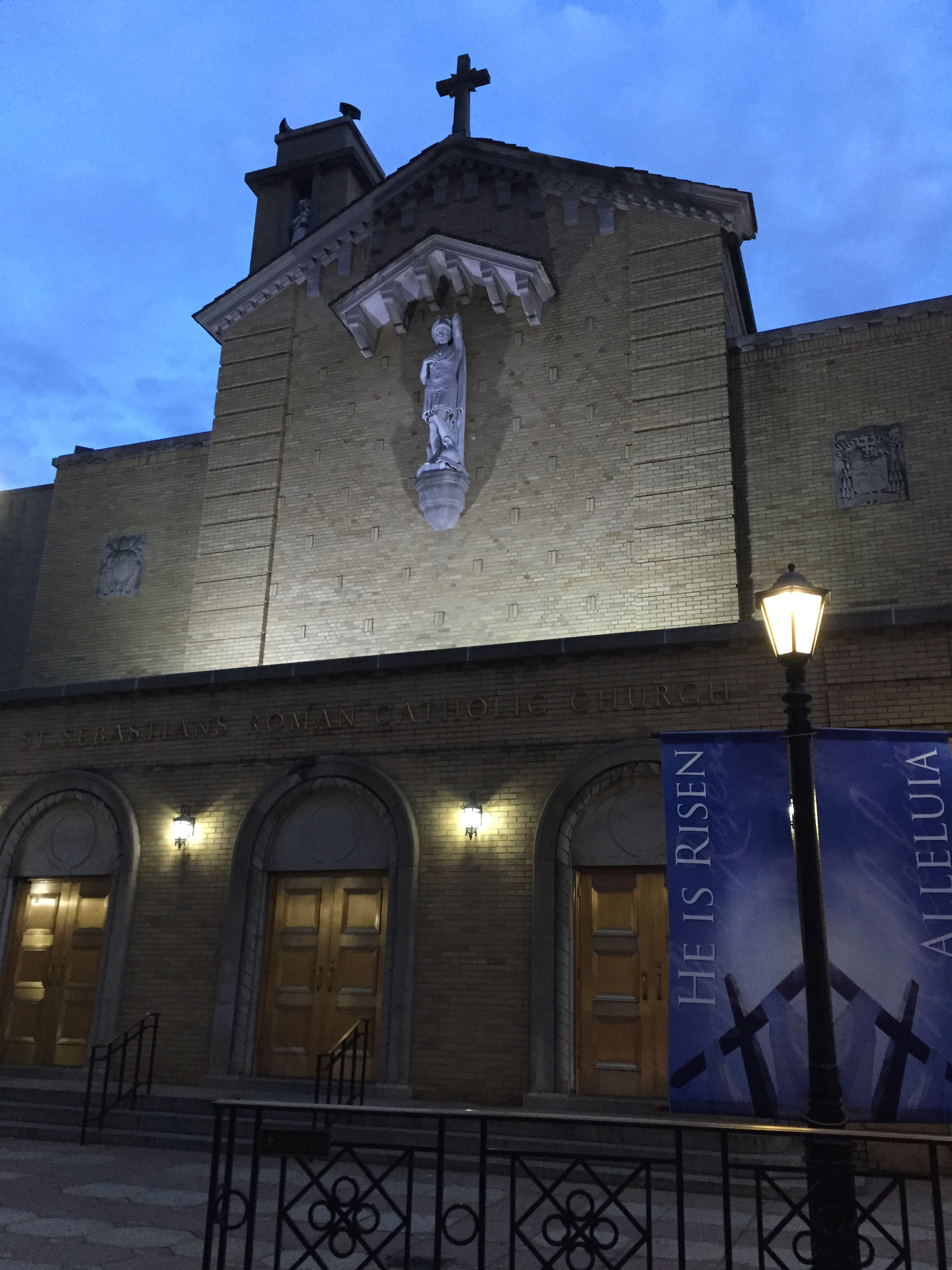
The church during twilight

Prior to becoming a church site, the current St. Sebastian Roman Catholic Church was the former location of Loew's Woodside Theatre, a movie theatre that opened on September 27, 1926, and designed by Herbert J. Krapp. It had the capacity to seat 2,000 people. On its opening night, it once screened a pre-release version of Buster Keaton's comedy film, the Battling Butler. Later in 1955, it was sold to the St. Sebastian Roman Catholic parish in order to found a chapel which was transformed into a church building. The construction of the church began with the demolition of the entrance and lobby of the theatre, where a Romanesque bell tower was erected. The theatre's original auditorium decor was kept and restored, along with "the domed ceiling, 40 columns along the side walls that were returned to their original marble with gold leaf capitals".

Formally founded as a parish in 1894, St. Sebastian Roman Catholic parish was originally intended to provide religious services to German factory workers and immigrants of Queens County. Afterwards, it became the religious center of immigrants from Ireland. As of 2014, Sunday Mass attendees include those of Hispanic (45%), Irish (25%), Filipino (25%), and Korean (5%) descent; which in total averages 4,000 people. Masses are celebrated primarily in English, but also in Spanish, and occasionally in Tagalog and Korean as well.

The New York City Organ Project has documented the musical organs used or formerly used by the St. Sebastian Catholic Church, namely the III/Rodgers Instruments electronic organ, the II/Midmer-Losh Organ Company organ in 1930, and the I/6 Geo. Jardine & Son organ in 1878 for the church proper, and the II/Rodgers Instruments organ for its chapel.

After Monsignor D. Joseph Finnerty and Msgr. Michael J. Hardiman the current pastor and administrator of St. Sebastian is Rev. Patrick J. West. The parish complex includes a convent, a rectory, a parish center (with a fitness center).

In 1926, the parish school, St. Sebastian School, was founded. It transitioned to St. Sebastian Catholic Academy in 2015.

The rectory is located at 39-63 57th Street.
