= Isham Park =

Public park in Manhattan, New York

Coordinates: 40°52′11″N 73°55′09″W

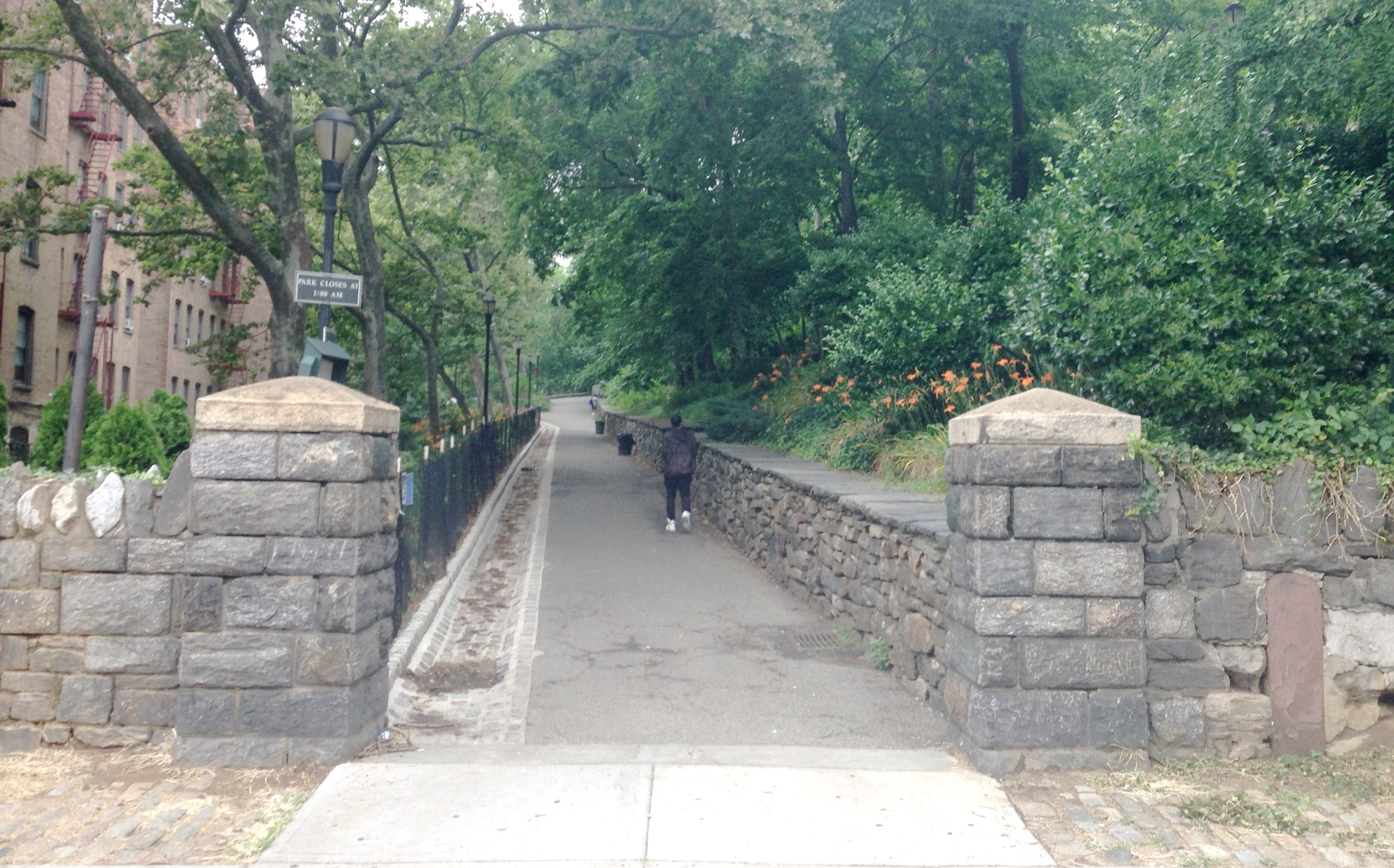
The entrance to the park on Broadway near Isham Street (June 2016) The red stone marker to the right is the original 12th mile marker on the Kingsbridge road(Old Boston Post Rd.) from 189th st.

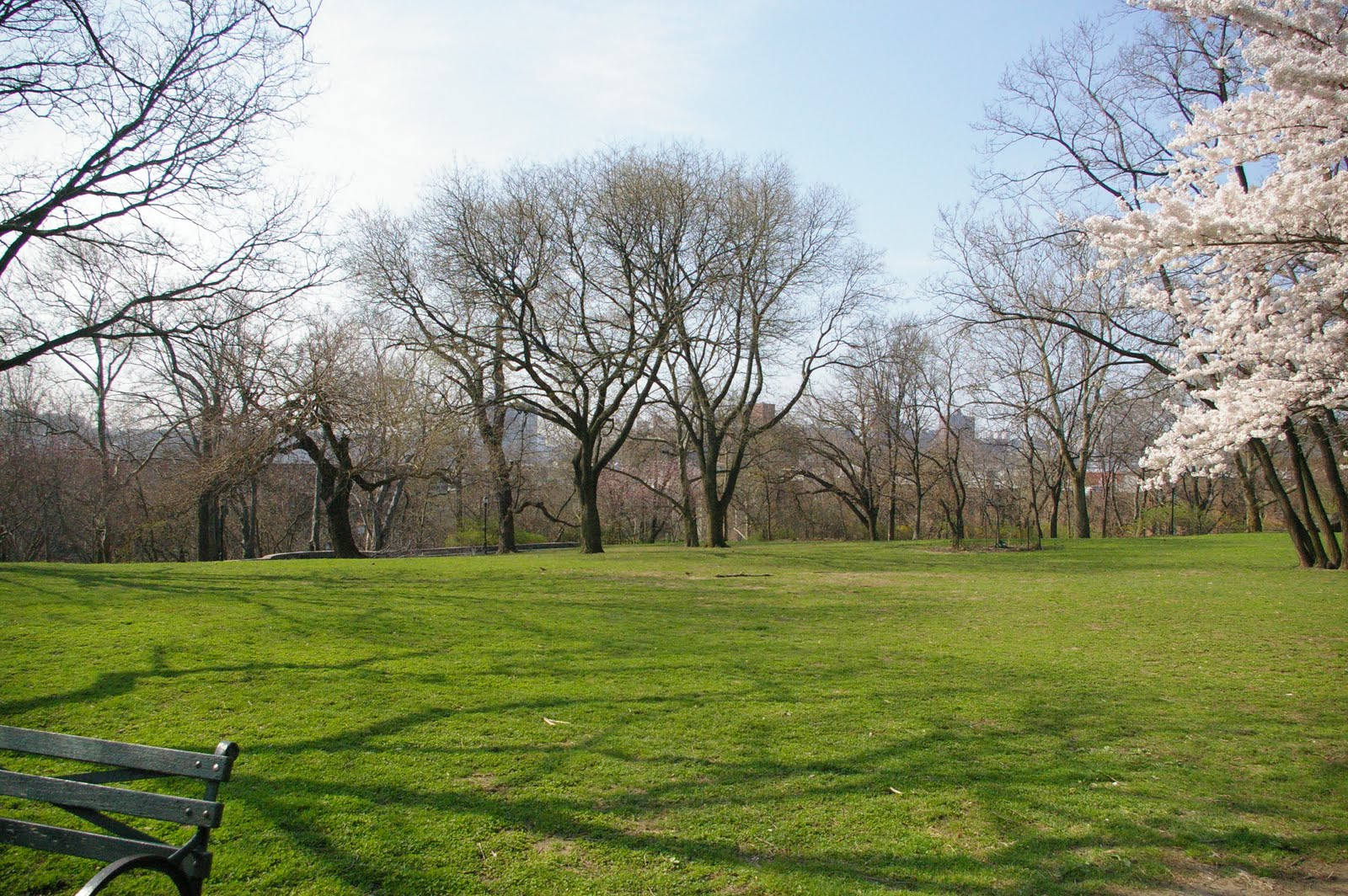
Isham Park's central lawn, at the top of the hill (April, 2010)

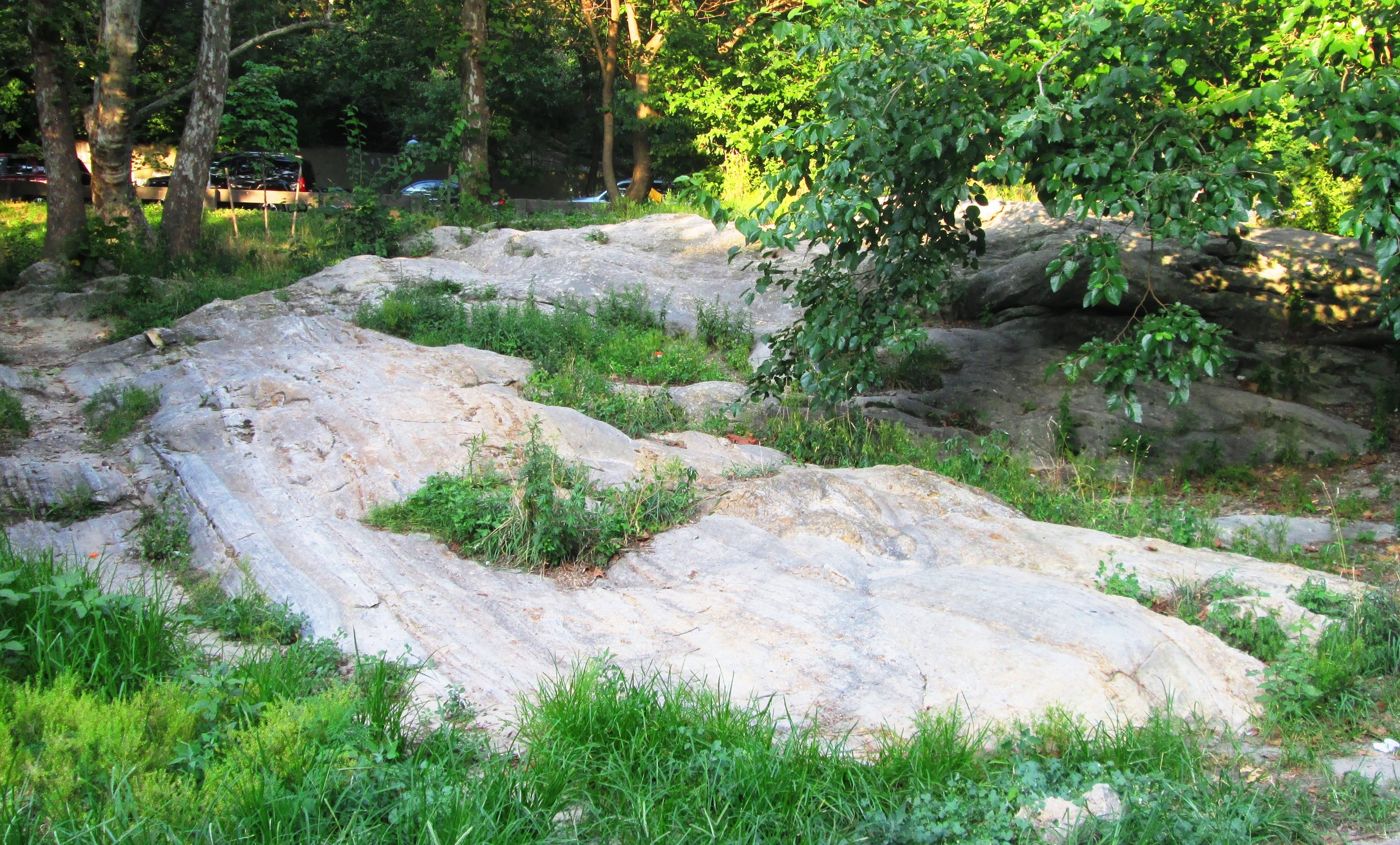
An outcropping of marble in Isham Park (July 2016)

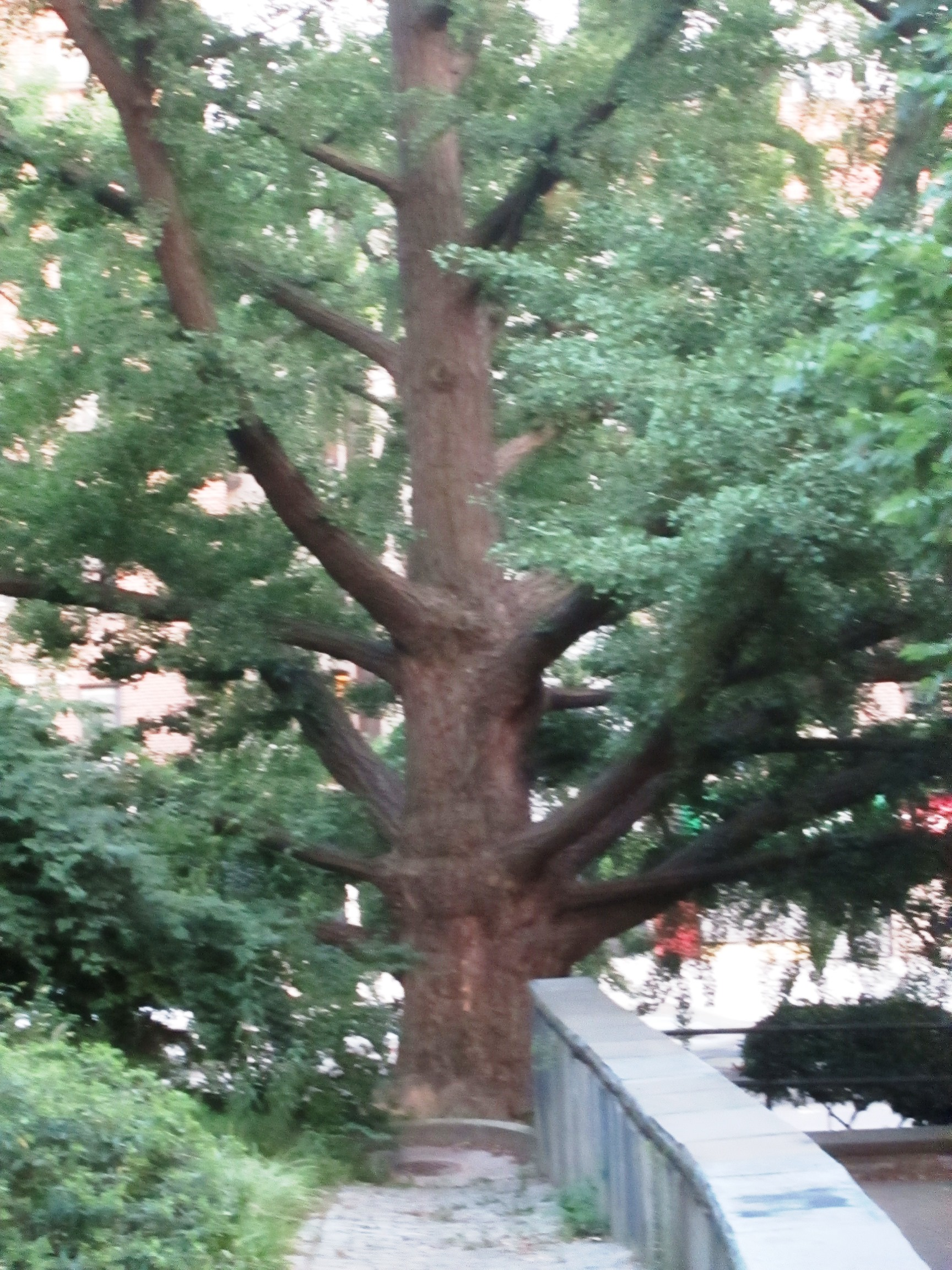
A ginkgo biloba tree in the park; it was named one of New York City's "Great Trees" in 1985. (July 2016)

Isham Park is a 20-acre (81,000 m^{2}) historic park located in Inwood, Manhattan, New York City. The park was created in large part through gifts to the city from the Isham family of land from the William Bradley Isham estate. It sits roughly between Broadway, Isham Street, Seaman Avenue, and West 214th and 215th Streets.

The park once extended to the Harlem River, but after the creation of Inwood Hill Park and the reconfiguration of area streets, the boundary became Seaman Avenue. The extent of the current park now equals that of the original Isham estate. The Isham mansion, which originally came with the park gift, was torn down in the 1940s due to its deteriorating condition.

Isham Park is noted at its southern end for some exposed marble outcroppings which date from the Cambrian period. This is a popular location for college geology classes to visit. There is a public garden in the northeastern corner. Much of the rest of the park has trees and brush growing in a rather wild manner, although the center of the park at the top of the hill is a grass lawn.

== History ==
William Bradley Isham (pronounced EYE-sham), was a leather merchant whose factories and warehouses were located at 91 and 93 Gold Street and 61 Cliff Street, and who also became the vice-president and later a director of the Bank of the Metropolis, and the president of the Bond and Mortgage Guarantee Company. Isham was a successful man. He was a patron of the American Museum of Natural History, a member of the prestigious Down Town Association, the New-York Historical Society and the Chicago Historical Society, the Metropolitan Club and the Riding Club, the National Academy of Design, the New England Club, the Metropolitan Museum of Art and the New York Botanical Garden. He lived at 5 East 61st Street near Fifth Avenue.

In 1862, Isham rented as a summer residence a house and property in uptown Manhattan, in the neighborhood now known as Inwood, from the estate of Dr. Floyd T. Ferris, a well-known physician who had died seven years earlier. The two-story house had been built in the 1850s and was later described as "...an interesting brick and frame building of peculiar shape, having a spacious central hall with a winding staircase and gallery from which the rooms extend in three wings...". With four wings laid out as a cross, with the entrance to the house in the central area, improved the light and ventilation available for each of the wings, and the house's placement on a hilltop in the middle of Manhattan Island, with views of both the Hudson River to the west and the Harlem River to the east insured that the estate would always be subject to cool breezes.

Two years after first renting it, Isham bought the property as his summer estate. It included 24 acres (9.7 ha) of land, the two-story house, a greenhouse, a gardener's cottage, a stable, and a cold spring, one of the few natural sources of fresh water in the area. James Reuel Smith said about the spring in 1898 that

it is at the foot of one of four little fruit trees, which, with two others a short distance away, are all that is left of what was perhaps long ago a flourishing orchard. The tree behind the spring looks like a peach tree. Buttercups grow around it. Wild birds sing in the four fruit trees and drink at the spring. Their piping song mingles with the whistling tugs on the Canal.

The spring rises at the base of a small rock. It is eighteen inches deep and about twenty inches across. Natural rock forms the back of its basin, and in the front a piece of white Kingsbridge marble, which has become slimy and yellowish-brown.

Bubbles rise from the bottom, which is somewhat sandy and over which a conical fungus grows. The water is not cold but cool. Although exposed to the direct rays of the sun. I drank from it, and found it a trifle salty.

Later, William's son Samuel described the condition of the estate when his father bought it:

It was then very rough, much of it a tangled thicket of red cedars, but the lawns about the house had been carefully kept up. He cleared it, moved the stable from the top of the hill... regraded the whole hill from top to bottom, planted nearly all of the trees that now remain, and in fact remade the place ... At that time the surroundings were only beginning to be suburban. The Kingsbridge Road [now Broadway] was a good dirt country road – long regretted by us after it had been graded and widened, for the new street remained for years unpaved – a waste of dust in dry weather and a slough of mud in wet.

Our house ... has remained almost unchanged. In fact, its peculiar plan rendered extension practically impossible. ... From our gate up to the north end of the island extends almost the only marble formation in Manhattan. (I have the impression that there is one other.) Down by the creek there were kilns built to burn the marble into lime.

The old stone building, [which became a barn], was used to store the lime, which was shipped in sloops from a dock in the creek. This end of the place was probably its main center of activity a century ago. There was a small house there in 1862 used by the gardener, and though that was comparatively recent, there were other signs like apple orchards and the like which indicated that a farmhouse had stood there. A stronger argument is a spring of pure, cold water on the bank at the edge of the swamp. Near this spring [was] a cherry tree which must now be well over 100 years old and which shows its age. It used to yield an abundance of dark sweet cherries, and I suppose it may be the sole surviving specimen of the ‘Dyckman Cherry’ a species famous in its day, but now supposed to be extinct.

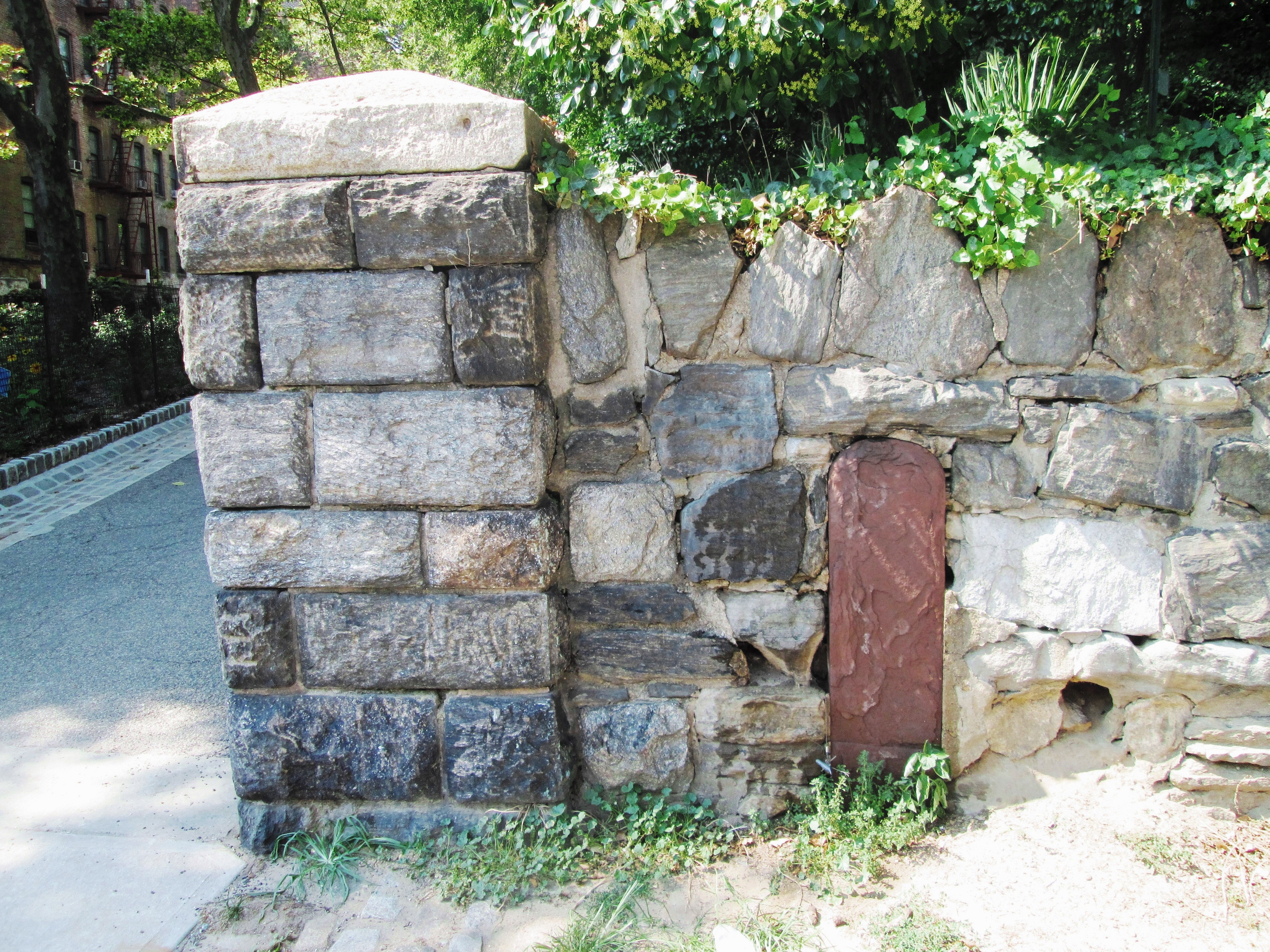
The brown "12 Mile" milestone to right of the entrance

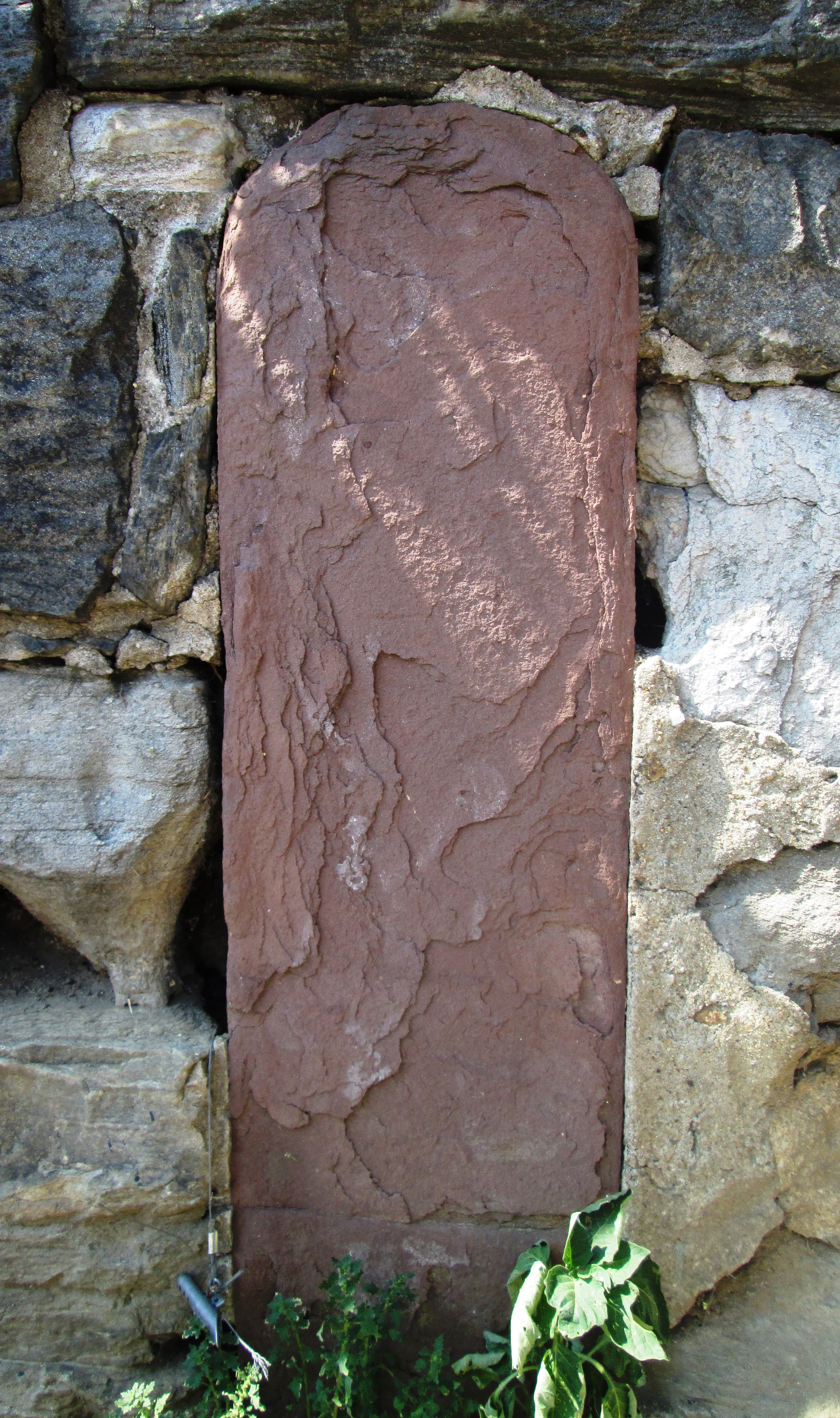
A closeup of the milestone; all the original writing has eroded away

When Isham was having a wall built or reconstructed along the Broadway edge of the estate, a workman found an old milestone that reads "12 Miles from New York", which had once stood on the Kingsbridge Road (which became Broadway). When Isham found out about it, he had the milestone built into the wall, just north of the entrance to the estate, where it still exists. Unfortunately because the milestone was made of soft brownstone, all the original lettering has worn away.

Isham operated the property as a farm, but, according to his son, for pleasure and not for profit. He is said to have harvested the last wheat grown on Manhattan Island, some of which was sent to the 1893 Chicago World's Fair.

== From estate to park ==
William Isham died in 1909 in his house on 61st Street, and in June 1911, his daughter, Julia Isham Taylor presented almost 6 acres (2.4 ha) of the estate to New York City on the condition that it be made into a park named after her father. Her aunt, Flora E. Isham followed suit in March of the following year. In September 1912, more than 5,000 people celebrated the gift of the new park, with a march to the park, speeches by dignitaries, and folk dances performed by children.

In March 1915, Samuel, who died of an aneurysm June 1914, bequeaths to the city another 24 lots of land, which the city receives in April 1915.

In October 1917, Taylor bought the land at the corner of Isham Street and Seaman Avenue, well known for its outcrop of marble, and gave it to the city to add to the park. She also presents another 22 lots of land in December 1917. Then, in 1922, the Ishams sell off the last remaining portion of their estate to a developer. This will result in the line of buildings on Isham Street just south of the entrance to Isham Park.

At around this time, the city itself expands the park by purchasing land in 1925 and 1927. The idea of creating Inwood Hill Park has been revived, and the city purchases or condemns many acres of land in the area. At first, these were all added to Isham Park, but eventually, Isham Park was restored to approximately the boundaries of the Isham estates, and the remaining land aggregated into Inwood Hill Park.

The Isham house was part of the gift to the city, and for many years it was used for various civic-related activities, including a museum and a place for the Daughters of the American Revolution to meet. Due to the poor condition of the house, however, it and the greenhouse were demolished in the 1940s by Commissioner of Parks Robert Moses, although a large garden remained until at least 1912.

At some point in the 1930s a cement platform was placed in the park at the corner of Isham Street and Park Terrace. A World War I cannon was placed there, but in 1943 was removed to be melted down and reused in World War II. Children who played there were told it would be replaced after that war, but this has never been done and the platform has deteriorated and collapsed.

A plaque in the park provides some details on the way the park was assembled. It reads:

Isham Park
A Portion of the Country Seat
of William Bradley Isham and Julia Burnans Isham his Wife
Presented in their memory to the City of New York
By their daughter Julia Isham Taylor
June 15th 1911 and October 26th 1917
And enlarged by gifts from Flora E. Isham, sister of William Bradley Isham
March 21st 1912
and from the estate of Samuel Isham his son
April 19th 1915

The park celebrated its centennial on September 29, 2012.

== Annual events ==
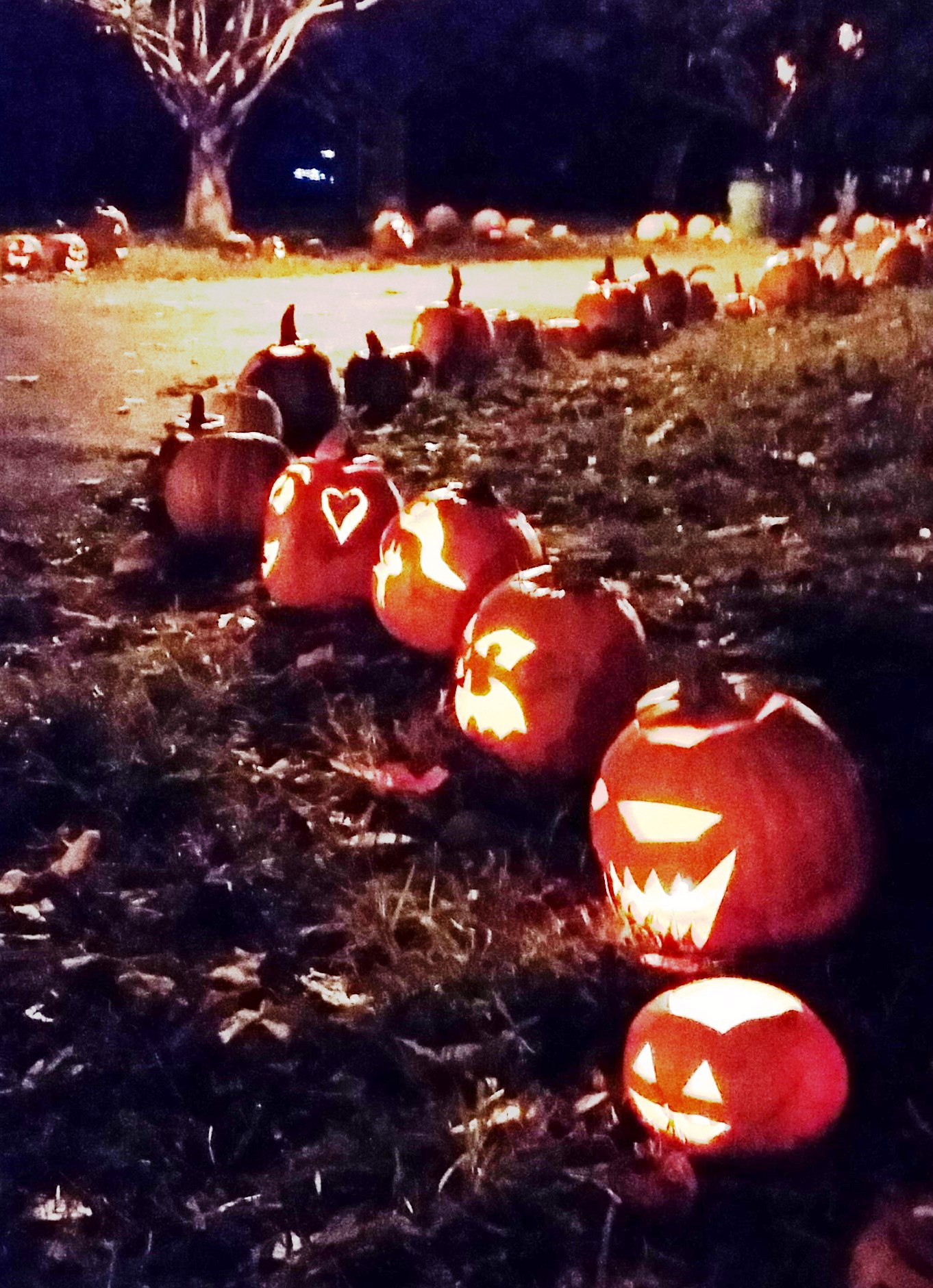
Annual Pumpkin Pageant in 2015

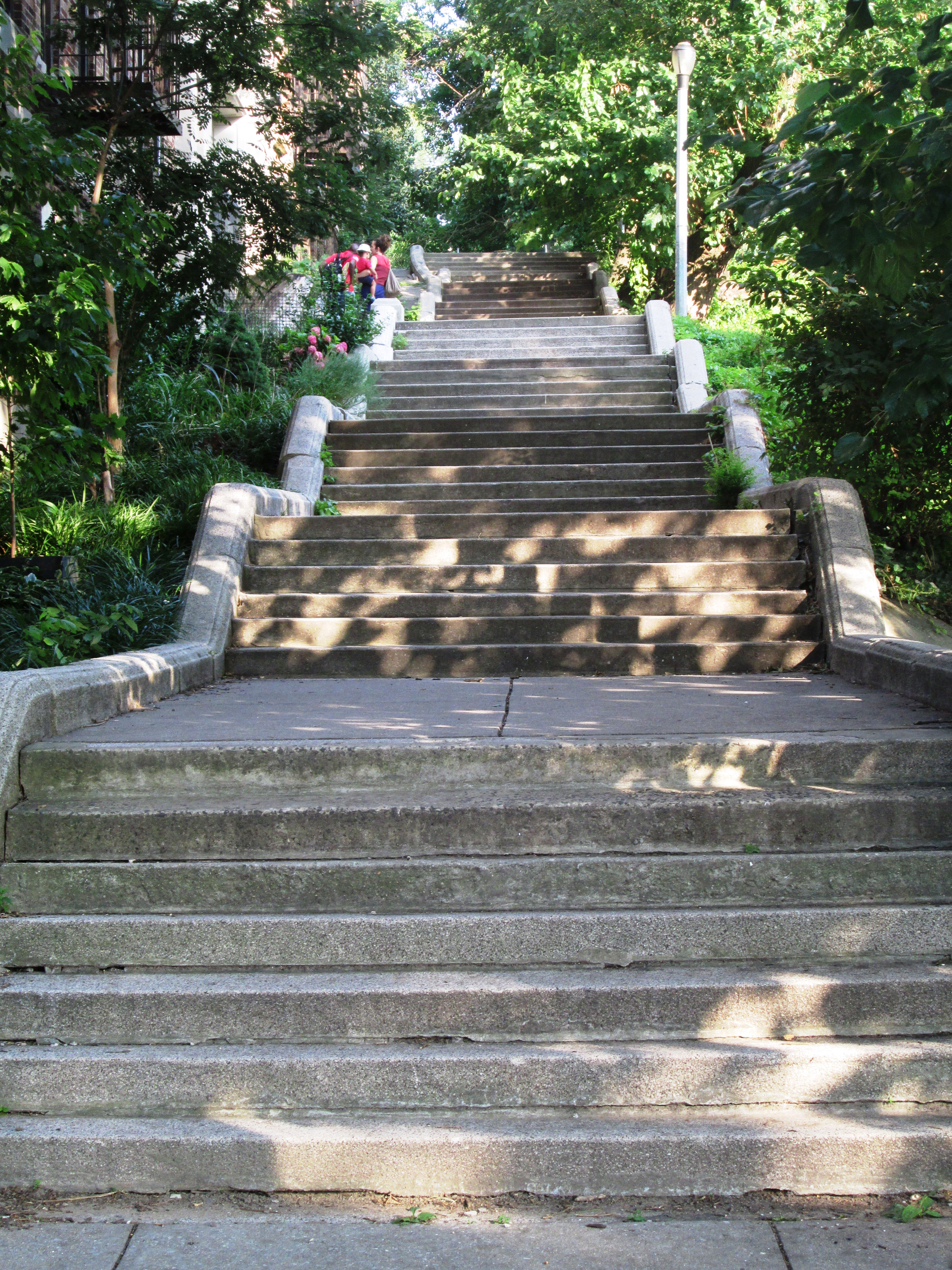
West 214th "Street"

Although the park lacks any fixed programming, as a neighborhood gathering place Isham Park hosts two family-friendly annual events organized by local residents - the Isham Park Egg Hunt" held each spring around Easter, and the "Inwood Pumpkin Pageant" displaying the community's Halloween jack-o-lanterns every November 1. Both events attract hundreds of local participants.

Many other seasonal events are held, including concerts, food co-ops, gardening events and regular events in nearby Bruce's Garden.

== Boundaries ==
The southeastern boundary of the park is Broadway – originally Kingsbridge Road – between one city-lot northeast of Isham Street and a complex of apartment buildings between where West 213th and 214th Streets would be.

The southwest boundary is the rear property line of the buildings on Isham Street between Broadway and Park Terrace West, and then Isham Street itself to Seaman Avenue.

The northwest boundary in practical terms is Seaman Avenue between Isham Street and West 214th Street. (An irregular parcel of land at the eastern edge of Inwood Hill Park remains legally zoned as Isham Park along Seaman Avenue, West 214th Street, and Indian Road; its remaining boundaries no longer correspond to any existing physical features.)

The northeast boundary is complex. It begins at West 214th Street between Seaman and Park Terrace West, except that 214th Street there is a set of stairs and not a street. In the next section, between Park Terrace West and Park Terrace west, the park's boundary is the rear property line of the buildings on the southwest side of West 215th Street. Finally, as stated above, between Park Terrace East and Broadway, the boundary is the property line of the apartment complex between where West 213th and 214th Streets would be.

== Gallery ==
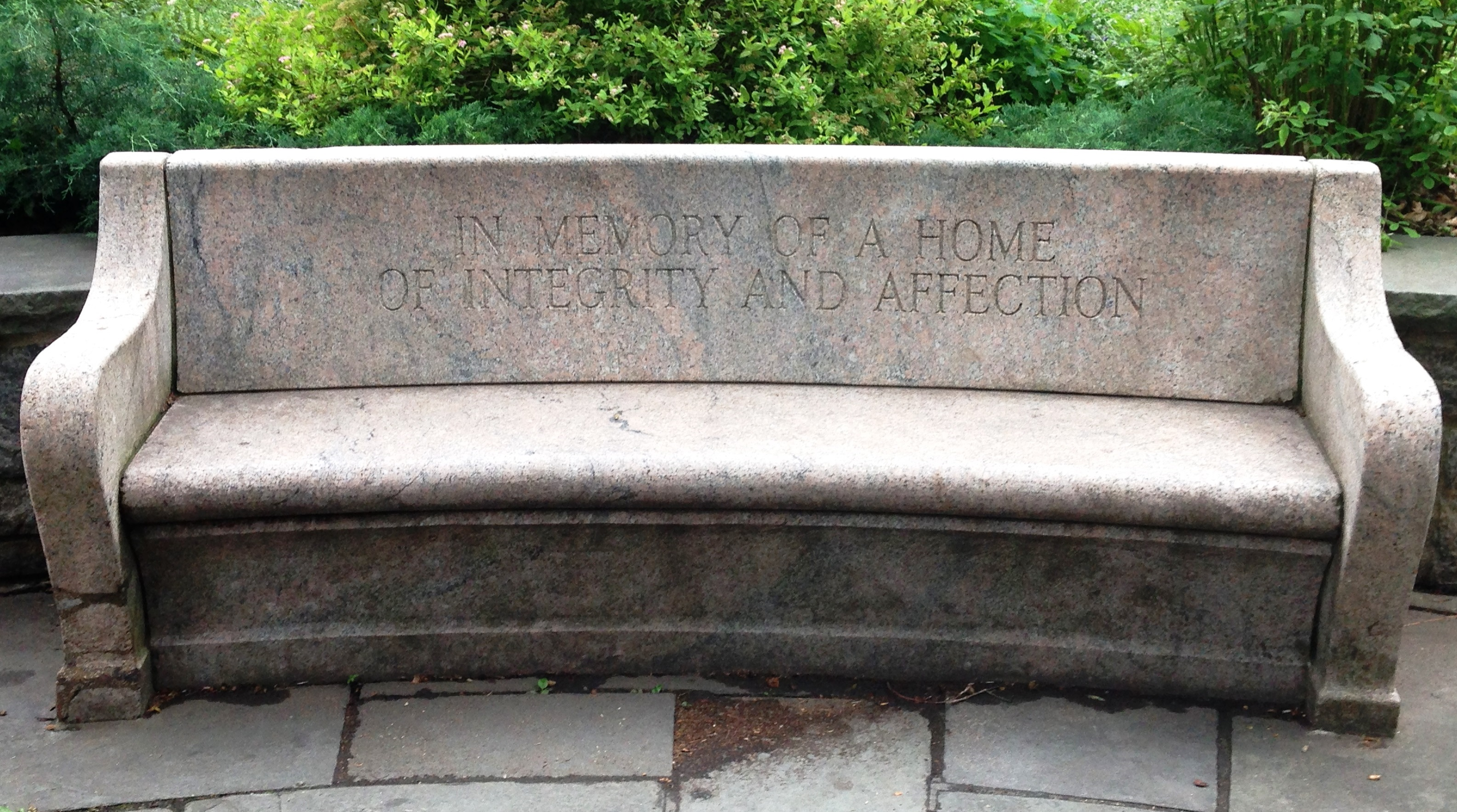
This bench is inscribed:
"In Memory Of A Home
Of Integrity and Affection"

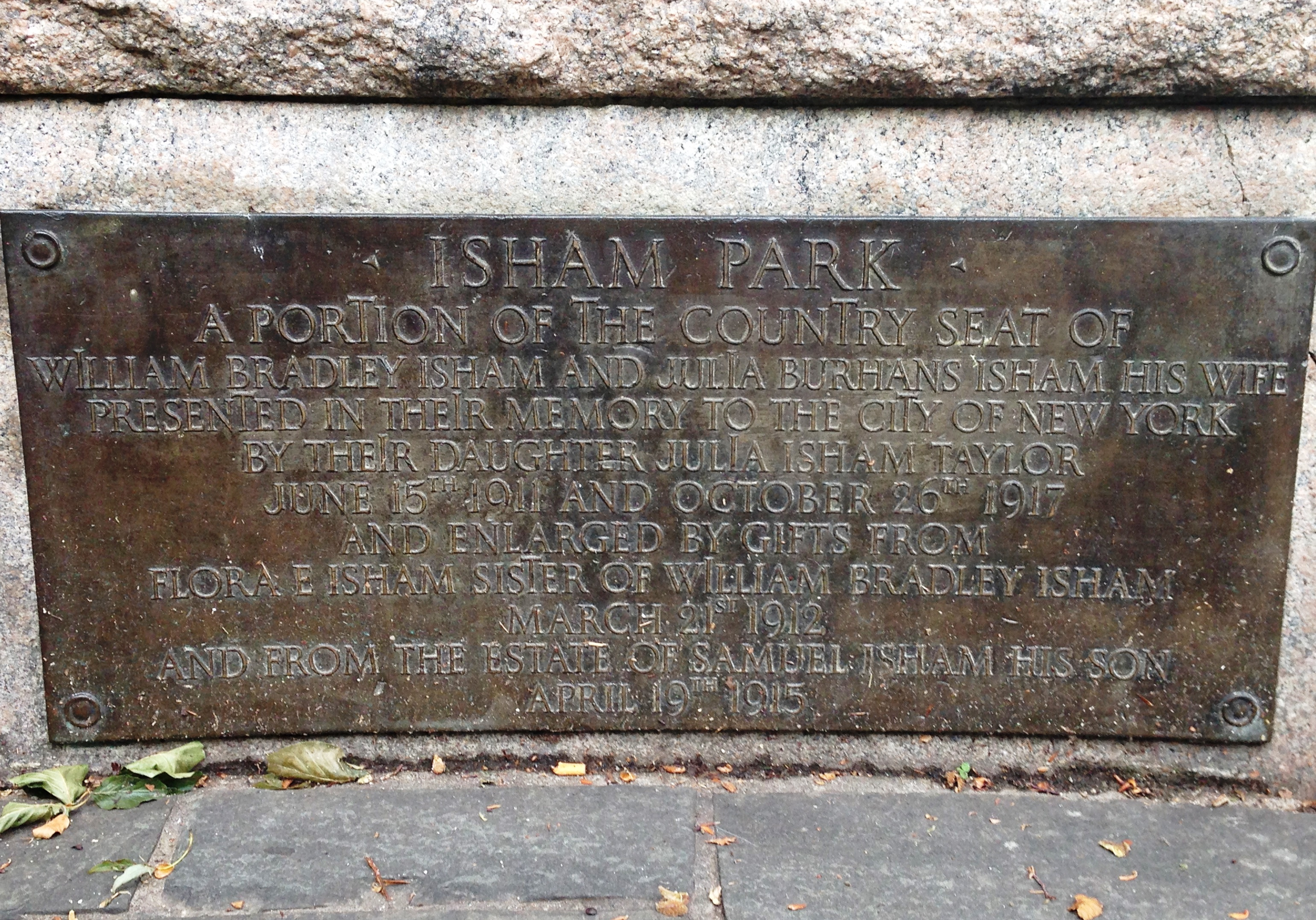
The plaque mentioned above is situated opposite from the two marble benches.

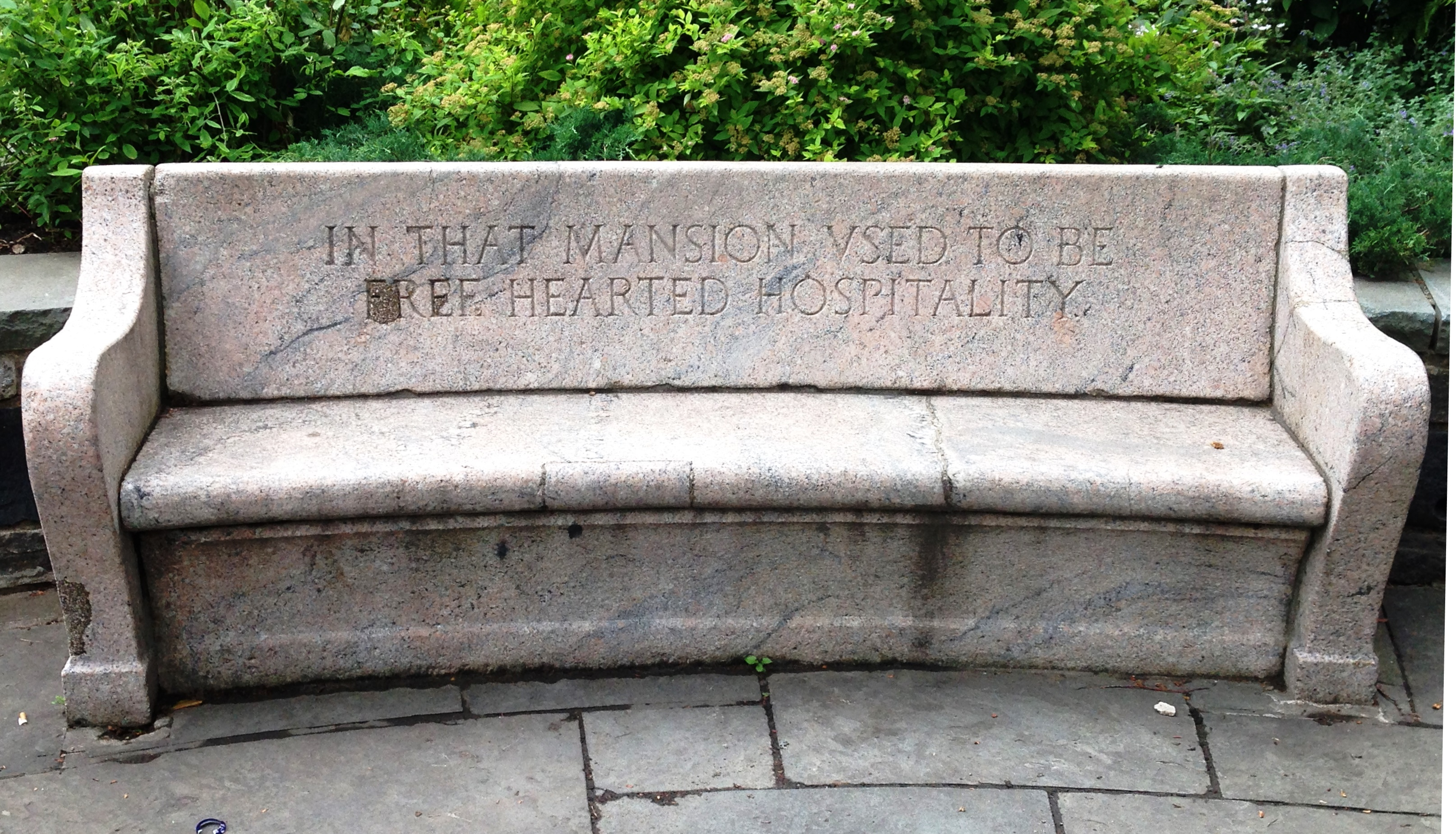
This bench is inscribed:
"In That Mansion Used To Be
Free Hearted Hospitality"

== See also ==
- New York City Parks Department
