= Franz J. Berlenbach Jr. =

American architect (1825–95)

Franz Joseph Berlenbach Jr. (1825 – 15 February 1895) was an American architect from New York City who specialized in designing Roman Catholic churches. He acted as a consultant for architectural designs for the Archdiocese of Brooklyn, New York and the Sisters of the Order of St. Dominic. He is also known simply as F.J. Berlenbach.

== Biography ==
Born in Milwaukee, Wisconsin, Berlenbach Jr. was the oldest son of his German immigrant father and builder/carpenter, Franz Joseph Berlenbach Sr., who was born in Pfalz, Germany. After living in Milwaukee, Wisconsin, the Berlenbach family moved to Williamsburgh, Brooklyn, New York in 1863. They settled in a house presently known as the "F. J. Berlenbach House" (or "the Berlenbach House"), which was erected in 1887 by Berlenbach Jr. and Berlenbach Sr. using the Queen-Anne style of design. They lived in this home until 1899. The house, located at 174 Meserole Street, Brooklyn, New York, was owned by Berlenbach Sr. The New York City Landmarks Preservation Commission designated this house a landmark on May 11, 2004.

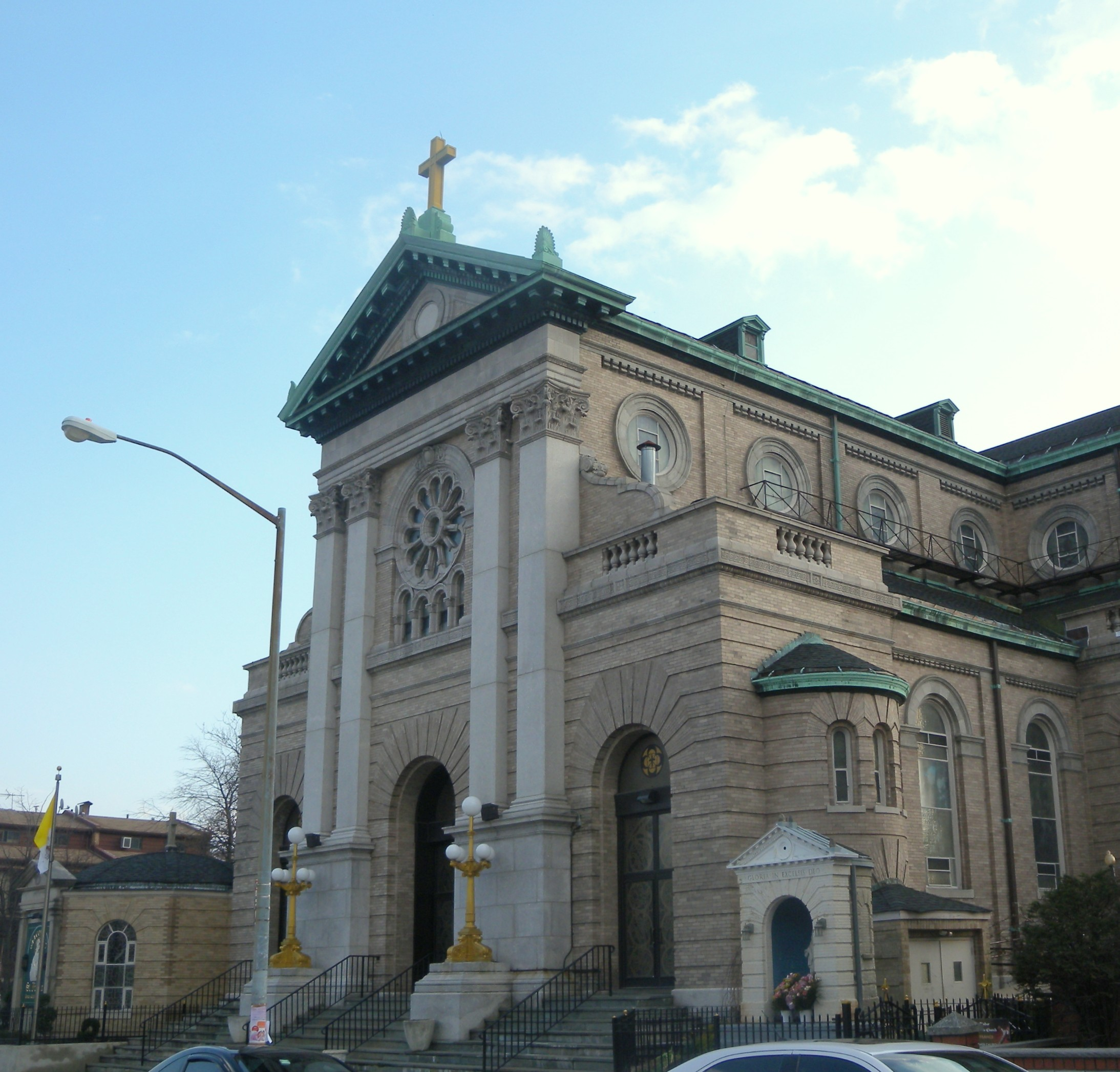
St Finbar's, Brooklyn

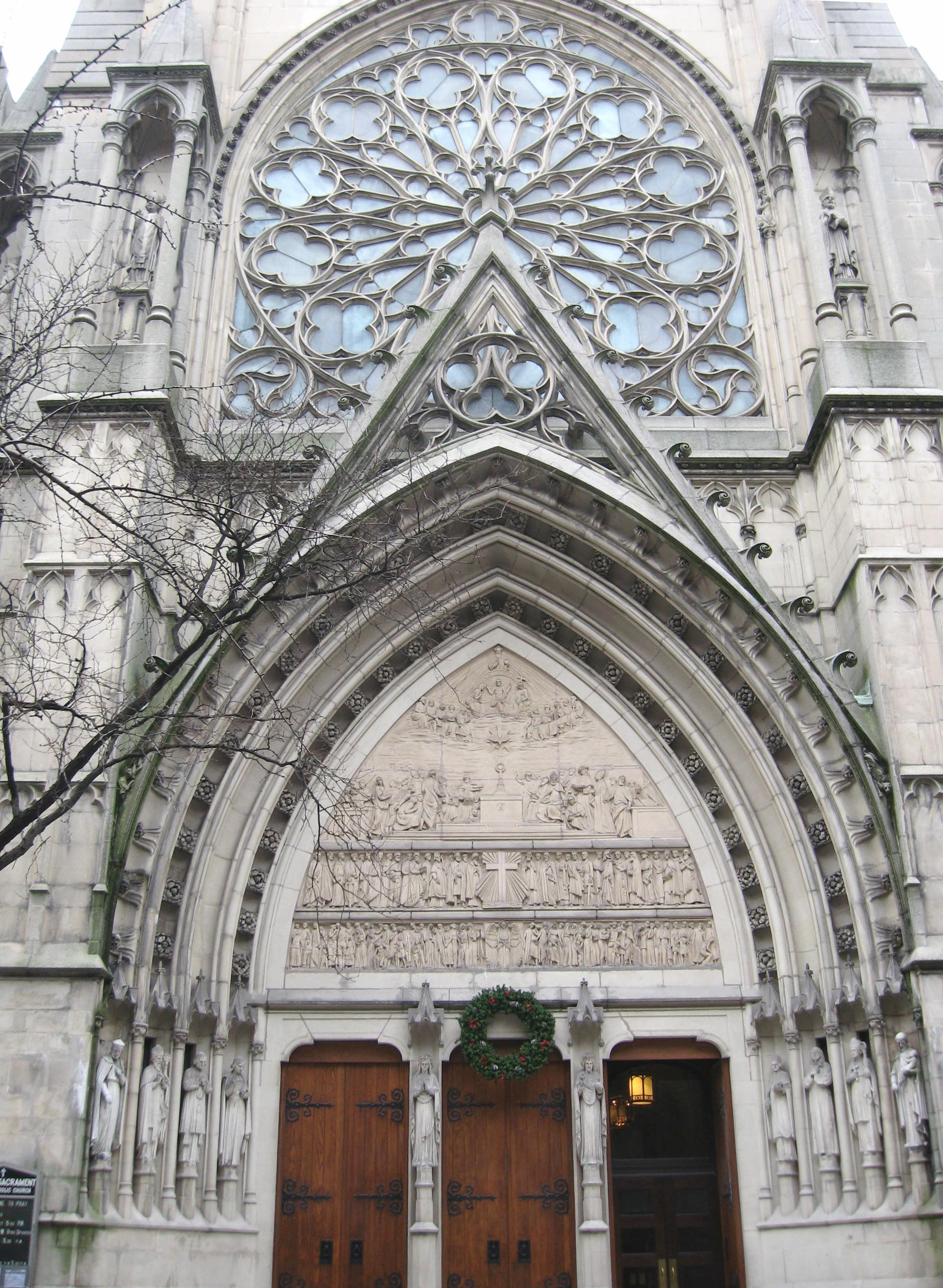
Blessed Sacrament Church

== Professional life ==
For a time, Berlenbach Jr. worked for the architectural designing firm of James Renwick Jr in 1880. He opened his own company in 1885, an office in 260 Graham Avenue. In partnership with father, Franz Joseph Berlenbach Sr., both engaged primarily in the building of tenements and small residential houses in Williamsburg, New York. Berlenbach Jr. became involved in designing Roman Catholic churches, specializing in the Romanesque style although also created designs influenced by Italian Renaissance later on. His architectural creations included St. Finbar Church, the Assumption Church, St. Joseph Church, the Blessed Sacrament Church, the St. Aloysius Roman Catholic Church, the St. Matthias Roman Catholic Parish, and the Parish Hall ("Institute") of Our Lady of Mount Carmel in Astoria NY (1909). For the Dominican congregation, Berlenbach Jr. accepted jobs from Convent of the Order of St. Dominic in 1889, the Annunciation School in 1892, the Convent of the Church of the Annunciation in 1889, and the St. Sebastian Roman Catholic Church during the mid-1890s. and Visitation Monastery, Bay Ridge Brooklyn, completed in 1913.
