= Carroll Park Methodist Episcopal Church =

Building in New York, United States

Coordinates: 40°40′46.87″N 73°59′35.05″W

Carroll Park Methodist Episcopal Church (Former); Norwegian Methodist Episcopal Church (Former); and South Brooklyn Christian Assembly Church (Former)
- Interactive map of the Carroll Park Methodist Episcopal Church (Former); Norwegian Methodist Episcopal Church (Former); and South Brooklyn Christian Assembly Church (Former) area

General information
- Architectural style: Victorian Gothic
- Location: Brooklyn, New York, United States of America
- Completed: 1890s
- Demolished: c.2000
- Client: Methodist Episcopal Church of the United States

Technical details
- Structural system: Masonry

Carroll Park Methodist Episcopal Church is a former Methodist church in Brooklyn, New York, formerly located at 295 Carroll Street, Carroll Gardens, Brooklyn, New York City. The Victorian Gothic edifice was erected c. 1890 and located within the Carroll Gardens historic district. It was reused as Norwegian Methodist Episcopal Church, reflecting the large Scandinavian population in Brooklyn between the 1890s and 1949. It was "sold in 1949 and reused as the South Brooklyn Christian Assembly Church but as of 1977, it was largely demolished and redeveloped into three townhouses with no evidence of the church remaining."
