= Quaker Meeting-house (Manhattan) =

Church in Manhattan, New York

Coordinates: 40.7175°N 73.9962°W

The (Former) Quaker Meeting-house
- Interactive map of the The (Former) Quaker Meeting-house area

General information
- Location: Hester and Elizabeth Streets, New York, New York, United States of America
- Completed: 1818
- Client: The Religious Society of Friends

Technical details
- Structural system: Masonry

The Quaker Meeting-house on Hester and Elizabeth Streets, on the Lower East Side of Manhattan, New York City, was a meetinghouse for the Religious Society of Friends, built in 1818. Recorded in 1876 by the New York Express that it "has for a long time been the office of the New York Gas Light Company", now Consolidated Edison. It was presumed demolished.
