= Jones Chapel (New York City) =

Chapel in Manhattan, New York

Coordinates: 40°45′45″N 73°57′20″W

- Interactive map of the Jones Chapel area

General information
- Architectural style: Greek Revival
- Location: New York, New York, United States of America
- Completed: c. 1830
- Demolished: Before 1900

Technical details
- Structural system: Timber

Jones Chapel was a church built around 1830, now demolished, that was located on East 64th Street in Manhattan, in New York City. The structure was a timber Greek Doric temple-style church with a prostyle tetra-style pedimented portico. The former site of the church became the campus of the Rockefeller Institute for Medical Research.
