= Mount Washington Church (New York City) =

Demolished church in Manhattan, New York

Coordinates: 40.8655°N 73.9271°W

Mount Washington Presbyterian Church was a former church located on Broadway and Dyckman Street in Inwood, Manhattan, New York City. It was built in 1844 and enlarged 1856. It was a fine example of a timber Carpenter Gothic church with crenellated tower and spire. The church was demolished sometime before its publication (1967) in Lost New York.
