= Bank of the Metropolis =

Residential building in Manhattan, New York

- U.S. National Register of Historic Places
- New York State Register of Historic Places
- New York City Landmark
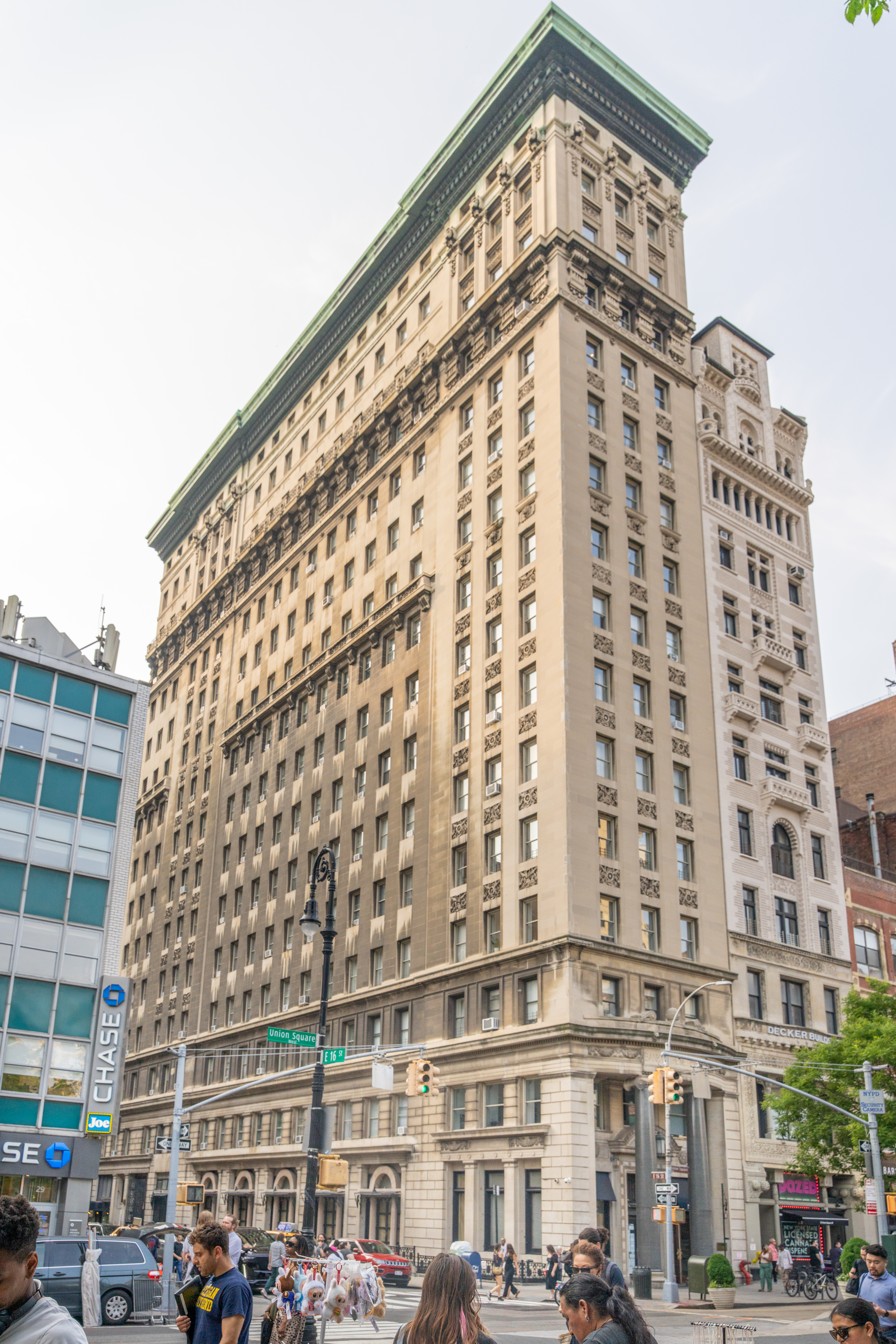
- (2025)

- Location within Manhattan Location within New York City Location within New York Location within the United States
- Interactive map of Bank of the Metropolis
- Location: 31 Union Square West; Manhattan, New York City
- Coordinates: 40°44′13″N 73°59′28″W
- Built: 1902
- Architect: Bruce Price
- Architectural style: Beaux-Arts
- NRHP reference No.: 03001153
- NYSRHP No.: 06101.013164
- NYCL No.: 1537

Significant dates
- Added to NRHP: November 15, 2003
- Designated NYSRHP: September 23, 2003
- Designated NYCL: July 12, 1988

The Bank of the Metropolis was a bank in New York City that operated between 1871 and 1918. The bank was originally located at several addresses around Union Square in Manhattan before finally moving to 31 Union Square West, a 16-story Renaissance Revival building designed by Bruce Price and built between 1902 and 1903.

The bank building uses a tripartite facade design and neoclassical elements. After the Bank of the Metropolis merged into the Bank of Manhattan in 1918, the building continued to be used as an office tower. The upper stories were converted for residential use in 1976, while the ground level was later used as a restaurant. The Bank of the Metropolis building was designated a city landmark by the New York City Landmarks Preservation Commission in 1988, and was added to the National Register of Historic Places in 2003.

== History ==
=== Bank establishment ===
Starting in the 1870s, the area surrounding Union Square Park became populated with hotels, theaters, and commercial enterprises. The Bank of the Metropolis was established on June 1, 1871, to serve the merchants around Union Square. The businessman William Steinway, of Steinway & Sons, was among the bank's founding board of directors.

The Bank of the Metropolis was initially located at 31 Union Square West, at the site of the present bank building. At the time, most businesses were located in Lower Manhattan. The 1893 King's Handbook to New York City described it as a "flourishing outgrowth of the movement of business" further uptown. The bank moved twice during the 19th century: to 17 Union Square West in 1877, and to 29 Union Square West in 1888. During the first decades of the bank's existence, The New York Times described three criminal incidents involving the bank. In 1879, a nighttime guard went to a saloon to drink, leaving the bank without any protection, though no burglaries were reported during that time. A man was caught depositing forged bonds at the bank during the early 1880s, and a thief was arrested in 1889 after robbing a client who had just made a withdrawal.

By the mid-1890s, the Bank of the Metropolis had $6 million in deposits. At the time, Union Square was being developed with such buildings as the Decker Building at 33 Union Square West, near the corner with 16th Street, and the Century Building at 33 East 17th Street, on the northern side of the park. By the beginning of the 20th century, the bank's board of directors included Louis Comfort Tiffany and businessman Charles Scribner II. The National City Bank acquired a major stake in the Bank of the Metropolis in 1900.

=== New building ===
The Bank of the Metropolis bought the plot at the corner of 16th Street and Union Square West. The plot had previously been occupied by a Brentano's bookstore, which moved elsewhere in 1901. The bank hired Bruce Price to design a 16-story building on the slim L-shaped lot. The land for the bank was adjacent to the Decker Building, directly to the north at 33 Union Square West, which had unsuccessfully attempted to sell the 32.5-foot-wide (9.9 m) corner lot that the new bank building was to occupy.

The bank started ordering stone for the new building in November 1901, and Price submitted his plans to the New York City Department of Buildings the next month. The structure was built by the George A. Fuller Company. During construction, the foundation of the Decker Building had to be underpinned because the foundation of that building was not located in solid rock. In August 1902, four construction workers were injured when one of the derricks broke. When the building was completed in 1903, it had cost $500,000 in total. Pitman's Journal of Commercial Education, one of the building's first tenants, praised the amenities and its proximity to the New York City Subway's 14th Street–Union Square station, which at the time was under construction.

=== Later use ===
The bank building was occupied by several office tenants, including architecture firm Jackson, Rosencrans & Caufield; architect Charles B. Meyers; the Employing Lithographers' Association; engineering firm W. L. Fleischer & Co.; and Jewish organizations. The Bank of the Metropolis was merged into the Bank of Manhattan in 1918, though the Union Square West building continued to be used as a banking location. Two years later, the building was sold to Dora Kuch for $2 million.

The building remained relatively unchanged until 1975, when developer David Teitelbaum was granted a zoning variance to turn the upper-floor offices into 145 residences. These plans temporarily stalled in 1976 because several banks did not want to finance the $3.3 million conversion project. By 1979, the residential conversion had been completed: most of the building was used as artists' lofts, while four floors were being used as dormitory space for the Parsons School of Design. In 1980 the former banking room at the ground floor became a club called Zippers, under the direction of Lynn Barclay. The space then became a restaurant named Metropolis in the mid-late 1980's. It was upscale but casual and attracted a young, hip crowd. Soon after the restaurant opened, the owners opened a small dance club in the basement. The restaurant changed hands in 1996 and was re-opened as the Blue Water Grill. The restaurant closed in 2019 due to rising rents.

== Architecture ==
The Bank of the Metropolis building is a Renaissance Revival structure with a facade made of limestone. Price was particularly attached to designing skyscrapers in three parts, mirroring the structure of classical columns, and the building reflects this base-shaft-capital concept. The tripartite design and the use of neoclassical elements are also present in Price's earlier buildings, including the American Surety Building (1896) and the demolished International Bank and Trust Company Building (1899).

=== Form ===
The Bank of the Metropolis building is located on a slim L-shaped plot. It has 32.5 feet (9.9 m) of frontage on Union Square West, to the east, and 175 feet (53 m) on 16th Street, to the south. At the western end of the 16th Street facade, the bank contains a 92-foot (28 m) deep wing. This wing runs adjacent to the four buildings at 33-39 Union Square West, and connects back to the Hartford Building at Broadway and 17th Street.

The 32.5-foot-wide section on Union Square West exists because the owner of the Decker Building could not sell the corner lot along 16th Street. The L-shaped form was also present in the International Bank and Trust Company Building.

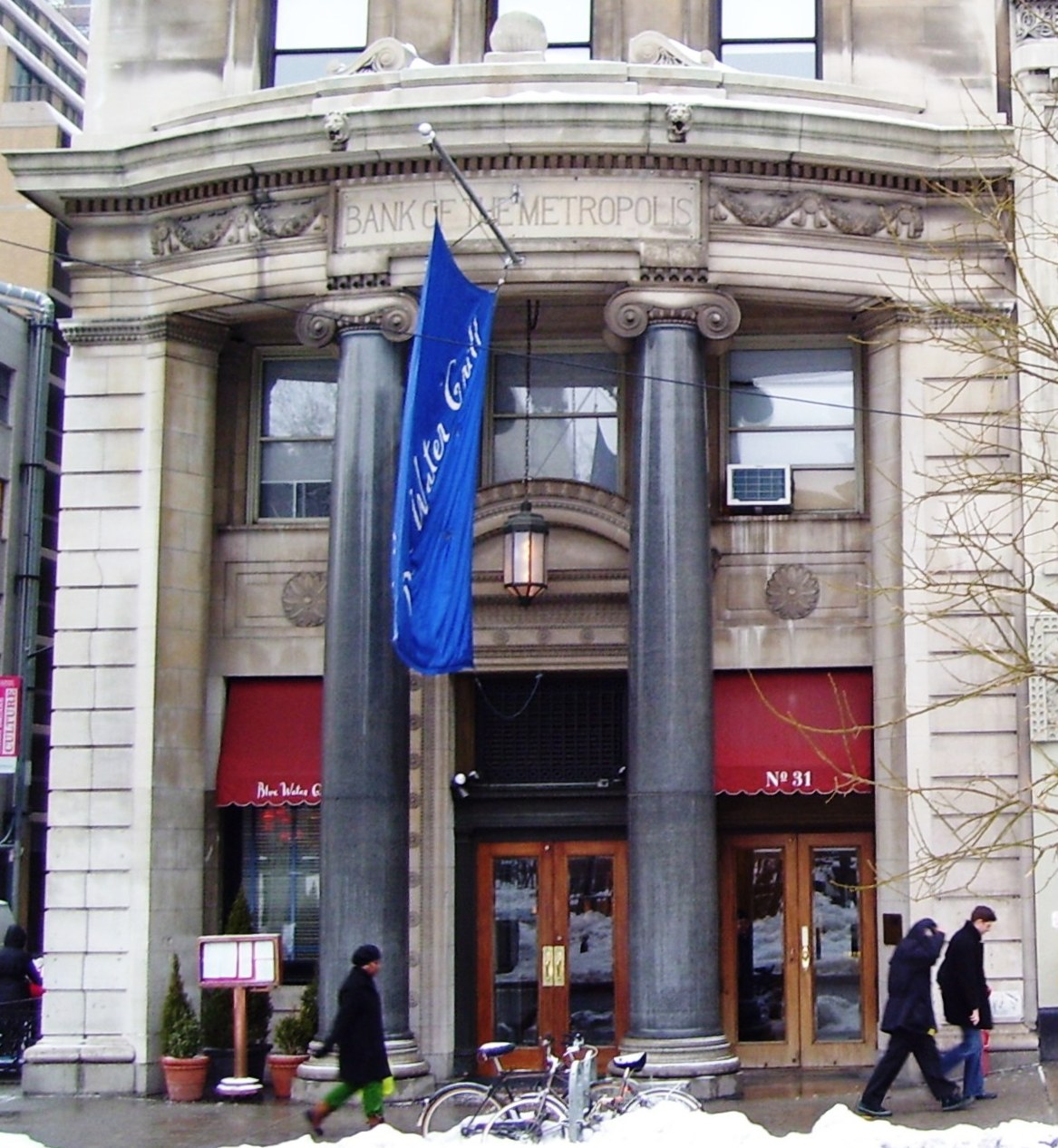
Union Square facade

The main entrance is on the narrow Union Square West facade, since Union Square was a coveted address at the time of the building's construction. The main entrance was designed to be symmetrical and emphasize the banking space on the ground floor, with a window to the left of the centrally-positioned banking entrance, and a door to the upper floors to the right. A journal article in 1916 said of prominent corner-lot bank locations that "the advantage [...] is generally appreciated", an observation that was made in the Landmarks Preservation Commission's report about the building.

=== Facade ===
The Bank of the Metropolis's facade is designed so that the building appears as a slab rising from the street. On the south and east facades, the 16-story building is broken up into three horizontal layers of articulation—a 2-story base with rusticated blocks, a 9-story tower, and a 3-story top section—with one "transition" story between each layer. The tripartite articulation serves a more aesthetic than functional purpose. The north and west facades consist of plain brick.

The eastern facade on Union Square West contains three vertical architectural bays. A curved, slightly projecting portico supported by two Ionic columns takes up the two base stories, and a carved plaque reading "Bank of the Metropolis" is located at the top of the portico. On either side of the portico are several rows of beveled masonry blocks. The southern facade on 16th Street contains 18 bays, split up into sections of 3, 3, 9, and 3 bays from west to east. At the ground level of the 16th Street facade, there are several wide, arched windows, which replaced the original square-framed windows there. These arched windows were installed after the ground level was converted into a restaurant.

On both the south and east facades, the third story contains square-framed windows and projecting courses at the top and bottom. The fourth through 12th stories make up the "tower" section of the bank building, and are relatively flat, except for spandrels between each floor, which are embellished with lions. The 13th floor contains scrolled corbels between each set of windows, a string course along the bottom, and belt courses along the top. There are vertical panels between each window on the 14th and 15th floors, and palmettes and lions' heads at the top of each panel. A copper cornice runs atop the 16th floor. Along both facades, there are various recessions in the facade where limestone balconies jut out. The most prominent is on the 9-bay section of the southern facade, which contains a balcony projecting from the 10th floor.

=== Interior ===
At the time of the building's opening in 1903, it included a steam heating system, electrically powered lights, mail chutes, telephone lines, and elevators.

The ground floor space, formerly the banking hall, was converted into a restaurant space, and is designed in the neoclassical style. The eastern one-fourth of the restaurant space is narrower than the rest. The north side wall is made of white marble on the bottom half and plaster on the top half. Architraves run across the coffered ceiling. A mezzanine is located above the westernmost portion of the restaurant space. The western part of the ground floor is separated from the restaurant by a partition. A marble-lined staircase close to the main entrance leads to a basement. To the north of the restaurant, on the eastern end is the office building lobby. A curving staircase leading upstairs is located at the west end of the lobby. Elevators are located within two arches of a three-arched arcade on the northern wall, while the lobby's southern wall is made of veined marble. The office building lobby is also coffered, but the coffers are smaller than in the restaurant space.

The upper floors, formerly office space, were converted into residential units. Almost none of the original architectural features remain, except for the staircase with its wooden railings.

== Critical review ==
Architectural writer Paul Goldberger called Price's design for the bank building "a lovely eclectic creation", praising its Ionic portico, narrow shaft, and "enormous, elaborate" cornice.

== See also ==
- National Register of Historic Places listings in Manhattan from 14th to 59th Streets
- List of New York City Designated Landmarks in Manhattan from 14th to 59th Streets
