= Mary Lincoln =

Mary Lincoln may refer to:

- Mary Lincoln Crume (1775–c. 1832), daughter of Abraham Lincoln (Captain) and Bathsheba Herring and aunt of American President Abraham Lincoln
- Mary Todd Lincoln (1818–1882), wife of American President Abraham Lincoln
- Mary Johnson Bailey Lincoln (1844–1921), American science teacher
- Mary Harlan Lincoln (1846–1937), daughter of James Harlan, wife of Robert T. Lincoln, daughter-in-law of Abraham Lincoln
- Mary "Mamie" Lincoln (1869–1938), granddaughter of Abraham Lincoln
- Mary Lincoln Beckwith (1898–1975), great-granddaughter of Abraham Lincoln
