= George Beckwith (Carl Jung associate) =

Carl Jung associate

George Beckwith (20 November 1896, in Mt. Pleasant, Iowa – 2 November 1931, in San Diego County, California) was an American expatriate in 1920s Paris and an early Jungian associate who accompanied psychologist Carl Jung on his African expedition (1925-6).

== Early life ==
George Beckwith was born in Mt. Pleasant, Iowa, the second child of Orville and Louisa Beckwith. His grandfather, Warren Beckwith (b. 1833) was a captain in the Union army during the Civil War and later supervised the construction of railways in eastern Iowa. He then founded a company producing horse-drawn road-grading equipment of his own design, used in the construction of railways. Initially established in Mt Pleasant, Western Wheeled Scraper Works soon moved to Aurora, Illinois and years later became part of Austin-Western Works. The family was comfortably wealthy. George Beckwith's cousins Robert Todd Lincoln Beckwith and Mary Lincoln Beckwith, children of Orville's brother Warren and Jessie Harlan Lincoln, were the last surviving descendants of Abraham Lincoln.

Orville Beckwith did not find success in his own business ventures. He committed suicide in 1920, and soon after that his wife and younger children moved to La Jolla, California. Beckwith attended Mt Pleasant High School, class of 1914. By 1920 he was working in Aurora, Illinois, where the family business was located. According to a newspaper article of 4 May 1922, he was then attending Columbia University.

== Paris years ==
In 1925, Leonard Bacon met Beckwith in Zurich. Beckwith was living in Paris, in analysis with Jung's apprentice H. G. "Peter" Baynes, and traveling frequently to Zurich to attend the seminars Jung held for patients and students. Bacon was an American poet who had come to Zurich for a few months to be analyzed by Jung. Bacon recalled Beckwith in his memoir:

A more delightful lunatic never walked a planet not distinguished for sanity. A more unhappy man never stepped habitually too hard on the gas, nor on the whole a more strictly honorable one. . . . He was I think the only man I ever knew who said whatever came into his head with complete effrontery and perfect impunity.

Another friend during these years was Dolly Wilde, niece of Oscar Wilde. According to Dolly, George resembled Carl Van Vechten's fictional character Peter Wiffle, an aspiring writer in a book based on Van Vechten's recollections of the English-speaking literary community in Paris.

== Involvement with Carl Jung ==
In the northern summer of 1925, inspired by the British Empire Exhibition display of African art and culture, Jung resolved to make a trip to East Africa as soon as possible. Jung hoped to find an area sufficiently remote that the inhabitants would have had no contact with European culture, and learn first-hand about the spiritual life of people untouched by the modern world. Initially, his traveling companions were to have been George Porter and Fowler McCormick, who had planned and financed Jung's trip to America the year before. When both dropped out of the project, Jung chose Baynes and Beckwith to replace them. Baynes took care of most of the details, including acquiring the support of the British Foreign Office for the project, under the name "Bugishu Psychological Expedition."

Jung and Beckwith left Southampton by ship on 15 October 1925, to be joined by Baynes (who had used land transportation) in Genoa. They disembarked in Mombasa and continued to Nairobi by rail, where they spent a week gathering supplies. Another day of rail travel took them to the end of the railroad, and they continued by car toward Jung's chosen destination at the foot of Mount Elgon.

An outsider's view of the three men appeared in a 1960 recollection by Francis Daniel Hislop, a retired British foreign officer who was then stationed in the Nandi District in Kenya. Jung, Beckwith and Baynes were driving a large safari-car without a local guide, had come to the end of the main road, and were trying to decide which of several unmaintained dirt roads they should take to reach Mount Elgon. Hislop was amazed by their naivete. Following his story is somewhat difficult because he did not remember the names of either Baynes or Beckwith, referring to Beckwith as "Douglas."

The tall man then said, "I am Dr. X [Baynes].. . .This is Dr. Jung." He indicated a burly man, middle-aged, with a reddish-brown country face. "And this is Mr. Douglas [actually Beckwith], our secretary, an American." Douglas was a young man, about 25, athletic looking and darkly handsome. He appeared bored by the proceedings and I do not recollect that he ever uttered a single word--perhaps the perfect secretary. On the other hand I noticed that they had no African servants with them and it occurred to me later that perhaps that explained young Douglas' gloom.

Shortly after their meeting with Hislop, they were joined by Ruth Bailey, who had been traveling with another group and received an invitation to join the Bugishu expedition. Her presence alleviated some of the tension which had developed between Peter Baynes and George Beckwith. Although Jung had never analyzed Beckwith, he was concerned by what he heard of Beckwith's dreams and apparently thought that the young man was at risk for an early death. This suspicion, along with an ominous message Jung had received in an "I Ching" reading shortly before they left, predisposed Jung to anxieties which only increased as the group traveled farther into the interior. Jung later related the events of a day when everything seemed to reach the crisis point. Jung had almost stepped on a puff-adder, then a pack of hyenas had attacked the camp. Beckwith experienced a particularly close encounter:

In the afternoon my companion returned from a hunt, deathly pale and trembling in every limb. He had almost been bitten by a seven-foot mamba which darted at his back from a termite hill. Without a doubt he would have been killed had he not been able at the last moment to wound the animal with a shot. . . On the evening of the day when my friend had had such a narrow escape out hunting, I could not help saying to him as we white men say looking at one another: "It seems as if the trouble had begun still farther back. Do you remember the dream you told me in Zurich just before we left?" At that time he had had a very impressive nightmare. He dreamed that he was hunting in Africa, and was suddenly attacked by a huge mamba, so that he woke up with a cry of terror. The dream had greatly disturbed him, and he now confessed to the thought that it had portended the death of one of us. He had of course assumed that I was to die, because we always hope that it is the "other fellow." But it was he who later fell ill of a severe malarial fever that brought him to the edge of the grave.

The malaria attack occurred near the end of the trip, in Cairo. Beckwith was fortunate that Ruth Bailey had nursing experience, and the illness did not delay his return voyage.

== Later years ==
It took months for Beckwith to recover completely. He remained in Paris for several more years, returning to the United States in the summer of 1931. He was killed in an auto accident that November, near the family home in La Jolla, California. Dolly Wilde said to a friend:

Don't grieve, darling, because he surely loved it. Think of how nice to die in what you like best, and you know what Beckwith liked best was cars and the sun. He adored driving fast in a beautiful car with the sun in his eyes. He must have felt like Apollo driving the sun itself, when his golden chariot fell over. (You know Beckwith had a new and specially shining yellow car). Imagine the flames going up in the sun, and Beckwith going up in the flames he sprang out from. It's a hero's death in antiquity.

The official report of his death did not mention flames, only that the accident was the result of a tire blow-out on a downhill grade, and that the cause of death was pulmonary hemorrhage. He was 35. Burial was at Forest Lawn Cemetery, Glendale.
