= Laird-Dunlop House =

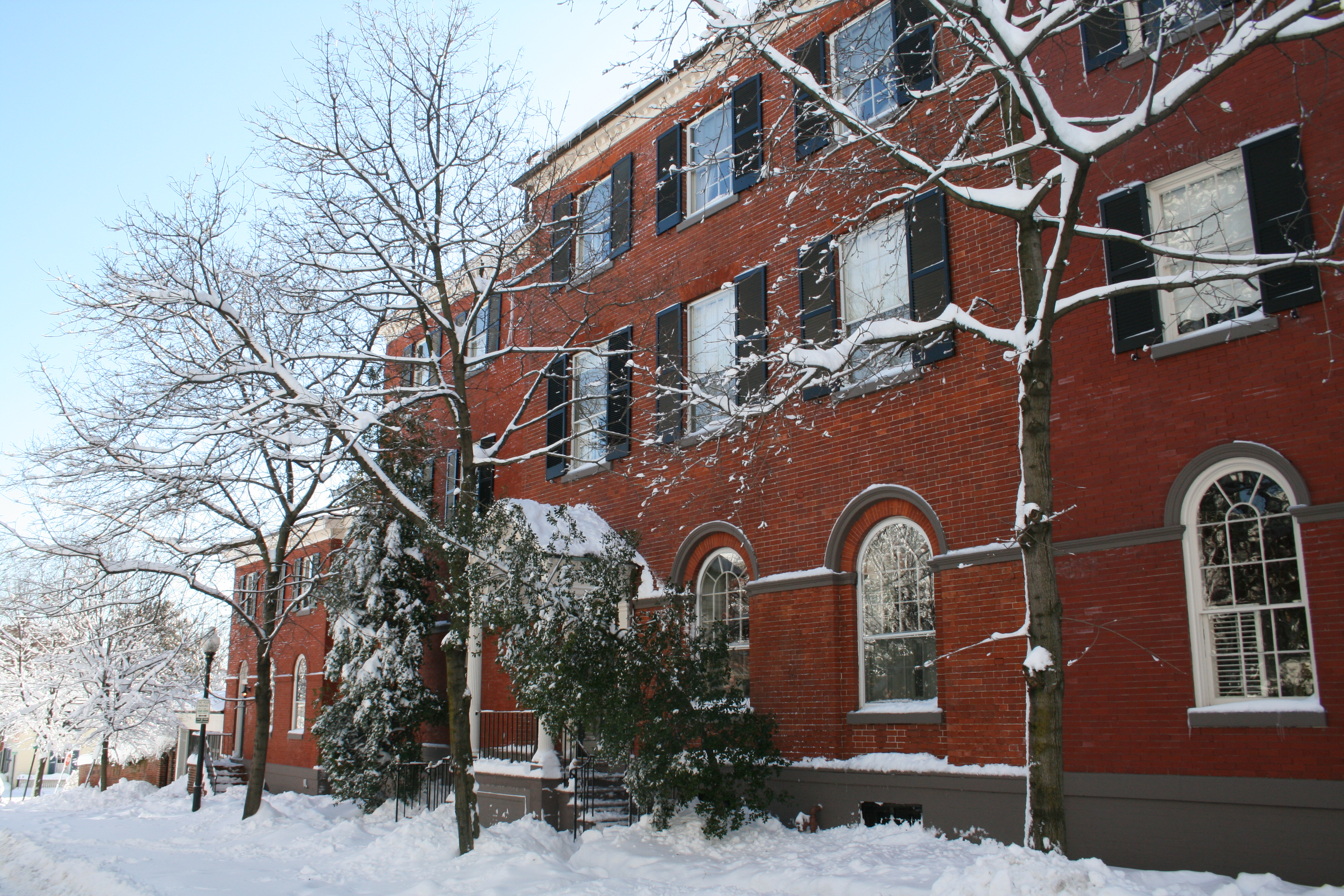

- Location within the United States

General information
- Location: Georgetown, Washington, DC
- Coordinates: 38.9066°N 77.0594°W
- Completed: 1792
- Owner: Benjamin C. Bradlee, Fmr. Editor-in-chief of the Washington Post; Sally Quinn of the Washington Post

Other information
- Number of rooms: 24

The Laird-Dunlop House is a historic mansion in the Georgetown section of Washington, D.C. The house stands at 3014 N Street N.W.

== Design ==
The house was designed by William Lovering, who, "though a self-trained amateur designer, was a prodigiously talented one." The house is tripartite, with a central block set between eastern and western wings. As it stands today, the house is Colonial Revival in design, with red brick, arched windows on the first floor and a course or line of horizontal brownstone breaking up the facade. Arches such as those seen on this house are characteristic of most of Lovering's work in Washington, D.C. Construction began in 1792 until 1793 and two wings were later added on to it. It is now a 24-room mansion.

== History ==
=== Original owner ===
The central block of the house, or some section thereof, was originally built in 1790 by one of Georgetown's richest men, John Laird, the owner of a tobacco warehouse. It was inherited by his daughter Barbara and her husband, Judge James Dunlop.

=== Robert Todd Lincoln ===
The house was purchased in 1918 by Robert Todd Lincoln, the son of President Abraham Lincoln. He spent time between this home in Georgetown and his estate Hildene in Manchester, Vermont, until his death at Hildene on July 26, 1926. His wife, Mary Harlan Lincoln, continued to live in both homes until her death in Washington, D.C., in 1937.

=== Benjamin C. Bradlee ===
Benjamin C. Bradlee, the Washington Post editor during the Watergate era, purchased the house in 1983 and lived there with Sally Quinn until his death there at age 93 on October 21, 2014.
