= Lincoln family =

Ancestors and descendants of Abraham Lincoln

Lincoln
- Current region: Hingham, Massachusetts (1st generation); Springfield, Illinois (7th generation); Fayette County, Pennsylvania and Arkansas (modern era)
- Etymology: Lincoln derives from the Welsh element lynn, meaning "lake or pool" and the Latin element colonia, meaning "colony".
- Origin: Hingham, Norfolk, England
- Founded: Arrival in the U.S.: 1637; 389 years ago
- Founder: Samuel Lincoln (1622–1690)
- Estates: Levi Lincoln house Mordecai Lincoln House; Lincoln Home; Mary Todd Lincoln House; Harlan–Lincoln House

The Lincoln family is an American family of English origins. It includes the fourth United States attorney general, Levi Lincoln Sr., governors Levi Lincoln Jr. (of Massachusetts) and Enoch Lincoln (of Maine), and Abraham Lincoln, the sixteenth president of the United States.

There were ten known descendants of Abraham Lincoln. The president's branch of the family is believed to have been extinct since its last undisputed, legal and known descendant, Robert Todd Lincoln Beckwith, died on December 24, 1985, without any acknowledged children. (Note: Robert's second wife had a son, named Timothy Lincoln Beckwith, and listed Robert as the father, which would make Timothy Abraham Lincoln's great-great-grandson and only living descendant. Robert, who had undergone a vasectomy years earlier, denied paternity of the child, and a divorce court ruled that Robert was not the father.)

== Roots in England ==
Samuel Lincoln's father, Edward Lincoln, was born around 1575 and remained in Hingham, Norfolk, England. He died on February 11, 1640.

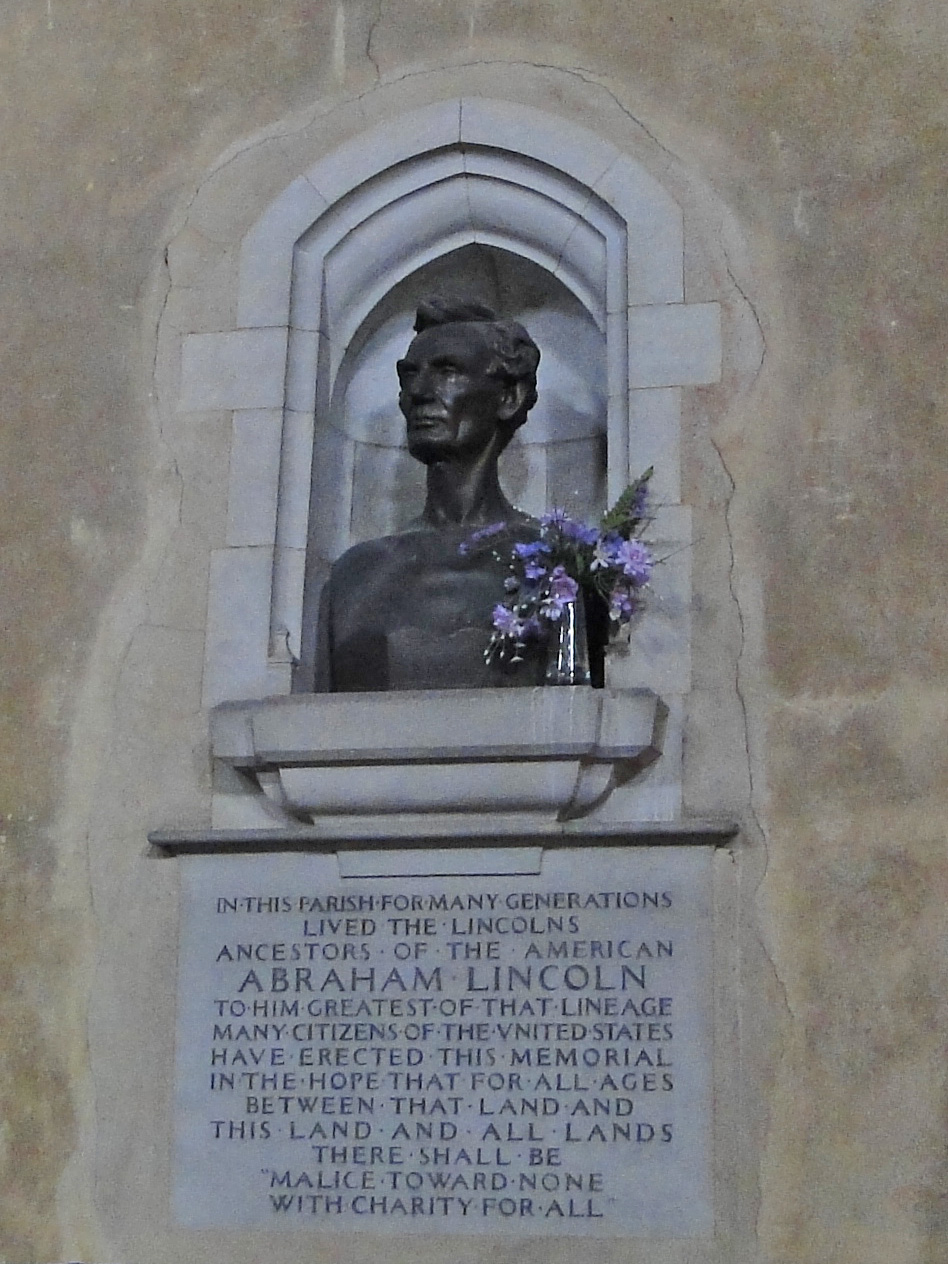
Memorial dedicated to Lincoln's ancestors in St Andrew's Church, Hingham

Edward was the only son of Richard Lincoln (buried 1620 in the graveyard of St Andrew's Church) and Elizabeth Remching. After the death of his wife, Richard married three more times. There is some debate – and at the time, some contesting discussions – relating to the contents of Richard's will. Richard was left an inheritance from his father, Robert II (d. 1555/1556), who in turn had it left from his father, Robert (d. 1543). By convention, his son Edward would inherit the lands and holdings in Hingham, Norfolk, but Richard's 4th wife had instead convinced him to leave the entire proceeds of the will to her and his three youngest children. With no reason to stay, Edward's children, including Thomas 'the weaver' Lincoln and Samuel Lincoln of Hingham, Norfolk, England, made the perilous journey to the New World.

== History in America ==
=== First generation ===
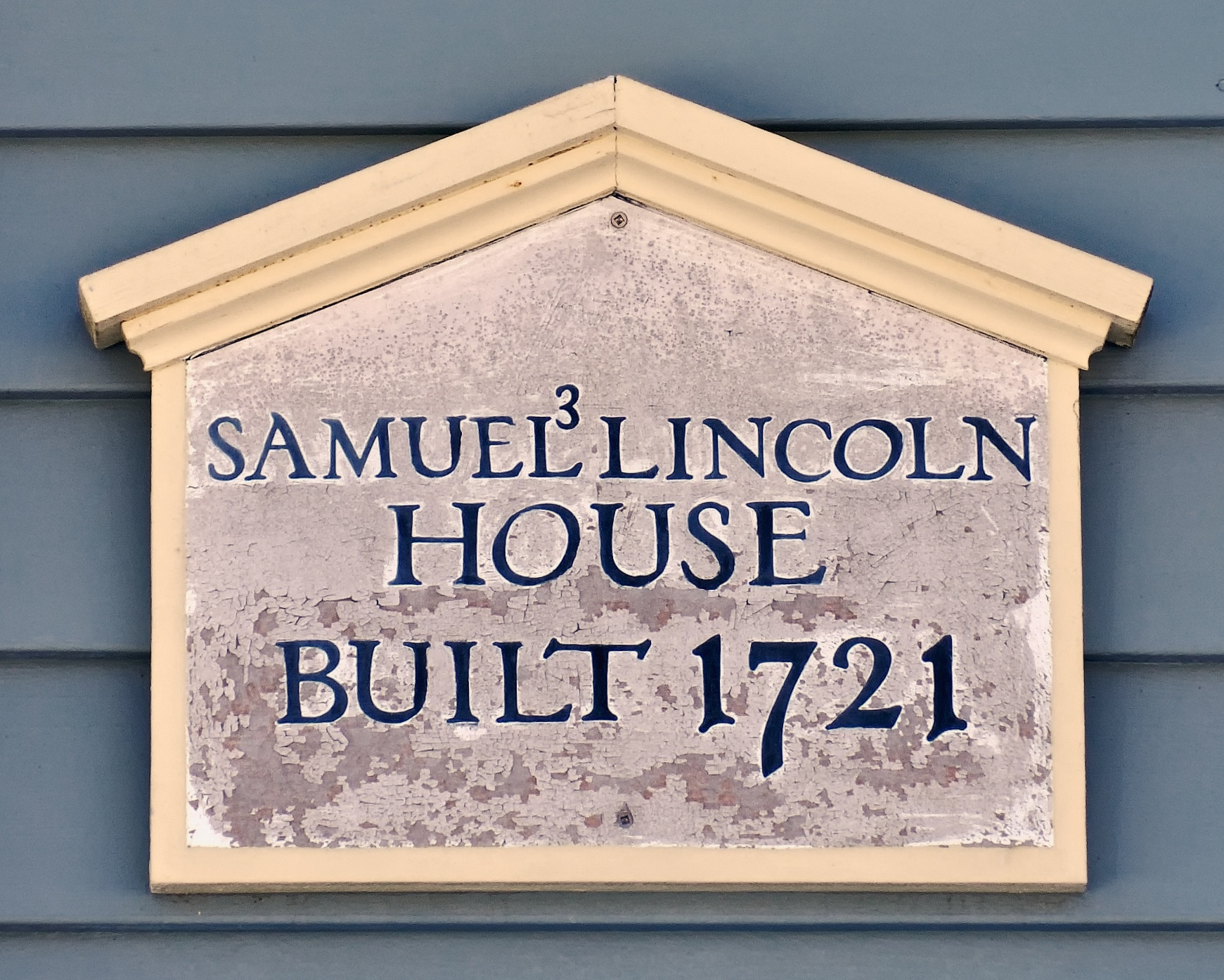
Samuel Lincoln House, built in Hingham, Massachusetts, by his grandson on land Samuel purchased in 1649

The Lincoln family arrived at the Massachusetts Bay Colony in 1637, when Samuel Lincoln (1622–1690), the son of Edward Lincoln, sailed on the ship John & Dorothy from Great Yarmouth. He is considered the patriarch of the Lincoln family in the United States.

=== Other Lincolns ===
Benjamin Lincoln (1733–1810) was a Continental Army general during the American Revolutionary War, though he is not known to have direct familial links to president Lincoln. His English ancestors were some who first settled in Hingham, beginning with Thomas Lincoln 'the cooper', who was among several Lincolns that settled in Hingham when it was part of the Massachusetts Bay Colony. He subsequently served as the first United States secretary of war and the second lieutenant governor of Massachusetts.

=== Seventh generation ===
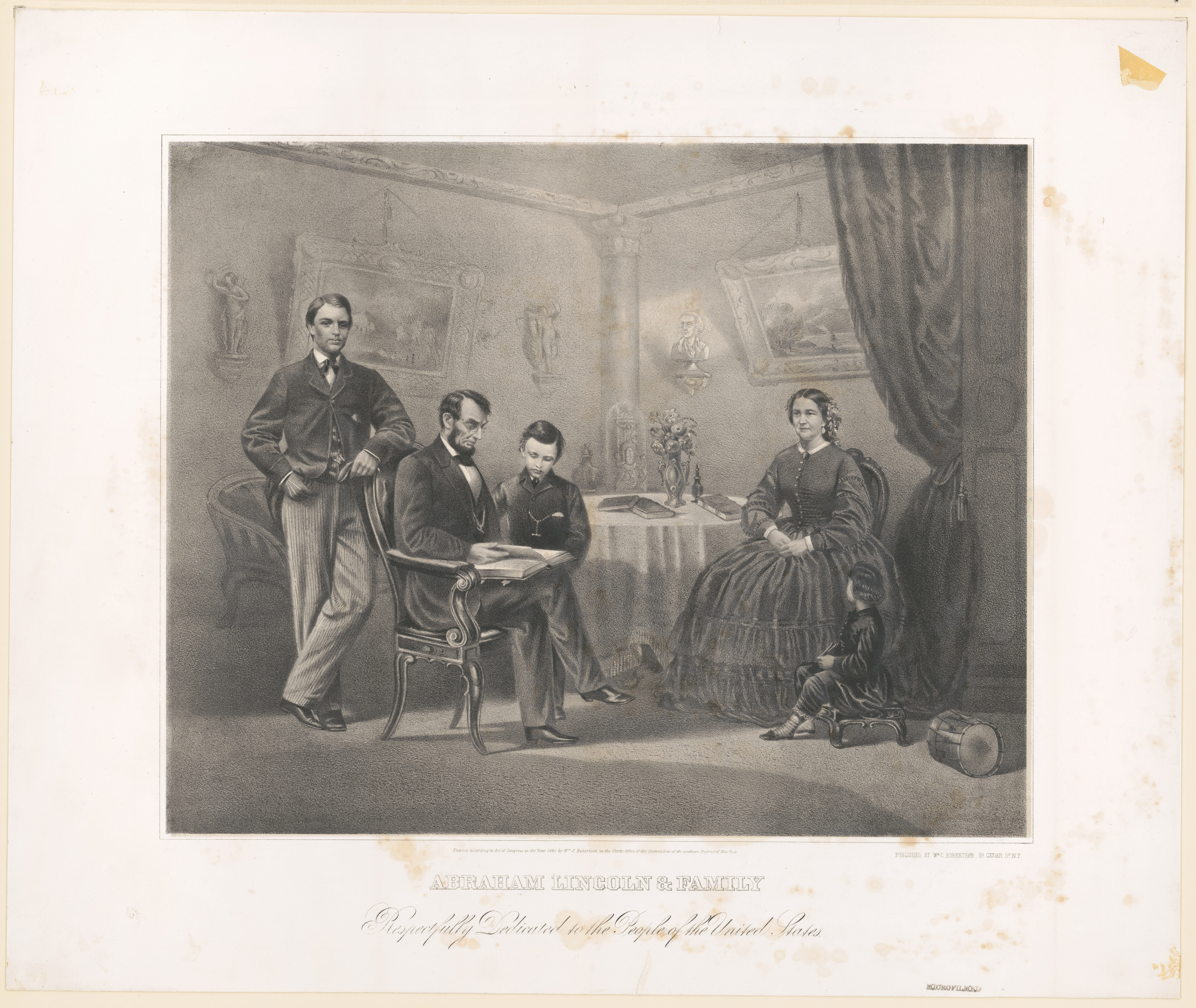
Lincoln and family

Abraham Lincoln (1809–1865) was a lawyer, politician and the 16th president of the United States from 1861 to 1865. He was born in a one-room log cabin on Sinking Spring Farm near Hodgenville, Kentucky, to Thomas Lincoln and Nancy Hanks, and was a brother to Thomas Lincoln Jr. and Sarah Lincoln Grigsby. He married Mary Ann Todd and had four children: Robert, Edward, Willie, and Tad.

=== Eighth generation ===
Of Lincoln's four sons, only Robert Todd survived past the age of 18. He married Mary Eunice Harlan (1846–1937), daughter of Senator James Harlan and Ann Eliza Peck of Mount Pleasant, Iowa. They had three children, two daughters and one son:

- Mary "Mamie" Lincoln (1869–1938)
- Abraham Lincoln II (nicknamed "Jack"; 1873–1890)
- Jessie Harlan Lincoln (1875–1948)

=== Ninth generation ===
Mary "Mamie" Lincoln married Charles Bradford Isham and had one son, Lincoln Isham (1892–1971).

Jessie Harlan Lincoln married three times. She had a daughter and a son, both with her first husband, Warren Wallace Beckwith:

- Mary Lincoln Beckwith (1898–1975)
- Robert Todd Lincoln Beckwith (1904–1985)

=== Tenth generation ===
Lincoln Isham married Leahalma Correa. They did not have any children.

Robert Todd Lincoln Beckwith (1904–1985) was a gentleman farmer and great-grandson of Abraham Lincoln. He became the last undisputed descendant of Abraham Lincoln when his sister, Mary, died in 1975, having no children.

=== Other distant relations ===
Former U.S. senator Blanche Lincoln (née Lambert) of Arkansas is married to Steve Lincoln, a distant relative of Abraham Lincoln. Actor George Clooney is a "half-first cousin five times removed from Lincoln", with Lincoln's mother being half-sisters with Clooney's 4th great-grandmother. Actor Tom Hanks and the former president are third cousins four times removed.

== Family tree and lineage ==
This table sets out the ancestors and descendants of President Abraham Lincoln for ten generations.

Lincoln family tree (open at right)

Samuel; Lincoln (1622–1690)	Martha; Lyford (1623–1693)
Mordecai; Lincoln (1657–1727)	Sarah; Jones (1660–1702)
Mordecai; Lincoln (1686–1736)	Hannah; Salter (1692–1727)
John; Lincoln (1716–1788)	Rebecca; Flowers (1720–1806)
Abraham; Lincoln (1744–1786)	Bathsheba; Herring (1750–1836)
Mordecai; Lincoln (1771–1830)	Thomas; Lincoln (1778–1851)	Nancy; Hanks (1784–1818)	Mary; Lincoln Crume (1775–c.1832)
Abraham Lincoln (1809–1865)	Mary Todd; Lincoln (1818–1882)	Sarah Lincoln; Grigsby (1807–1828)	Aaron; Grigsby (1801–1831)	Thomas; Lincoln Jr. (1812–1812)
Robert Todd; Lincoln (1843–1926)	Mary Eunice; Harlan (1846–1937)	Edward Baker; Lincoln (1846–1850)	William Wallace; Lincoln (1850–1862)	Thomas "Tad"; Lincoln III (1853–1871)
Mary "Mamie"; Lincoln (1869–1938)	Charles Bradford; Isham (1853–1919)	Abraham; Lincoln II (1873–1890)	Jessie Harlan; Lincoln (1875–1948)	Warren Wallace; Beckwith (1874–1955)
Lincoln; Isham (1892–1971)	Leahalma "Lea"; Correa (1892–1960)	Mary Lincoln; Beckwith (1898–1975)	Robert Todd Lincoln; Beckwith (1904–1985)	Anna Marie; Hoffman
