= Madame Talvande's Ladies Boarding School =

School in Charleston, South Carolina

Madame Talvande's Ladies Boarding School was a school that operated in Charleston, South Carolina, United States, from approximately 1816 to 1850. This was a school for the daughters of elite families. Its curriculum was French-based, focusing on the arts, music, dance, rhetoric, and sciences.

The building itself has had a long history, first being a boarding school, then becoming private property owned by many people after the school closed, and is believed to be haunted by Madame Talvande herself.

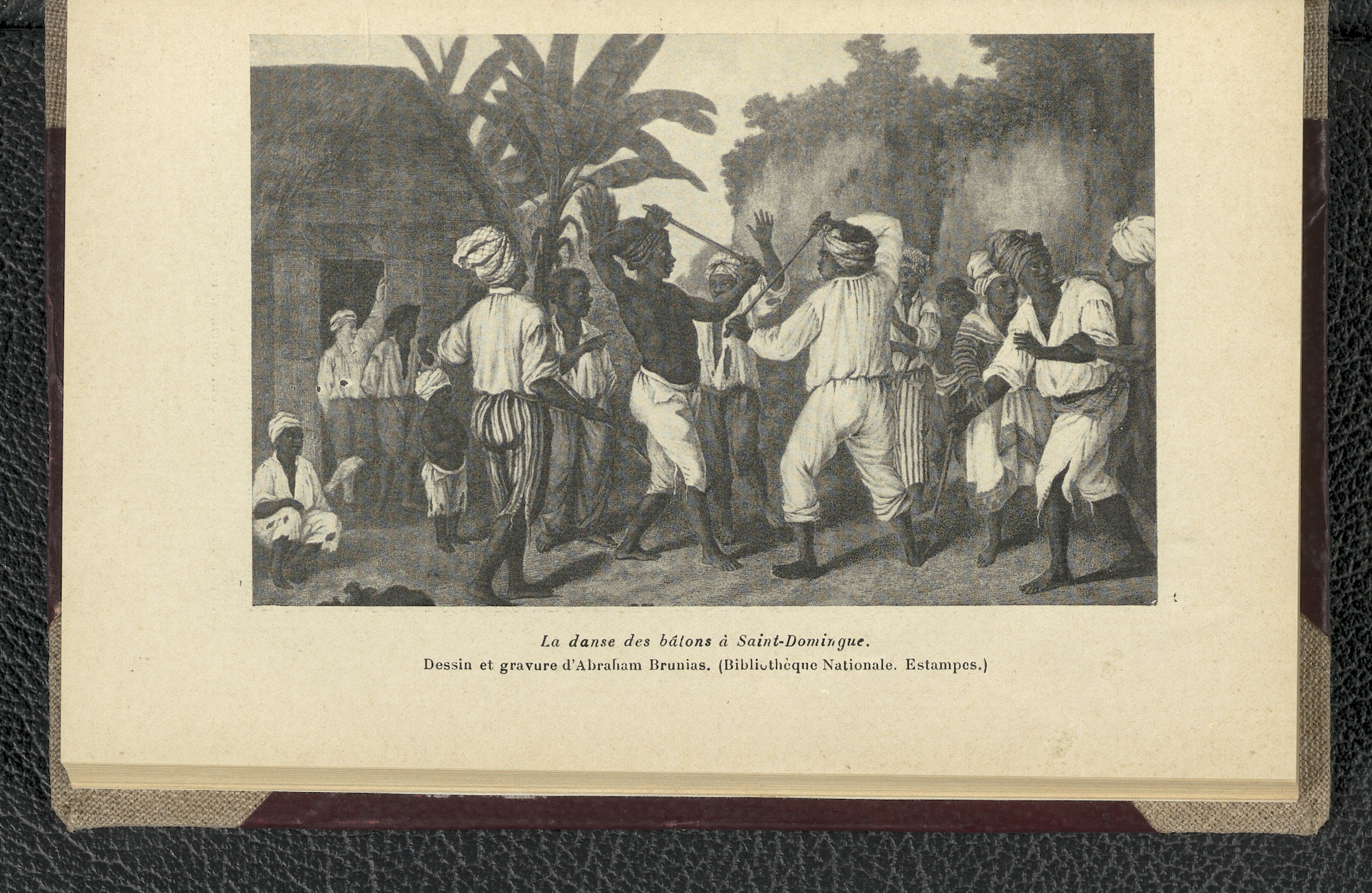
The Saint Domingue Revolution (1791–1804), now commonly known as the Haitian Revolution

== Owner ==
The school was opened by Madame Ann Marsan Talvande after she relocated with her husband, Andrew Talvande, to Charleston from Saint-Domingue because of the Haitian Revolution. She wanted to open an exclusive school for aristocratic families and build a reputation for giving girls the best education. There is no known inequity in the program's elite status other than the school being rather expensive because of its curriculum and the institution itself being private.

Not much is known about Madame Ann Marsan Talvande other than what has been recorded by her students, mainly Mary Boykin Chestnut.

== Notable Alumna ==
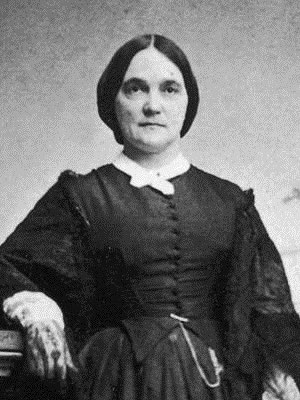
Mary Boykin Chestnut, the most notable alumna

A notable alumna from the boarding school is Mary Boykin Chesnut, an author from Stateburg. Boykin's family had wealth from the plantation they established and her father served in the House of Representatives, Senate, and as Governor of South Carolina. Boykin's diary is considered a critical piece of South Carolina's history, as it gave a personal but factual account of the Civil War on the Southern Front. This diary, named A Diary from Dixie, was from the point of view of a wife witnessing her husband fighting in the war at the time. Her husband was James Chesnut Jr., a lawyer, senator, and President Jefferson's aide and brigadier during the Civil War.

== Scandal ==
Maria Whaley, a student at the boarding school, fell in love with George Morris, a young bachelor from New York. Madame Talvande was known for being very watchful over her students, mainly for their safety. But Maria and George were in love and wanted to get married and tell her father. Maria escaped from the school by scaling the walls of the boarding school to meet George and go tell her father about their union back in Edisto, where she was from. This embarrassed Madame Talvande as it brought her authority into question.

The school continued to operate for a few more years after the scandal, but the situation was said to have lingered with Madame Talvande, as it may have stained her and the school's reputation.

== Sword Gate House ==
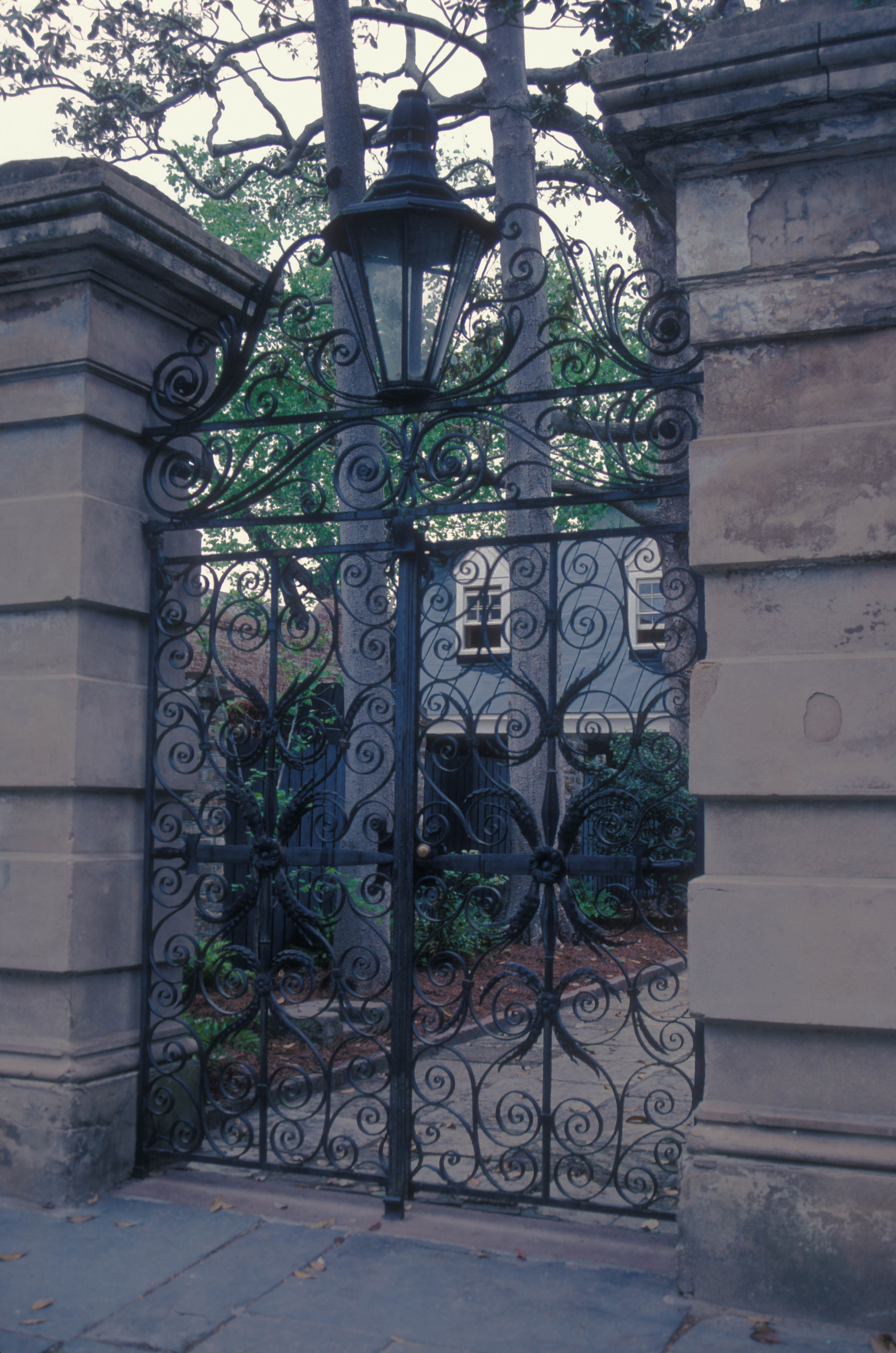
Madame Talvande's Ladies Boarding School, now known as The Sword Gate House

The former boarding school is now a private residence called the Sword Gate House, due to its iron front gate. Due to the scandal with Maria and George, many claim the house to be haunted by Madame Talvande, who is believed to be seen still roaming the halls watching over whoever is in the residence, especially at the piazza to watch for possible escapists. Visitors report doorknobs slowing turning, cold bursts of air, and an apparition peering into bedrooms.

The home was once owned by Abraham Lincoln's granddaughter, Jessie Lincoln Randolph, who bought it in 1930. The residence is one of the oldest and most expensive homes in Charleston, being over 200 years old, believed to be initially built around 1803.

Sold by the previous owners that had resided in the home since 1999, the home was initially listed at $15 million, but was sold at $10 million in 2020, after spending a decade on and off the market
