= Lincoln Home National Historic Site =

Memorial in Springfield, Illinois

Lincoln Home Site
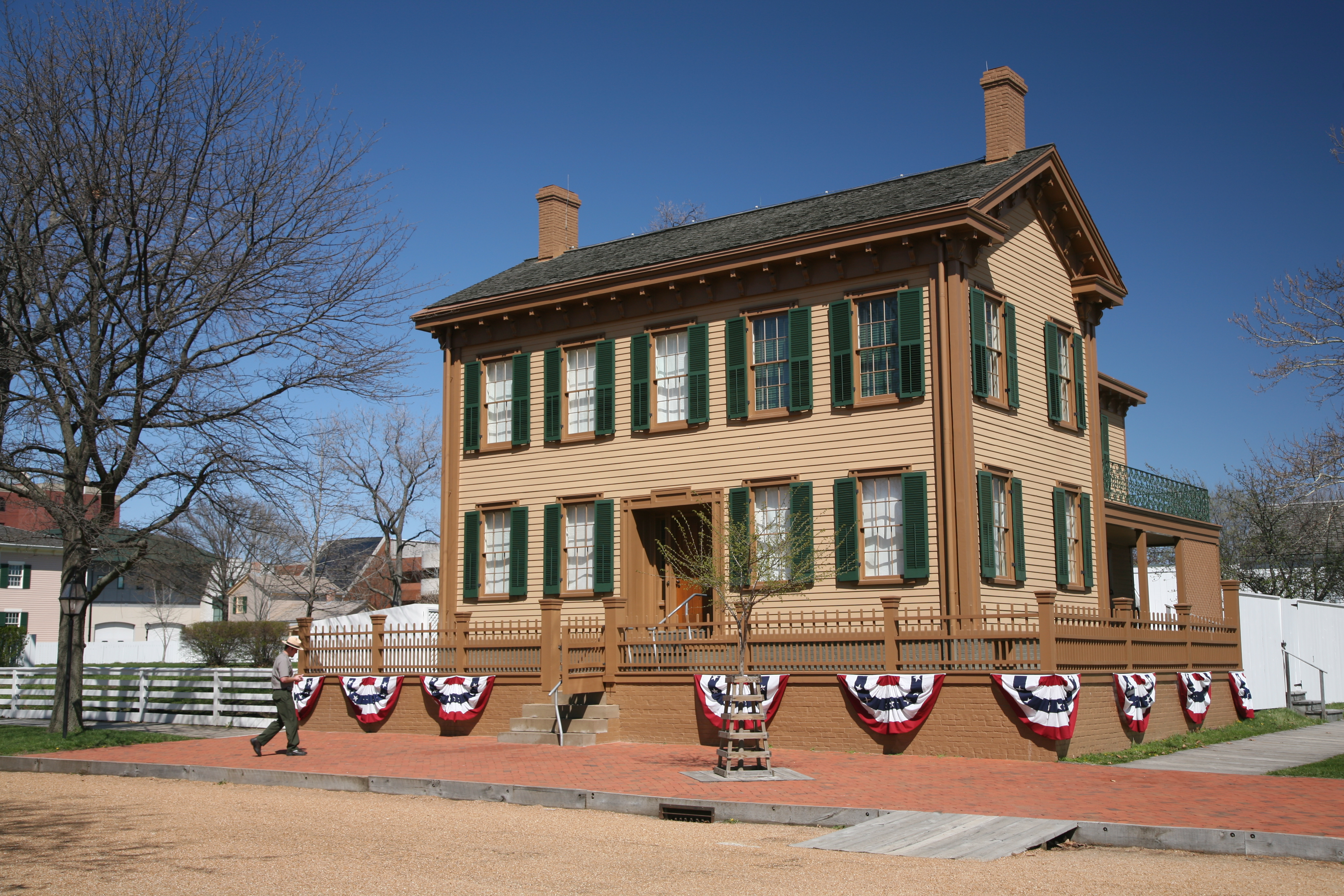
- Lincoln Home National Historic Site in April 2009

- Location within Illinois Location within the United States
- Location: Springfield, Illinois, U.S.
- Coordinates: 39°47′50″N 89°38′42″W
- Area: 12.24 acres (4.95 ha)
- Established: August 18, 1971
- Visitors: 123,544 (in 2025)
- Governing body: National Park Service
- Website: Lincoln Home National Historic Site
- Lincoln Home National Historic Site
- U.S. National Register of Historic Places
- U.S. National Historic Site
- Area: 7.8 acres (3.2 ha)
- Built: 1844
- Architectural style: Greek Revival
- NRHP reference No.: 71000076
- Added to NRHP: August 18, 1971

Lincoln Home National Historic Site preserves the Springfield, Illinois, home and related historic district where Abraham Lincoln lived from 1844 to 1861, prior to becoming the 16th president of the United States. The presidential memorial includes the four blocks surrounding the home and a visitor center.

== Historic site ==
In 1837, Lincoln moved to Springfield from New Salem at the start of his law career. He met his wife, Mary Todd, at her sister's home in Springfield and married there in 1842.

The historic-site house at 413 South Eighth Street at the corner of Jackson Street, bought by Lincoln and his wife in 1844, was the only home that Lincoln ever owned. Three of their children were born there and one, Eddie, died there. The house contains twelve rooms spread over two floors. During the time he lived here, Lincoln was elected to the House of Representatives in 1846, and elected president in 1860.

During their years on Eighth Street, the Lincolns completely renovated and expanded the home. Although there are few original artifacts in the home, conservators have been able to recreate the furniture and design through historical pictures. The Lincoln Home has been completely restored to its 1860 appearance. Of note, the Lincolns often hosted political meetings in the home and he was asked to run for president in the main parlor. Though the rear yard outhouse is not the original structure, the period building was placed in the original location and belonged to family friends of the Lincolns. The Lincolns had fully intended to return to the house after President Lincoln's presidency had he not been assassinated.

Sitting Room in home with historical contemporary newspaper image displayed which was used to decorate and restore the room.

Lincoln's son, Robert Todd Lincoln, donated the family home to the State of Illinois in 1887 under the condition that it would forever be well maintained and open to the public at no charge. This came as a result of tenants who would charge those who wanted to visit Lincoln's home and that many tenants tended to leave the home in disrepair. The home and Lincoln Tomb, also in Springfield, were designated National Historic Landmarks on December 19, 1960, and automatically listed on the National Register of Historic Places on October 15, 1966. The home and adjacent district became a National Historic Site on August 18, 1971 and is owned and administered by the National Park Service.

=== Other structures ===
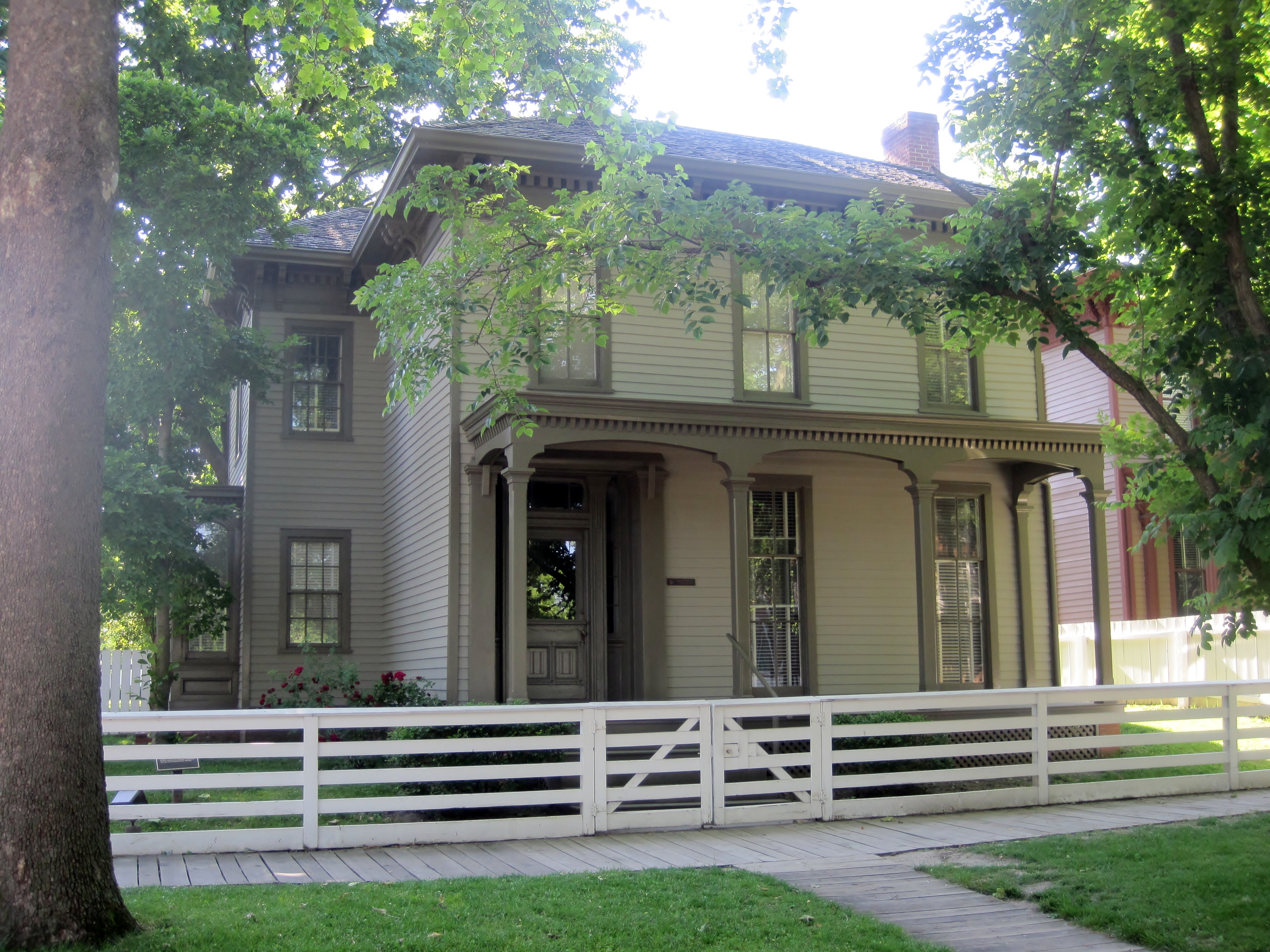
Julius Rosenwald's father purchased Lyon House in 1868

Along with the Lincoln Home, several other structures within the four-block area are also preserved. The exteriors of the homes have been restored to their appearance during the time Lincoln lived in the neighborhood, and street and sidewalks use period materials. Three of these structures, the Dean House (exhibit: "What a Pleasant Home Abe Lincoln Has"), the Corneau house (exhibit: "Voices of Springfield"), and the Arnold House (exhibit: "If These Walls Could Talk"), are open to visitors and house exhibits on the life and times of Lincoln and his neighbors. Explanatory signs for other sites tell additional neighborhood history, such as the Jameson Jenkins site for a home that was on the Underground Railroad. In total, the buildings included in the park occupy 12 acres (49,000 m^{2}). Other homes are still privately owned and occupied under regulation of the Park District. A "log cabin" wagon found on the street is modelled after a promotional vehicle used for political parades in Lincoln's time.

Samuel Rosenwald purchased the Lyon House on Eighth Street across from Lincoln's home in 1868. Samuel's son Julius Rosenwald went on to become president of Sears Roebuck and Company and a major philanthropist; the Lyon House was Julius's boyhood home. A plaque was unveiled when the house was renamed in his honor in 2020.

At selected times, and in conjunction with the Springfield Visitor Center, local historical reenactors portray Abraham Lincoln, Mary Todd Lincoln, and their neighbors or demonstrate period skills and entertainment within the park.

=== Visitor Center ===
Rangers staff the modern visitor center which has Lincoln-related artifacts on display and also shows a 23-minute theatrical documentary Abraham Lincoln: A Journey to Greatness, recreating Lincoln's personal and professional years in Springfield between about 1840 to 1860. Filming locations include Lincoln's home and neighborhood, New Salem, Illinois, The Old Capitol, and others.

== Neighborhood ==
Nearby in Springfield is the Old State Capitol where Lincoln served as a State Legislator, the building which housed the law offices of Lincoln and his partner William Herndon from 1844 until 1852, and the Lincoln Depot from which Lincoln left the city for his 1861 inauguration.

== See also ==
- National Register of Historic Places listings in Sangamon County, Illinois
- List of National Historic Landmarks in Illinois
- List of residences of presidents of the United States
- Presidential memorials in the United States
