= Robert Todd Lincoln Beckwith =

Descendant of Abraham Lincoln (1904–1985)

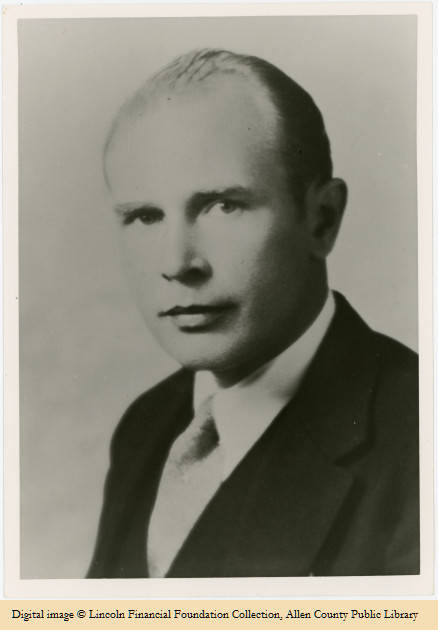
- Beckwith around 19 years old
- Born: July 19, 1904; Riverside, Illinois, U.S.
- Died: December 24, 1985 (aged 81); Hartfield, Virginia, U.S.
- Education: Georgetown University (LLB)
- Occupation: Gentleman farmer
- Spouses: Hazel Holland Wilson (m. 1927; died 1966) Annemarie Hoffman Beckwith (m. 1967; div. 1976) Margaret Hogan Fristoe (m. 1979)
- Parent(s): Warren Wallace Beckwith; Jessie Harlan Lincoln
- Relatives: Abraham Lincoln (great-grandfather)

Robert Todd Lincoln Beckwith (July 19, 1904 – December 24, 1985) was an American gentleman farmer and the great-grandson of Abraham Lincoln. In 1975, he became the last known undisputed legal descendant of Lincoln when his sister, Mary Lincoln Beckwith, died without children.

== Early life ==
Robert Todd Lincoln Beckwith was born in Riverside, Illinois, to Jessie Harlan Lincoln and Warren Wallace Beckwith. Jessie's parents were Robert Todd Lincoln—eldest son of Abraham Lincoln—and Mary Eunice Harlan. Jessie eloped in 1897 with Warren Beckwith, a classmate and football star at Iowa Wesleyan College. Before their divorce in 1907, they had two children: Mary Lincoln Beckwith, who died in 1975, and Robert Todd Lincoln Beckwith.

Beckwith attended a private school in Washington, D.C., and New York Military Academy in Cornwall, New York, in addition to spending two years at his grandfather Robert Todd Lincoln's previous boarding school, Phillips Exeter Academy. He later received a law degree from what is now Georgetown University.

== Adulthood ==
Beckwith enjoyed boating and sailing and generally avoided the media and publicity. On one occasion, a newspaper published pictures of him as a young man when he was arrested for speeding in Omaha, Nebraska.

Beckwith's mother died in 1948 and in later life, he gave his profession as "gentleman farmer of independent means", his inheritance having included a working farm in Middlesex County, Virginia.

Beckwith was a representative for Illinois Day as part of the 1964 New York World's Fair. In June 1965, he received an honorary doctorate degree from his parents' school, Iowa Wesleyan College. Also in 1965, he was a guest of honor at Chicago's commemoration ceremony upon the 100th anniversary of Lincoln's funeral.

In 1967, Beckwith was quoted as saying he "was not especially interested" in his ancestors' life in the White House. He did however retain some Lincoln memorabilia, most of which he gave to the state of Illinois, and Lincoln's rifle which he later gave to the Smithsonian Institution.

== Marriages ==
Beckwith married three times, first to Hazel Frances Holland (formerly Wilson; 1899–1966), in March 1927, second to Annemarie Hoffman (born c. 1940), in November 1967, and third to Margaret Elizabeth Hogan (formerly Fristoe; 1921–2009), in 1979. His marriage to Holland lasted nearly four decades, ending with her death in 1966. His marriage to Hoffman lasted almost nine years, ending in divorce in September 1976, and his marriage to Hogan ended with his own death, in 1985.

Beckwith never publicly acknowledged paternity for any child, making him the last confirmed descendant of Abraham Lincoln, the 16th president of the United States. However, he did have step-children through his marriages to Holland and Hogan. Hoffman alleged that her son, Timothy Lincoln Beckwith, born in 1968, during her marriage to Beckwith, was fathered by him, but her failure to present the child for paternity testing coupled with proof Beckwith had undergone a vasectomy some years prior to the child's birth led the Superior Court of the District of Columbia to declare that Beckwith was not the father. Despite the court's ruling, Timothy's claims to Beckwith's estate were never terminated, and after Beckwith's death in 1985, charitable organizations that had been named as beneficiaries in Beckwith's will offered Timothy, then 17 years old, a settlement of US$1,000,000 (equivalent to $3,000,000 in 2025) in exchange for giving up any claims to the estate. Since 1995, Timothy has worked as an assistant state's attorney in West Palm Beach, Florida, and has maintained a relatively low profile, though articles speculating about his paternity and possible relationship to Abraham Lincoln continue to be published.

== Death ==
Beckwith spent his life between Vermont and the Washington, D.C. vicinity. He died on Christmas Eve, 1985, in Hartfield, Virginia, where he had lived in a nursing home.

== See also ==
- Lincoln family
