= Edward Baker Lincoln =

Second son of Abraham and Mary Todd Lincoln (1846–1850)

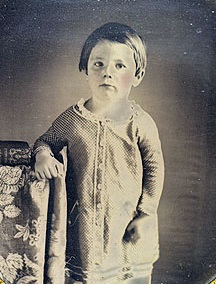
- Eddie Lincoln, age 3
- Born: March 10, 1846; Springfield, Illinois, U.S.
- Died: February 1, 1850 (aged 3); Springfield, Illinois, U.S.
- Resting place: Hutchinson's Cemetery, Springfield, Illinois (originally); Lincoln Tomb, Oak Ridge Cemetery
- Other names: Eddie, Ted
- Parent(s): Abraham Lincoln (father); Mary Todd Lincoln (mother)
- Relatives: See Lincoln family tree Robert Todd Lincoln (brother)

Edward Baker Lincoln (March 10, 1846 – February 1, 1850) was the second son of Abraham Lincoln and Mary Todd Lincoln. He was named after Lincoln's close friend, Edward Dickinson Baker. Both Abraham and Mary spelled his name "Eddy"; however, the National Park Service uses "Eddie" as a nickname and the nickname also appears spelled this way on his crypt at the Lincoln tomb.

== Life ==
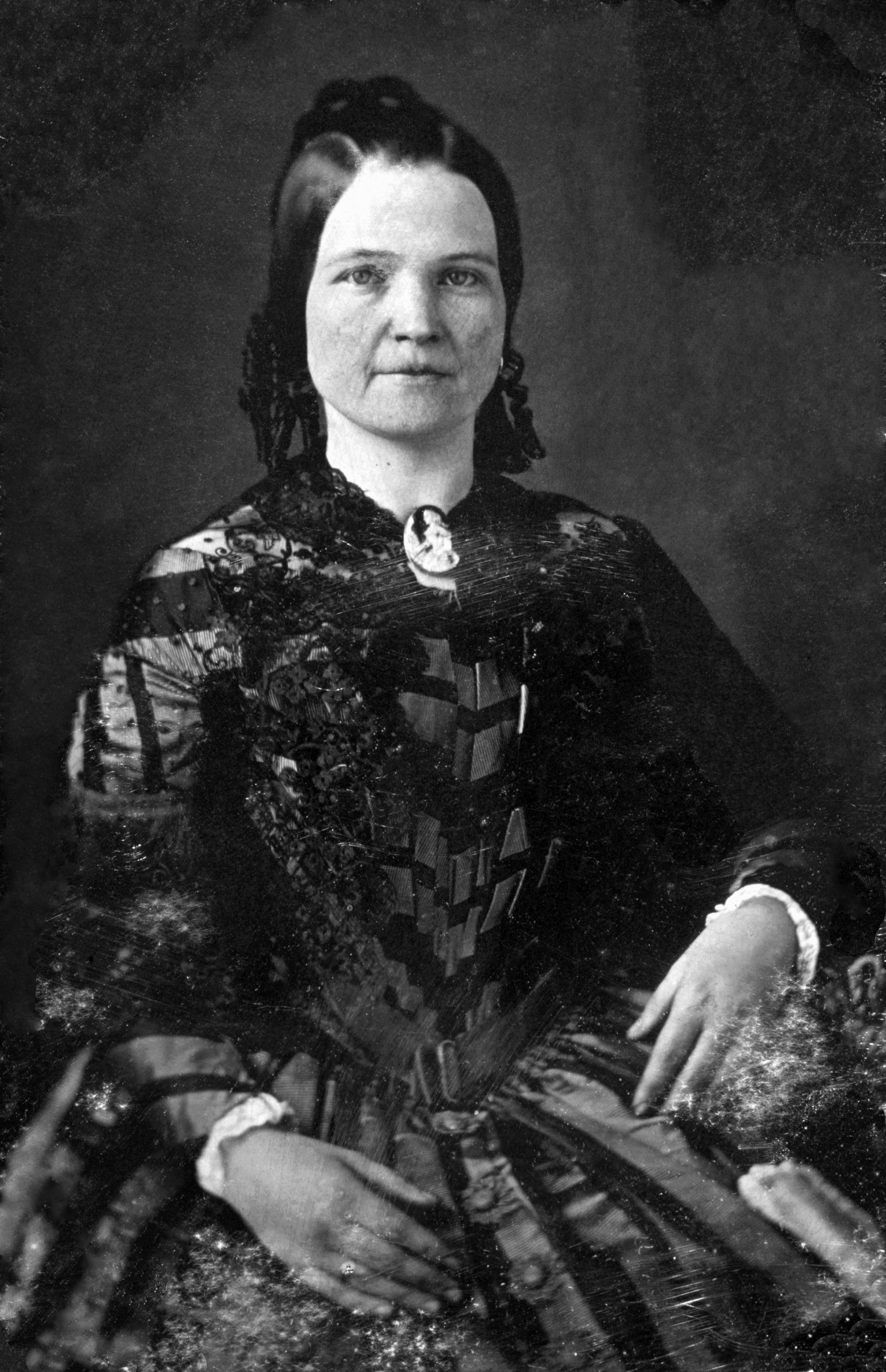
Mary Todd Lincoln, c. 1846–1847

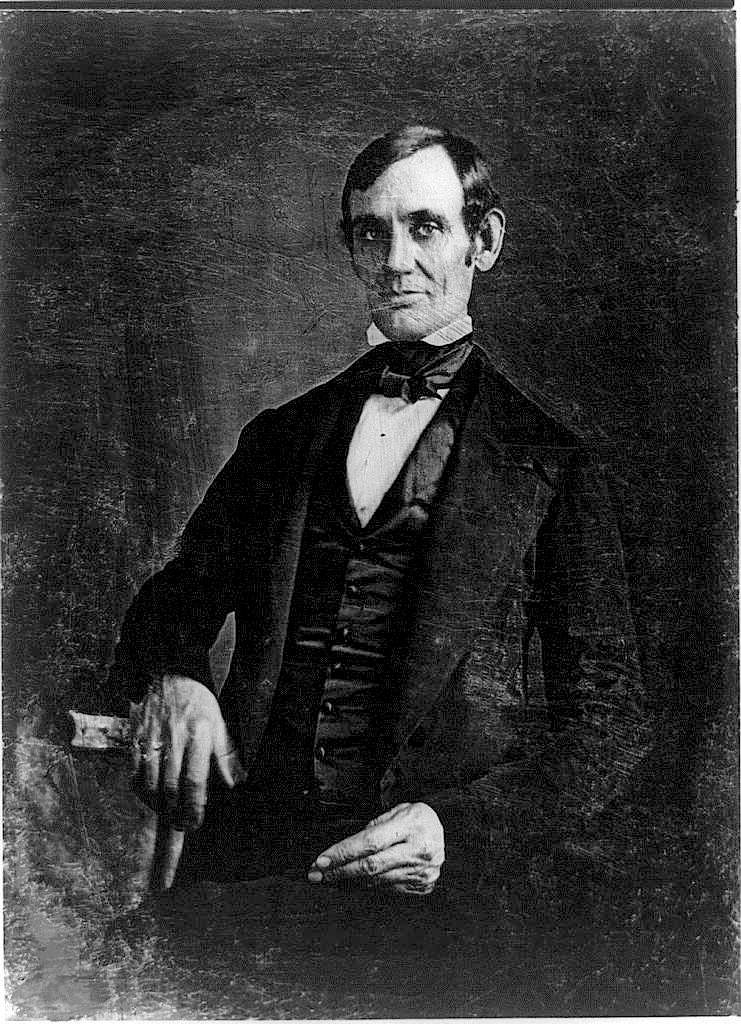
Abraham Lincoln, c. 1846–1847

Contemporary photos of Eddie's parents

Edward Baker Lincoln was born on March 10, 1846, at the Lincoln Home in Springfield, Illinois. Little is known about his life, but a surviving story says that one day during a visit to his grandfather Robert Todd's home in Lexington, Kentucky, Eddie's older brother, Robert, found a kitten and brought it to the house. Mary Lincoln wrote to her husband about the incident: "[As] soon as Eddy, spied [the kitten], his tenderness, broke forth, he made them bring it water, fed it with bread himself, with his own dear hands, he was a delighted little creature over it." Mary's stepmother, who did not like cats, ordered the cat thrown out, "Ed screaming & protesting loudly against the proceeding, she never appeared to mind his screams, which were long & loud, I assure you."

Abraham Lincoln also referenced him in an 1848 letter to his wife, also during the aforementioned time period. Lincoln mimicks the way two-year-old Eddie would say his father had gone to the Capitol: "Dear Eddy thinks father is 'gone tapila.'" He also writes about searching for plaid stockings that would "fit Eddy's dear little feet," but says ultimately that he had been unsuccessful, and finally closes his letter with, "What did he and Eddy think of the little letters father sent them? Dont [sic] let the blessed fellows forget father".

== Death ==
Eddie died at the age of 3 years and 11 months on February 1, 1850. Census records list "chronic consumption" (tuberculosis) as the cause. An alternate theory suggests that Eddie died of a different type of wasting disease, medullary thyroid cancer, part of the MEN2B genetic cancer syndrome that he possibly inherited from his father. However, this familial MEN2B theory is principally challenged by the fact that Eddie's father, Abraham Lincoln, was 56 when he was murdered. The untreated disease usually causes death around 21 years of age. Most researchers and historians subscribe to the idea that Eddie's death was caused by tuberculosis and not the MEN2B theory.

Abraham Lincoln referenced Eddie's death in a letter to his stepbrother John D. Johnston, noting that Eddie was "sick fifty-two days," and "We miss him very much."

Eddie's funeral was held at the Lincoln home by the pastor of the First Presbyterian Church, and his body was buried at the nearby Hutchinson Cemetery in Springfield, Illinois. Both parents were devastated. A week after his death, an unsigned poem entitled "Little Eddie" was printed in the Illinois Daily Journal.

Those midnight stars are sadly dimmed,
That late so brilliantly shone,
And the crimson tinge from cheek and lip,
With the heart's warm life has flown—
The angel death was hovering nigh,
And the lovely boy was called to die.

The silken waves of his glossy hair
Lie still over his marble brow,
And the pallid lip and pearly cheek
The presence of Death avow.
Pure little bud in kindness given,
In mercy taken to bloom in heaven.

Happier far is the angel child
With the harp and the crown of gold,
Who warbles now at the Saviour's feet
The glories to us untold.
Eddie, meet blossom of heavenly love,
Dwells in the spirit-world above.

Angel boy—fare thee well, farewell
Sweet Eddie, we bid thee adieu!
Affection's wail cannot reach thee now
Deep though it be, and true.
Bright is the home to him now given,
For "of such is the Kingdom of Heaven."

Authorship of the poem was long a mystery with some supposing that Abraham and Mary wrote it. In 2012, the Abraham Lincoln Association published an article in their journal that concludes neither of them did, and that it was instead an early draft by a young poet from St. Louis. The final line is on Eddie's original gravestone, which now resides in the Abraham Lincoln Presidential Library and Museum in Springfield.

Abraham and Mary's next child, Willie Lincoln, was born 10 months after Eddie's death. After Abraham's assassination, Eddie's remains were transferred to the Lincoln Tomb at Oak Ridge Cemetery in Springfield.

== See also ==
- Lincoln family tree
- Multiple endocrine neoplasia type 2B theory re: Lincoln family health
