= Mamie Lincoln Isham =

Granddaughter of Abraham Lincoln

- Isham in 1891
- Born: Mary Todd Lincoln; October 15, 1869; Chicago, Illinois, U.S.
- Died: November 21, 1938 (aged 69); New York City, New York, U.S.
- Occupation: Choir Mother
- Years active: 1884−1938
- Spouse: Charles Bradford Isham (m. 1891; died 1919)
- Children: Lincoln Isham
- Parent(s): Robert Todd Lincoln; Mary Eunice Harlan
- Relatives: Lincoln family

Mary Todd "Mamie" Lincoln Isham (October 15, 1869 – November 21, 1938) was an American choir mother. She was a granddaughter of Abraham Lincoln, the first daughter of Robert Todd Lincoln, and the mother of Lincoln Isham.

== Early life ==
Mamie was born Mary Todd Lincoln to Mary Eunice Harlan and Robert Todd Lincoln at the Robert Lincoln home in Chicago, Illinois. As a child, she was called by the nickname of "Little Mamie".

Her father would often bring Mamie to visit his mother, Mary Todd Lincoln. It is believed that Robert addressed Mamie as Mary's "favorite grandchild". On one visit, Mary Lincoln gave her granddaughter two very expensive dolls.

Mamie and her siblings were described as "bright, natural, unpretentious children, well liked by the people of the town". Mamie and her sister, Jessie, were piano students in the summer session of Iowa Wesleyan in 1886.

Mamie later became a member of the Mount Pleasant Chapter A of the P.E.O. Sisterhood one month before her birthday, on September 17, 1884. Her sister Jessie was later accepted by the same organization on December 31, 1895, more than 11 years later.

== Personal life ==
Mamie Lincoln became engaged in London and then married Charles Bradford Isham, the son of merchant and banker William Bradley Isham, on September 2, 1891, and bought a place in Manchester, Vermont, known as the 1811 house. In 1892, she had her only child in New York City:

- Lincoln Isham (1892–1971), who married Leahalma Correa (1892–1960), the daughter of the Spaniard Carlos Correa and the Englishwoman Mary Gooding in August 1919. They did not have any children together.

She lived the rest of her life in New York City including the address 19 East 72nd Street, where she was a choir mother of Grace Church on Broadway. On June 9, 1919, her husband died, leaving her a widow, but she continued to live in New York City for the next 19 years until she became gravely ill herself in 1938. She died in NewYork-Presbyterian Hospital on November 21, 1938, at around 10:05 a.m. at the age of 69. She is buried in Woodlawn Cemetery in the Bronx, New York City.

At the time of her death, Isham was the owner of the Healy Portrait of Lincoln, which had been left to her by her mother. It was given to the White House collection when she died.

== See also ==
- Lincoln family
