= Mary Lincoln Beckwith =

Descendant of Abraham Lincoln (1898–1975)

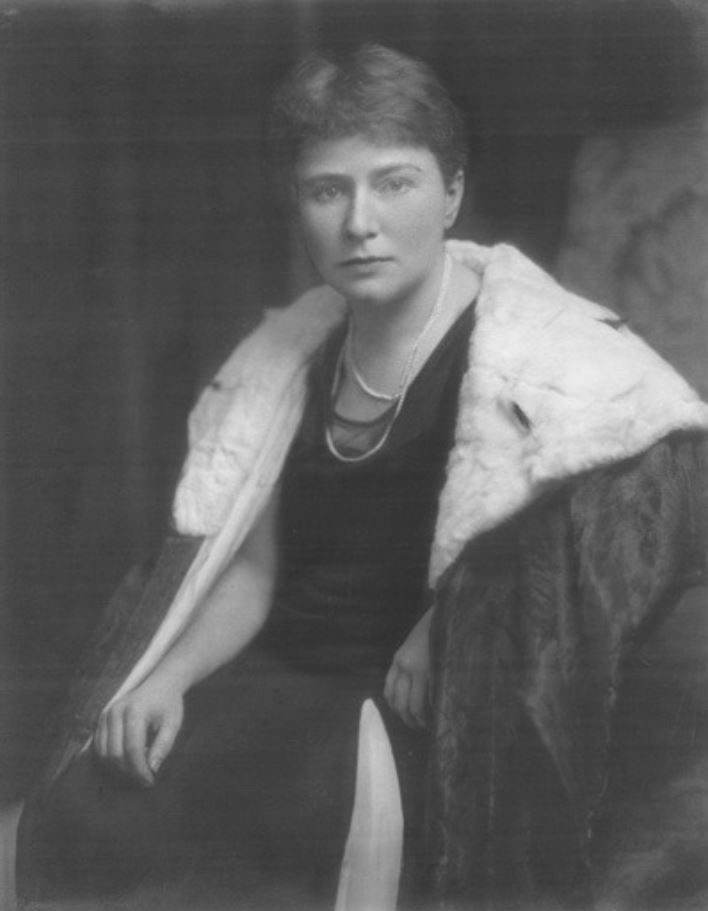
- An undated photograph of Beckwith
- Born: August 22, 1898; Henry County, Iowa, U.S.
- Died: July 10, 1975 (aged 76); Rutland, Vermont, U.S.
- Parents: Warren Wallace Beckwith; Jessie Harlan Lincoln
- Relatives: Abraham Lincoln (great-grandfather)

Mary Lincoln Beckwith (August 22, 1898 – July 10, 1975) was a prominent descendant of Abraham Lincoln. Beckwith was the great-granddaughter and one of the last two confirmed descendants of Abraham Lincoln, along with her younger brother Robert.

== Early life ==
"Peggy" Lincoln at age 14.

Beckwith was born to Jessie Harlan Lincoln and Warren Wallace Beckwith on August 22, 1898, in Mount Pleasant, Iowa. She got the nickname "Peggy" from her grandfather Robert Todd Lincoln, who described her hair as "flying in the sun" when he wrote to his Aunt Emile Todd Helm. People who were close to her called her "Peggy".

Raised with her brother in Manchester, VT at the home of her grandfather, Robert Todd Lincoln, at a farm known as Hildene, the family estate in Vermont, she later grew up in Washington, D.C., and was said to have become "a squat, fair-haired, blue-eyed, chain smoker who golfed and dabbled in oil painting and sculpture." Beckwith attended the Madeira School, then called Miss Madeira's School, a private prep school, but she did not go on to college afterwards.

Prior to World War I, she was a representative on the committee on public information in Cuba. In 1918, she returned to the family farm to fill positions left by men who had gone to war. Beckwith took an agricultural course at Cornell, and wanted to organize young women to work the farm.

Beckwith was interested in aviation. Her first time flying was to ask for a ride in a plane at the Curtiss airport in Baltimore in 1930 and afterwards "she announced without any further formalities that she would like to learn to fly by herself." She earned her private pilot's license by 1931. In the 1930s, she built a private landing strip in Manchester VT, and purchased a number of airplanes. One of them was a three-seat sports plane. She also owned a Cutliss Gypsy Moth and a Traveler. During this time she was living at Hildene with her grandmother, Mary Harlan Lincoln.

By 1938, Beckwith was operating a 412-acre dairy farm at Hildene. She had inherited this property following the death of her grandmother, Mary Harlan Lincoln, in 1938.

== Later life ==
Beckwith never married or had children, and it was rumored she was a lesbian. She ran Hildene "as a farm" and dabbled in art and sculpture. Despite her desire to eschew publicity, she was well known by the local farm community. She was known to conduct errands in the town around Hildene "dressed in blue jeans overalls, with a shirt and a man's cap."

Beckwith christened the submarine Abraham Lincoln on May 14, 1960.

She died on July 10, 1975, at around 2:15 a.m. at Rutland Hospital in Rutland, Vermont, a month before her 77th birthday. She had requested that her ashes be spread over her estate; this request was granted and there was no funeral or memorial service held. Upon her death, her brother Robert Todd Lincoln Beckwith became the last living descendant of Abraham Lincoln.

== See also ==
- Lincoln family tree

== Notes ==
Dallas Morning News obituary, July 12, 1975, gave her name as "Miss Mary Todd Lincoln Beckwith".
