= Hildene =

Historic building in Vermont, US

- U.S. National Register of Historic Places
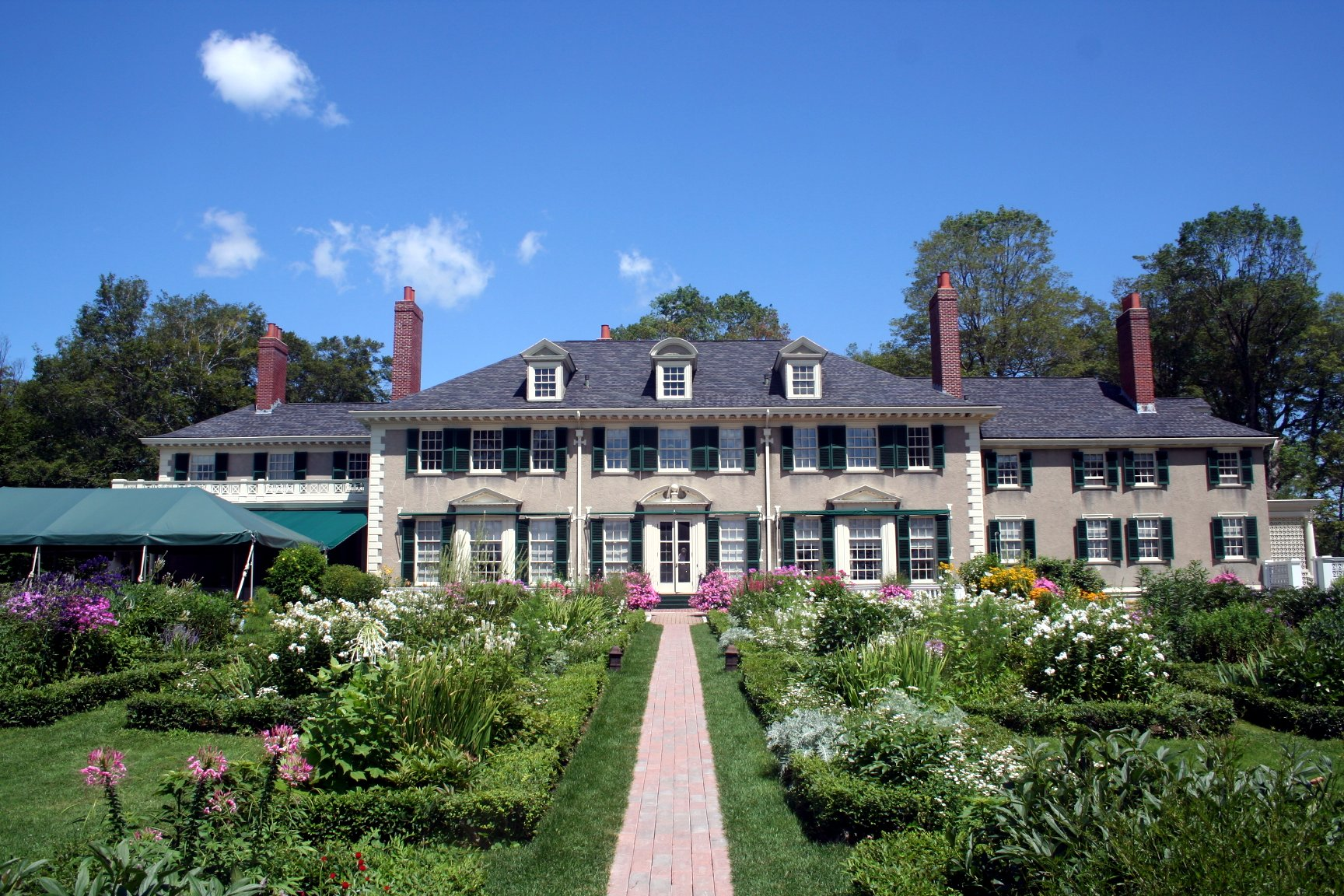
- Hildene seen from the garden in 2006
- Location: 1005 Hildene Rd. Manchester Center, Vermont
- Coordinates: 43°8′25″N 73°4′46″W
- Architect: Shepley, Rutan & Coolidge
- Architectural style: Georgian Revival
- Website: www.hildene.org
- NRHP reference No.: 77000095
- Added to NRHP: October 28, 1977

Hildene, the Lincoln Family Home is the former summer home of Robert Todd Lincoln and his wife Mary Harlan Lincoln, located at 1005 Hildene Road in Manchester Center, Vermont.

== History ==
Robert Todd Lincoln was the eldest of the four sons of President Abraham Lincoln and his wife Mary Todd Lincoln, and the only one of them to survive into adulthood. He first visited Manchester Center, Vermont at age 20 in the summer of 1863 when he, his brother Tad, and their mother stayed at the nearby Equinox House to escape the heat of Washington, D.C.

Hildene remained occupied by descendants of the Lincoln family until 1975, when the next to last descendant of the Lincoln-Harlan family, Mary Lincoln Beckwith, granddaughter of Robert and Mary and daughter of Jessie and Warren Wallace Beckwith, died there. In 1978 the non-profit organization, the Friends of Hildene, purchased the property and began restoration of the house, outbuildings and gardens.

== Landscape ==
The name Hildene is from the old English words meaning "hill" and "valley with stream". Completed in 1905 in the Georgian Revival style, the house is located on a 300-foot (91 m) promontory overlooking the Battenkill Valley. Approximately half of the 412-acre (167 ha) estate is located at the lower level of the valley and includes meadows and wetlands. A formal garden in the form of a cathedral's stained glass window was planted in 1907. The window pattern is defined by privet hedge and filled with mixed borders of annual and perennial flowering plants providing the multicolored "stained glass." The garden is especially noted for its collection of over 1,000 herbaceous peonies.

In 2008, the Rowland Agricultural Center at Hildene Farm opened to the public with its herd of Nubian goats and cheese-making facility. In the summer of 2011, the restored 1903 wooden Pullman palace car, Sunbeam, made its home at the Manchester estate. The car came off the line during Robert's tenure as president of the Pullman Company.

== Interior ==
Hildene is furnished almost entirely with Lincoln family furniture and contains artifacts belonging to Robert Todd Lincoln and his parents. In 1908 an Æolian pipe organ was installed at a cost of $11,500. In 1980 the Friends of Hildene restored the organ.

== See also ==
- National Register of Historic Places listings in Bennington County, Vermont
