= Jessie Harlan Lincoln =

Granddaughter of Abraham Lincoln (1875–1948)

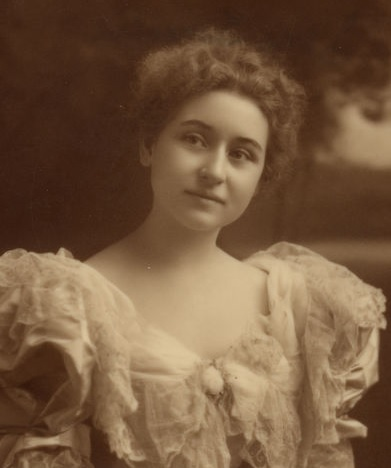
- Born: November 6, 1875; Chicago, Illinois, U.S.
- Died: January 4, 1948 (aged 72); Rutland, Vermont, U.S.
- Spouses: Warren Wallace Beckwith (m. 1897; div. 1907) Frank Edward Johnson (m. 1915; div. 1925) Robert John Randolph (m. 1926)
- Children: Mary; Robert
- Parent(s): Robert Todd Lincoln (father); Mary Eunice Harlan (mother)
- Relatives: Abraham Lincoln (paternal grandfather)

Jessie Harlan Lincoln (November 6, 1875 – January 4, 1948) was an American known for being a granddaughter of Abraham Lincoln. She was the second daughter of Robert Todd Lincoln and the mother of Mary Lincoln Beckwith and Robert Todd Lincoln Beckwith.

== Early life ==
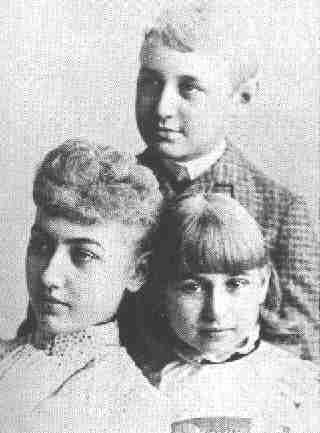
Jessie Harlan Lincoln (right), with her siblings Abraham II (top) and Mary (left)

Jessie Harlan Lincoln was born on November 6, 1875, in Chicago to Mary and Robert Todd Lincoln. At the time of her birth, Robert Lincoln was practicing law in Chicago. She was the last of three children of Robert Todd Lincoln. Jessie's sister and brother were, respectively:

- Mary "Mamie" Lincoln, October 15, 1869 – November 21, 1938
- Abraham "Jack" Lincoln II, August 14, 1873 – March 5, 1890

Lincoln spent part of her childhood in Washington, D.C., when her father was Secretary of War from 1881 to 1885. She later lived in London, England, when her father was the Minister to Great Britain from 1889 to 1893. Jessie's brother, Abraham Lincoln II, died on March 5, 1890, in London at the age of 16, and three years later, the family returned to America, ultimately to Mary Eunice Harlan's mother's residence in Mount Pleasant, Iowa. Jessie and her sister were piano students in the summer session of Iowa Wesleyan in 1886. She was later initiated into the Pleasant Chapter A of the P.E.O. Sisterhood on December 31, 1895, an organization of which her sister, Mamie, had become a member more than 11 years prior.

In 1919, while Lincoln was married to her second husband, her father established a trust for her and her sister, Mary Lincoln Isham. For Isham's trust, he deposited 375 shares of Commonwealth Edison stock worth slightly more than $38,000 (equivalent to $706,000 in 2025) and 1,000 shares of National Biscuit stock worth $85,000 (equivalent to $1,578,000 in 2025). For Jessie, he deposited 1,000 shares of Commonwealth Edison stock worth $101,750 (equivalent to $1,890,000 in 2025) and 1,000 shares of National Biscuit stock worth $85,000 (equivalent to $1,578,000 in 2025). It was purported that Jessie received more because she was often irresponsible with her finances. In 1920, he deposited another 1,250 shares of Commonwealth Edison stock worth than $100,000 (equivalent to $1,607,000 in 2025) into Jessie's trust fund.

== Personal life ==
=== Marriages ===
On November 10, 1897, she married Warren Wallace Beckwith, in Milwaukee, Wisconsin, at 2:30 in the afternoon. Beckwith was a member of the Mt. Pleasant Football Team and Jessie's father, Robert, strongly and bitterly opposed the couple's being together. He believed their relationship had ended until news of their elopement reached him and his family. He hurried to Jessie's room only to find it empty and that Jessie had married several hours before. In Des Moines County, Iowa in 1898, she gave birth to her first child, Mary Lincoln Beckwith (1898–1975). She continued to live in Mount Pleasant, Iowa, and on July 19, 1904, had her second and last child, Robert Todd Lincoln Beckwith (1904–1985), named after her father. Robert Todd Lincoln Beckwith was the last undisputed descendant of Abraham Lincoln.

In 1907, Jessie divorced Warren Beckwith. Her second marriage was to Frank Edward Johnson in 1915. They divorced in 1925.

In 1926, Jessie married her third and final husband, Robert John Randolph, an electrical engineer of the Randolph family of Virginia. Her later two marriages did not produce any more children.

=== Death ===
From 1946 until her death in 1948, Lincoln lived at their summer estate, Hildene, in Manchester, Vermont. On January 4, 1948, Jessie Harlan Lincoln died at the age of 72 at Rutland Hospital in Rutland, Vermont.

== See also ==
- Lincoln family tree
