= Robert Todd Lincoln =

American lawyer and politician (1843–1926)

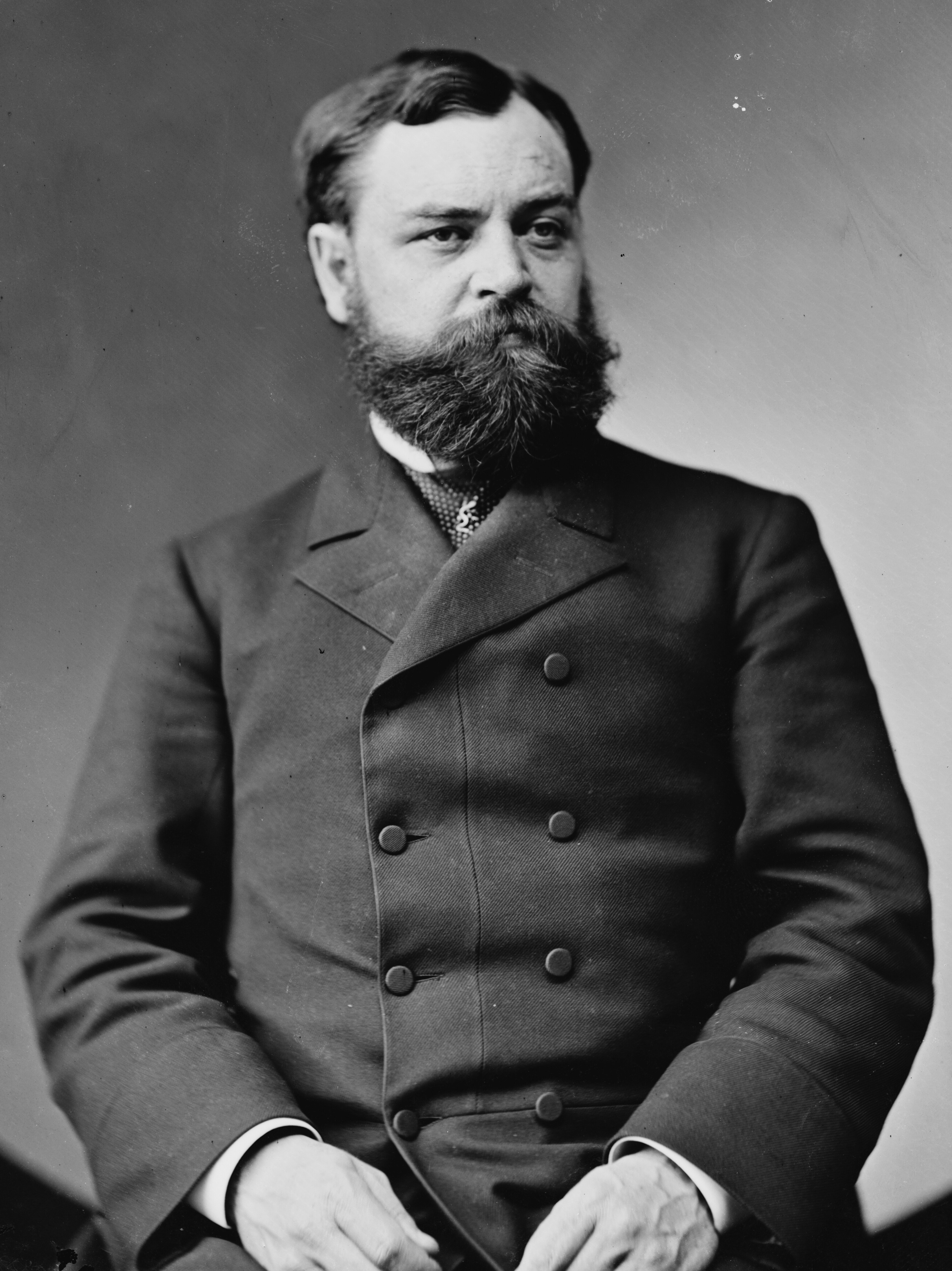
- Portrait by Brady c. 1870–1880

30th Minister to the United Kingdom
- In office May 25, 1889 – May 4, 1893
- President: Benjamin Harrison; Grover Cleveland
- Preceded by: Edward John Phelps
- Succeeded by: Thomas F. Bayard (as Ambassador)

35th United States Secretary of War
- In office March 5, 1881 – March 4, 1885
- President: James A. Garfield; Chester A. Arthur
- Preceded by: Alexander Ramsey
- Succeeded by: William Crowninshield Endicott

Personal details
- Born: August 1, 1843 Springfield, Illinois, U.S.
- Died: July 26, 1926 (aged 82) Manchester, Vermont, U.S.
- Resting place: Arlington National Cemetery
- Party: Republican
- Spouse: Mary Eunice Harlan (m. 1868)
- Children: Mamie Lincoln Isham; Abraham "Jack" Lincoln II; Jessie Harlan Lincoln
- Parents: Abraham Lincoln; Mary Todd Lincoln
- Relatives: Lincoln family
- Education: Harvard University (AB); Northwestern University (LLB)

Military service
- Allegiance: United States
- Branch/service: United States Army
- Years of service: February 11 – June 12, 1865
- Rank: Captain
- Battles/wars: American Civil War; Appomattox Campaign; Battle of Appomattox Court House

Robert Todd Lincoln (August 1, 1843 – July 26, 1926) was an American lawyer and businessman. He was the eldest son of President Abraham Lincoln and First Lady Mary Todd Lincoln and the only one of their four sons to live past age 18. Lincoln became a business lawyer and company president, serving as both United States Secretary of War (1881–1885) and the U.S. Ambassador to Great Britain (1889–1893).

Lincoln was born in Springfield, Illinois, and graduated from Harvard College. He then served on the staff of General Ulysses S. Grant as a captain in the Union army in the closing days of the American Civil War. After the war was over, Lincoln married Mary Eunice Harlan, and they had three children together. Following completion of his law school studies in Chicago, Lincoln built a successful law practice and became wealthy representing corporate clients.

Lincoln was often spoken of as a possible candidate for national office, including the presidency, but never took steps to mount a campaign. He served as Secretary of War in the administration of James A. Garfield, continuing under Chester A. Arthur, and as Minister to Great Britain in the Benjamin Harrison administration.

Lincoln became general counsel of the Pullman Company, and after founder George Pullman died in 1897, Lincoln assumed the company's presidency. After retiring from this position in 1911, he served as chairman of the board until 1924. In his later years, Lincoln resided at homes in Washington, D.C., and Manchester, Vermont; the Manchester home, Hildene, was added to the National Register of Historic Places in 1977. In 1922, he took part in the dedication ceremonies for the Lincoln Memorial. Lincoln died at Hildene on July 26, 1926, six days before his 83rd birthday, and was buried at Arlington National Cemetery.

== Early life ==
Robert Todd Lincoln was born in Springfield, Illinois, on August 1, 1843, to Abraham Lincoln and Mary Todd Lincoln. He had three younger brothers: Edward, William, and Tad. By the time Lincoln was born, his father had become a well-known member of the Whig political party and had served as a member of the Illinois state legislature for four terms. Lincoln was named after his maternal grandfather, Robert Smith Todd.

Some commentators believe that Robert Lincoln had a distant relationship with his father, in part because, during Robert's formative years, Abraham Lincoln spent months away on the judicial circuit. Robert recalled, "During my childhood and early youth he was almost constantly away from home, attending court or making political speeches." (Note: David Herbert Donald wrote, "Robert's principal memory of his father during those years was of his loading his saddlebags in preparation for going out on the circuit" for his travels through Illinois. Footnotes in his Lincoln biography indicate that Donald's statement about this being such a large part of Lincoln's childhood is based on the writings of Lincoln biographer Frederick Trevor Hill and scholar Wayne C. Temple. In 1906, Hill related, "The Hon. Robert Lincoln told the writer that he distinctly remembers seeing his father start out on horseback, with his saddle-bags, to accompany the judge on the circuit." In 1960, Temple wrote that the saddlebags were Lincoln's first memory.) Abraham apparently realized that his being away had a potential impact on his sons as evidenced by the following quote from his April 16, 1848, letter to his wife: "don't let the blessed fellows forget Father". One such example that gives insight into Robert's childhood in general was related by Joseph Humphreys, who had taken a train to Lexington, Kentucky, in 1847: "there were two lively youngsters on board who kept the whole train in a turmoil, and their long-legged father, instead of spanking the brats, looked pleased as Punch and aided and abetted the older one in mischief".

Lincoln took the Harvard College entrance examination in 1859, but failed 15 out of the 16 subjects. Subsequently, Lincoln was enrolled at Phillips Exeter Academy to prepare for college, graduating in 1860. Admitted to Harvard, he graduated in 1864, having been elected vice-president of the Hasty Pudding Club, and was a member of the Delta Kappa Epsilon (Alpha chapter) fraternity. Historian Jan Morris opines that Robert Lincoln, "having failed fifteen out of sixteen subjects in the Harvard entrance examination, got in at last and emerged an unsympathetic bore."

== Civil War years ==
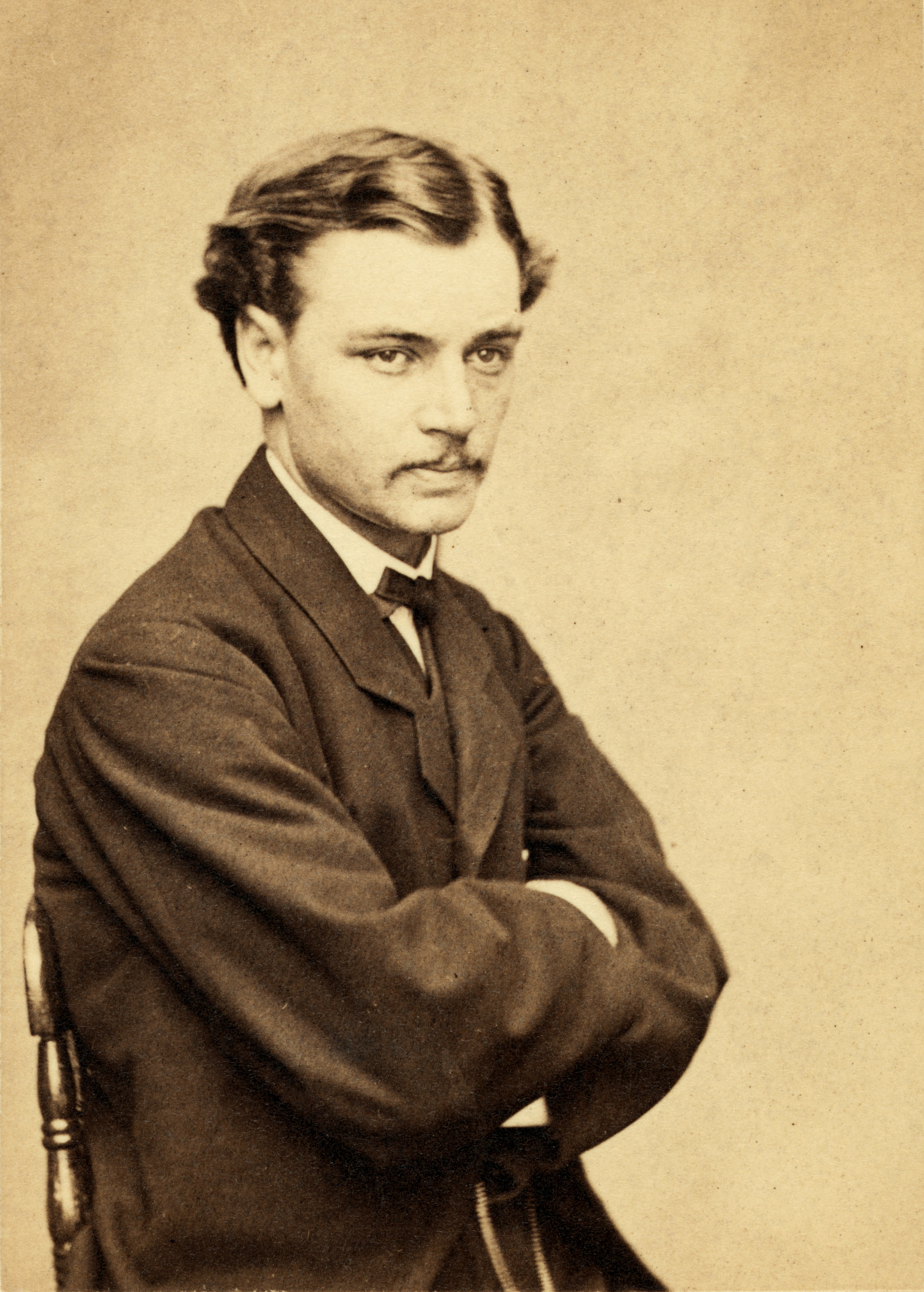
Portrait by Brady c. 1865

After graduating from Harvard, Robert Lincoln enrolled at Harvard Law School, which he attended from September 1864 to January 1865, when he left in order to join the Union Army.

Mary Todd Lincoln had prevented Robert from joining the Army until shortly before the war's conclusion. President Lincoln argued to her that "our son is not more dear to us than the sons of other people are to their mothers." In January 1865, the First Lady gave in and President Lincoln wrote Ulysses S. Grant, asking if Robert could be placed on his staff.

On February 11, 1865, Lincoln was commissioned as an assistant adjutant with the rank of captain. He served in the last weeks of the Civil War on Grant's staff, a status which meant, in all likelihood, he would not be involved in actual combat. According to Grant's personal secretary, Horace Porter, Lincoln was "exceedingly popular" with the rest of the staff, "was always ready to perform his share of hard work" and "never expected to be treated differently from any other officer" because he was the President's son.

Lincoln was present at Appomattox when Robert E. Lee surrendered. He resigned his commission on June 12, 1865, and returned to civilian life.

=== Incident with Edwin Booth ===
Lincoln was once saved from possible serious injury or death by Edwin Booth, whose brother, John Wilkes Booth, assassinated Robert's father. This event took place on a train platform in Jersey City, New Jersey. The exact date is uncertain, but it is believed to have taken place in late 1863 or early 1864. In a letter written in 1909 to the editor of The Century Magazine, Robert Lincoln recalled what had happened that day:

The incident occurred while a group of passengers were late at night purchasing their sleeping car places from the conductor who stood on the station platform at the entrance of the car. The platform was about the height of the car floor, and there was of course a narrow space between the platform and the car body. There was some crowding, and I happened to be pressed by it against the car body while waiting my turn. In this situation the train began to move, and by the motion I was twisted off my feet, and had dropped somewhat, with feet downward, into the open space, and was personally helpless, when my coat collar was vigorously seized and I was quickly pulled up and out to a secure footing on the platform. Upon turning to thank my rescuer I saw it was Edwin Booth, whose face was of course well known to me, and I expressed my gratitude to him, and in doing so, called him by name.

Months afterwards, while serving on Grant's US Army staff, Robert Lincoln recalled the occurrence to Colonel Adam Badeau, a fellow officer who happened to be a friend of Edwin Booth's. Badeau sent a letter to Booth, complimenting Booth for his heroism. Before receiving the letter, Booth had been unaware that the man whose life he had saved on the train platform was the president's son. The knowledge of whom he had saved that day was said to have been of some comfort to Booth following his brother's assassination of the president. Grant also sent Booth a letter of gratitude.

=== Lincoln assassination and afterwards ===
On the night his father was assassinated, Robert had turned down an invitation to accompany the Lincolns to Ford's Theatre due to fatigue from being at the battlefront. Ten days later, Robert Lincoln wrote President Andrew Johnson requesting that he and his family be allowed to stay in the Executive mansion for two and a half weeks because his mother had told him that "she can not possibly be ready to leave here", and Johnson acquiesced.

In late April 1865, Robert moved to Chicago with his remaining family. He attended law classes at the Old University of Chicago and studied law at the Chicago firm of Scammon, McCagg & Fuller.

On January 1, 1866, Lincoln moved out of the apartment he shared with his mother and brother. He rented his own rooms in downtown Chicago to "begin to live with some degree of comfort" which he had not known when living in cramped conditions with his family. Lincoln graduated from Old University (Note: When Lincoln graduated, the law school was a department in the Old University of Chicago. In 1873, the law department became co-affiliated with Northwestern University and this college of law became the Northwestern University School of Law in 1891.) with an LL.B. in 1866 and became licensed as an attorney in Chicago on February 22, 1867. He was certified to practice law four days later.

In 1893, Harvard awarded Lincoln the honorary degree of LL.D.

== Family ==
=== Marriage and children ===
On September 24, 1868, Lincoln married Mary Eunice Harlan, daughter of Senator James Harlan and Ann Eliza Peck of Mount Pleasant, Iowa. They had three children: Mary "Mamie" Lincoln, Abraham "Jack" Lincoln II, and Jessie Harlan Lincoln.

Robert, Mary, and the children would often leave their hot city life behind for the cooler climate of Mount Pleasant, during the 1880s the family would summer at the Harlan home there. The Harlan-Lincoln home, built in 1876, still stands today. Donated by Robert's wife, Mary Harlan Lincoln, to Iowa Wesleyan College in 1907, it now serves as a museum containing a collection of artifacts from the Lincoln family and from Abraham Lincoln's presidency.

Robert's younger daughter, Jessie Harlan Lincoln Beckwith, had two children, namely Mary Lincoln Beckwith ("Peggy") and Robert Todd Lincoln Beckwith, but neither of them had children of their own. Robert's other daughter, Mary ("Mamie") Todd Lincoln, married Charles Bradford Isham in 1891; they had one son, Lincoln Isham, who married Leahalma Correa in 1919, but died without children. Robert's son, Jack, died from an infection at age 16. The last person acknowledged and known to be of Lincoln lineage, Robert's grandson Robert Todd Lincoln Beckwith, died in 1985.

=== Relationship with Mary Todd Lincoln ===
In 1871, Lincoln's only surviving brother, Tad, died at age 18, leaving his mother devastated. Lincoln was already concerned about what he considered were his mother's compulsive and extravagant spending, hallucinations, and eccentric behaviors. Fearing that she was a danger to herself, Lincoln arranged to have her committed to a psychiatric hospital in Batavia, Illinois, in 1875. With his mother in the hospital, Lincoln was left with control of her finances, although he used his own money to pay for her care. As the head of the family, Lincoln felt that it was his duty to protect her, and expressed his wish that she would have "every liberty and privilege" restored to her as she was treated. On May 20, 1875, Mary Lincoln arrived at Bellevue Place, a private, upscale sanitarium in the Fox River Valley.

Three months after she started living there, Mary Lincoln was able to escape from Bellevue Place. She smuggled letters to her lawyer, James B. Bradwell, and his wife, Myra. Mary also wrote to the editor of the Chicago Times and shortly, the embarrassment Robert had hoped to avoid came to the forefront, with his motives and character being publicly questioned. Bellevue's director, who at Mary's commitment trial assured the jury she would benefit from treatment at his facility, now declared her well enough to go to Springfield to live with her sister. Her commitment and subsequent events alienated Lincoln from his mother.

== Politics ==
=== Secretary of War (1881–1885) ===
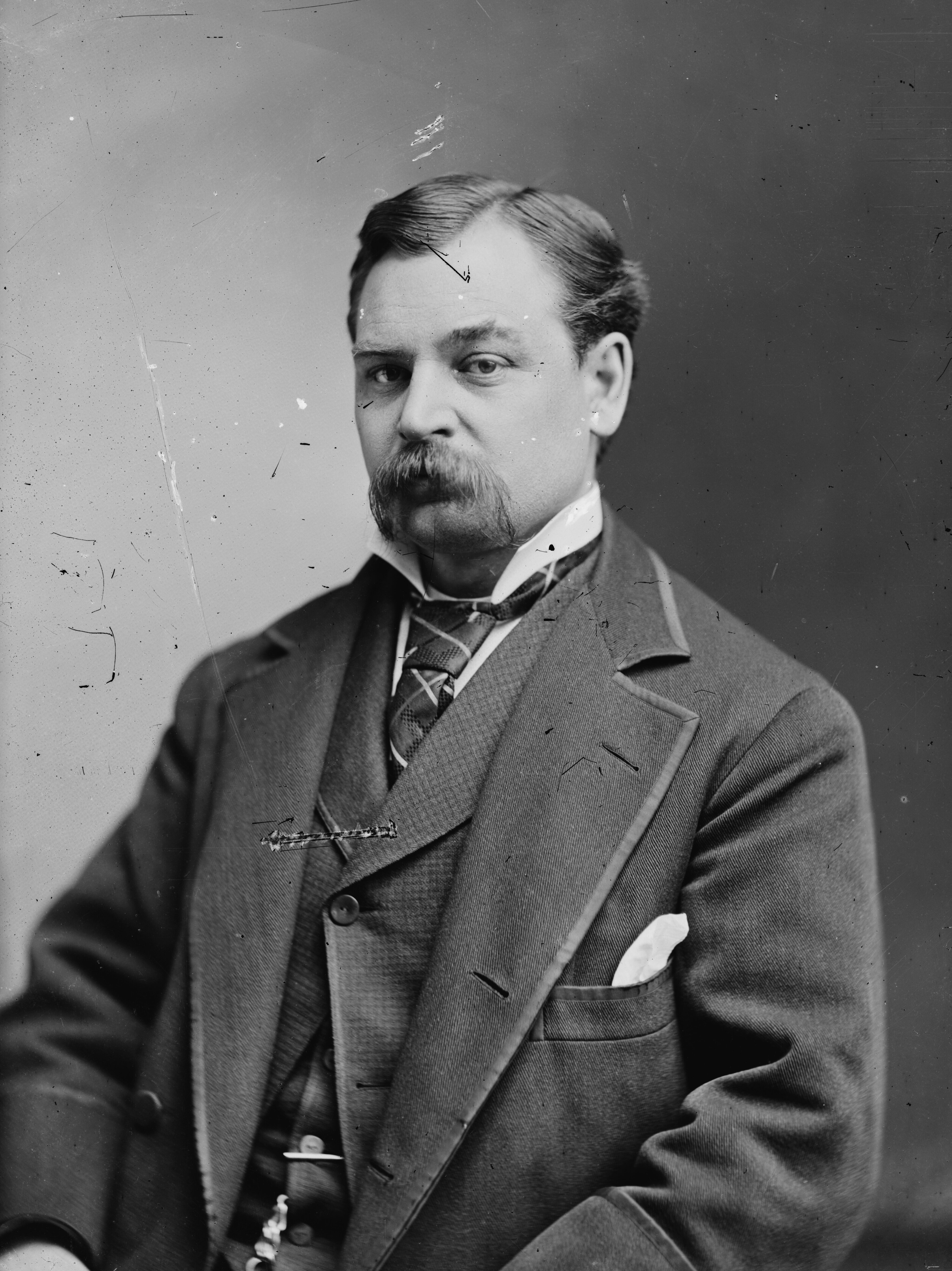
Portrait by Brady c. 1870–1880

From 1876 to 1877, Lincoln served as Town Supervisor of South Chicago, a town which was later absorbed into the city of Chicago. In 1877, Lincoln rejected President Rutherford B. Hayes' offer to appoint him Assistant Secretary of State. Lincoln was appointed by President James Garfield as Secretary of War and served from 1881 to 1885 under Garfield and then Chester A. Arthur.

During his term in office, the Cincinnati Riots of 1884 broke out over a case in which a jury returned a verdict of manslaughter rather than murder in a case that many suspected was rigged. Fifty-six people died during three days of rioting before U.S. troops dispatched by Lincoln reestablished calm.

Subsequent to serving as Secretary of War, Lincoln assisted Oscar Dudley to establish the Illinois Industrial Training School for Boys (now known as Glenwood Academy) in Norwood Park in 1887, after Dudley (a Humane Society employee) "discovered more homeless, neglected and abused boys than dogs on the city streets."

=== Republican politics ===
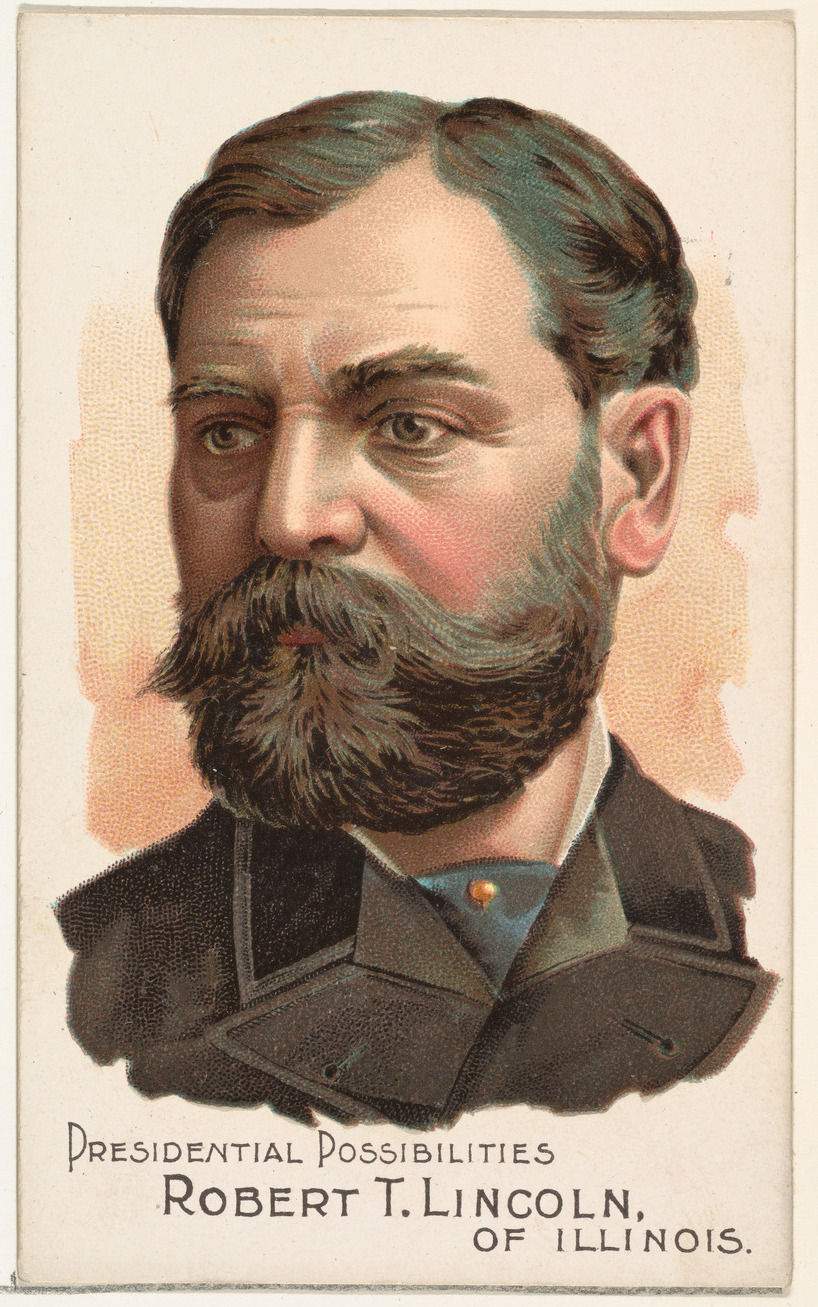
Presidential Possibilities card issued by Duke Sons & Co. to promote Honest Long Cut Tobacco, 1888

From 1884 to 1912, Lincoln's name was mentioned in varying degrees of seriousness as a candidate for the Republican presidential or vice-presidential nomination. He repeatedly disavowed any interest in running and stated that he would not accept nomination for either position. Lincoln's likeness was included in an 1888 set of "Presidential Possibilities" cards.

=== Minister to Great Britain ===
Lincoln served as the U.S. minister to Great Britain, formally to the Court of St James's, from 1889 to 1893 in the Administration of President Benjamin Harrison. It was during this time that Lincoln's teenage son, Abraham II "Jack", died in Europe. After serving as minister, Lincoln returned to private life as a lawyer.

== Later life and career ==
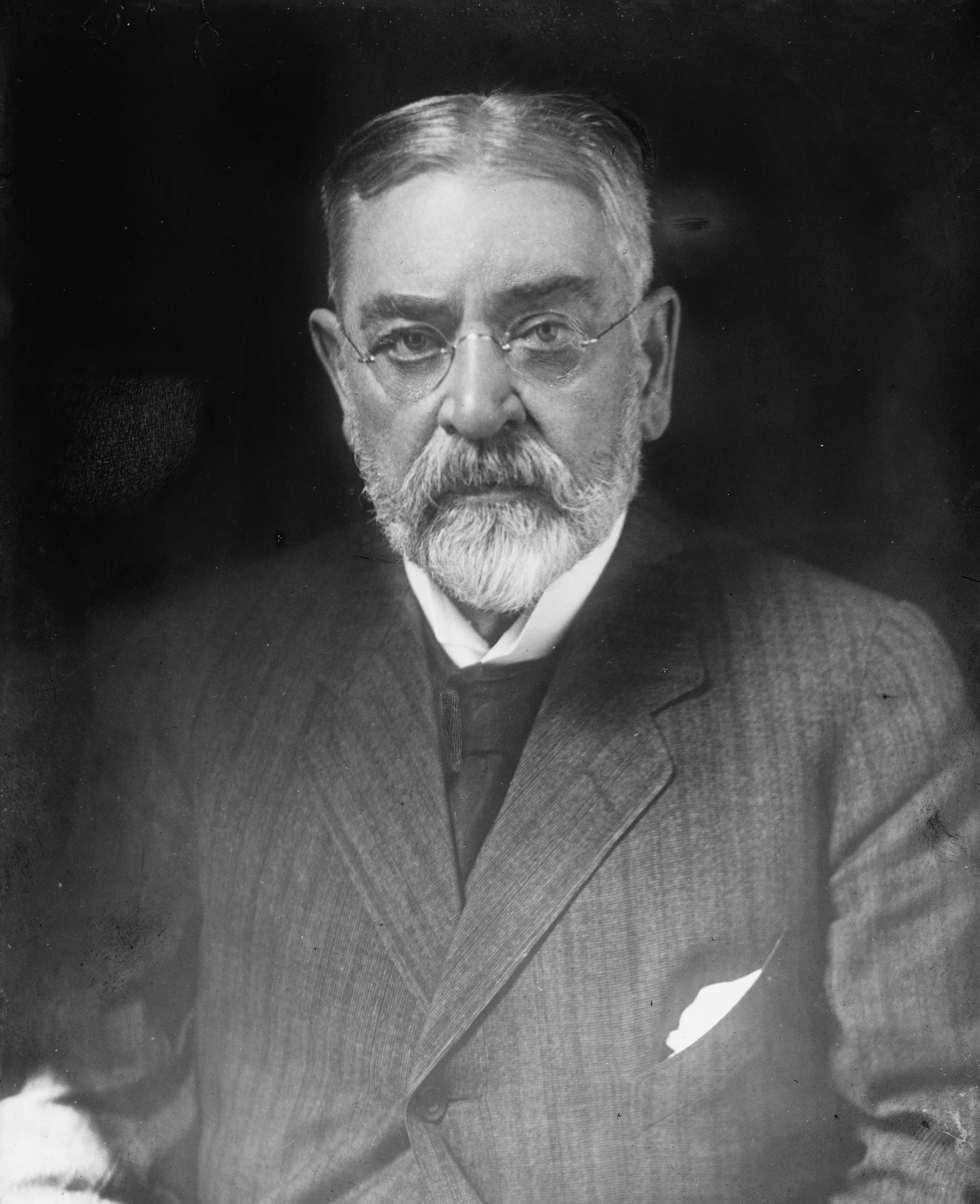
Portrait by Harris & Ewing, 1915

Lincoln fought to preserve and protect his father's legacy, clashing with Abraham Lincoln biographer William Herndon over Herndon's statements about his father. As a result of their confrontations over his Lincoln biography, in 1890 Herndon wrote to Jesse Weik, his Lincoln biography collaborator, that Robert was "a Todd and not a Lincoln ... a little bitter fellow of the pig-headed kind, silly and cold and selfish."

Lincoln was general counsel of the Pullman Palace Car Company under George Pullman, and was named president after Pullman's death in 1897. According to Almont Lindsey's 1942 book, The Pullman Strike, Lincoln arranged to have Pullman quietly excused from the subpoena issued for him to testify in the 1895 conspiracy trials of the American Railway Union's leaders (during the 1894 Pullman Strike). Pullman hid from the deputy marshal sent to his office with the subpoena and then appeared with Lincoln to meet privately with Judge Grosscup after the jury had been dismissed. In 1911, Lincoln became chairman of the Pullman Company board, a position he held until 1924.

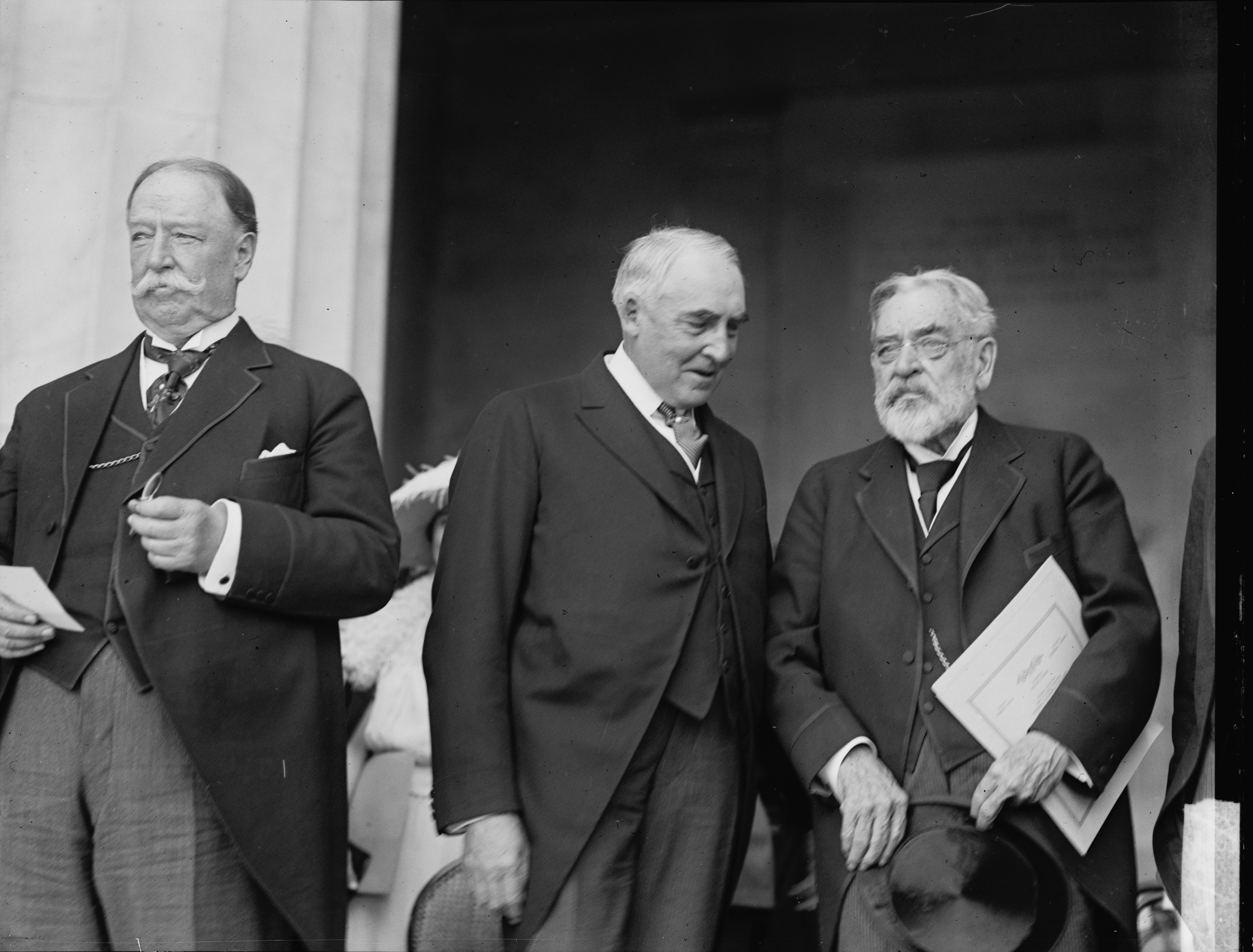
Chief Justice William Howard Taft (left), President Warren G. Harding (center) and Lincoln at the dedication of the Lincoln Memorial, May 30, 1922

A serious nonprofessional astronomer, Lincoln had an observatory built at Hildene, and a 1909 Warner & Swasey refracting telescope with a six-inch John A. Brashear objective lens was installed. Lincoln's telescope and observatory have been restored and it was used by a local astronomy club in the early 2000s. Lincoln was also a dedicated golfer, and served as president of the Ekwanok Country Club in Manchester. His last public appearance was on May 30, 1922, at the dedication ceremony for his father's memorial in Washington, D.C.

== Presence at assassinations ==
Robert Lincoln was coincidentally either present or nearby when three presidential assassinations occurred.

- Lincoln was not present at Ford's Theatre when his father was assassinated, but he was at the White House nearby, and rushed to be with his parents. The president was moved to the Petersen House after the shooting, where Robert attended his father's deathbed.
- Lincoln was an eyewitness when Charles J. Guiteau shot President James A. Garfield at the Sixth Street Train Station in Washington, D.C., on July 2, 1881. Lincoln was Garfield's Secretary of War at the time.
- Lincoln was at the 1901 Pan-American Exposition in Buffalo, New York, when President William McKinley was shot by Leon Czolgosz. Though not an eyewitness, he was just outside the Temple of Music when the shooting occurred.

Lincoln himself recognized these coincidences. He is said to have refused a later presidential invitation with the comment, "No, I'm not going, and they'd better not ask me, because there is a certain fatality about presidential functions when I am present."

== Death ==
Lincoln died in his sleep at his Vermont home Hildene on July 26, 1926, six days before his 83rd birthday. His physician listed the cause of death as a "cerebral hemorrhage induced by arteriosclerosis". Lincoln's body was stored in the receiving vault at Dellwood Cemetery from July 1926 until March 1928, when arrangements were made to inter his remains at Arlington National Cemetery.

Lincoln had long expressed his intention to be buried in the Lincoln Tomb with his family at the Oak Ridge Cemetery in Springfield. However, two weeks after his death, his widow Mary Harlan Lincoln wrote to her husband's niece of an inspired thought: "Our darling was a personage, made his own history, independently of his great father, and should have his own place 'in the sun'".

Lincoln's body was buried at Arlington National Cemetery in a sarcophagus designed by sculptor James Earle Fraser. He is buried together with his wife Mary and their son Abraham II ("Jack"), who had died in London of sepsis in 1890 at age 16. Weeks after Jack's death, Robert wrote to his cousin Charles Edwards, "We had a long & most anxious struggle and at times had hopes of saving our boy. It would have been done if it had depended only on his own marvelous pluck & patience now that the end has come, there is a great blank in our future lives & an affliction not to be measured."

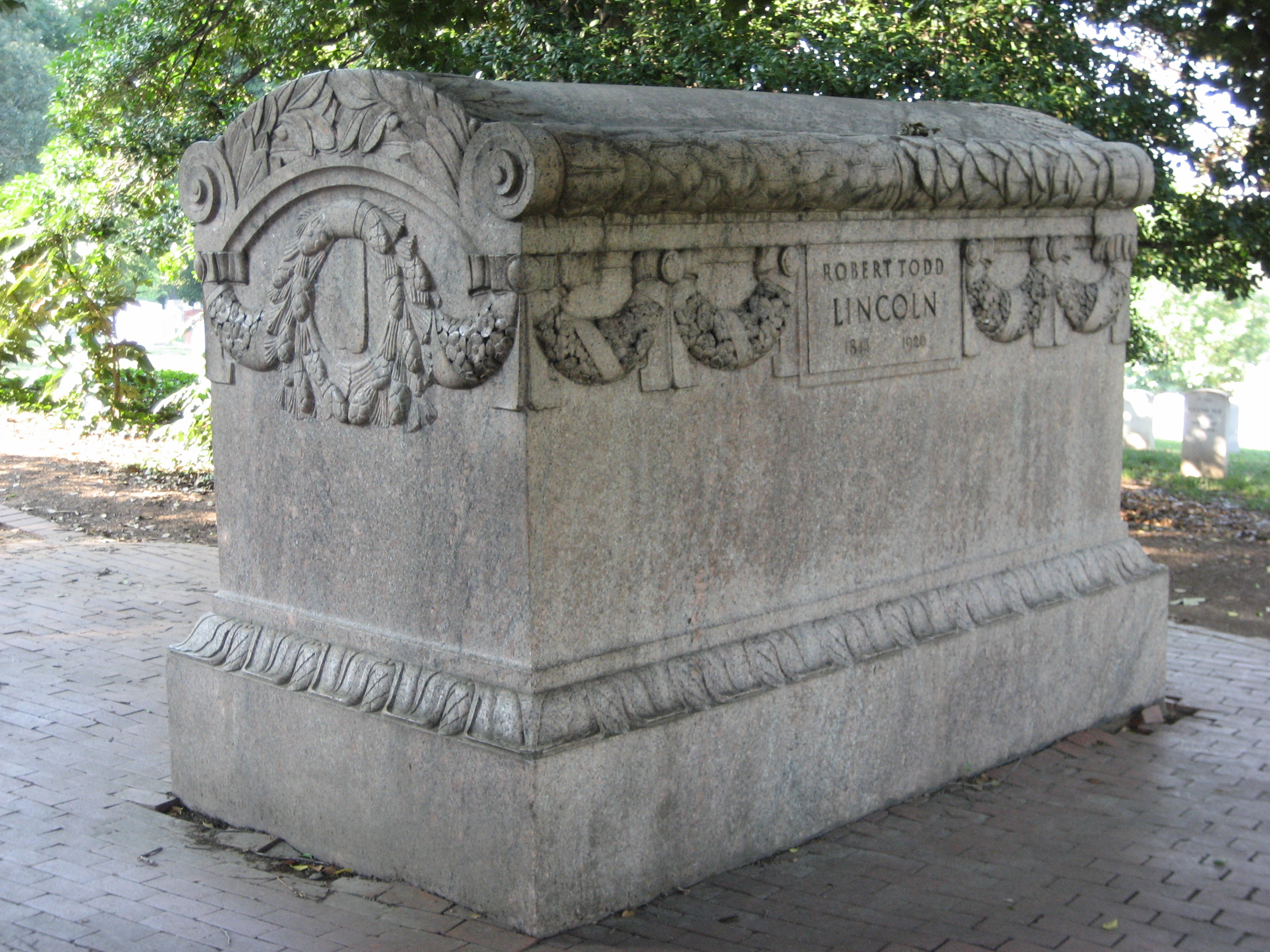
Lincoln's sarcophagus at Arlington National Cemetery

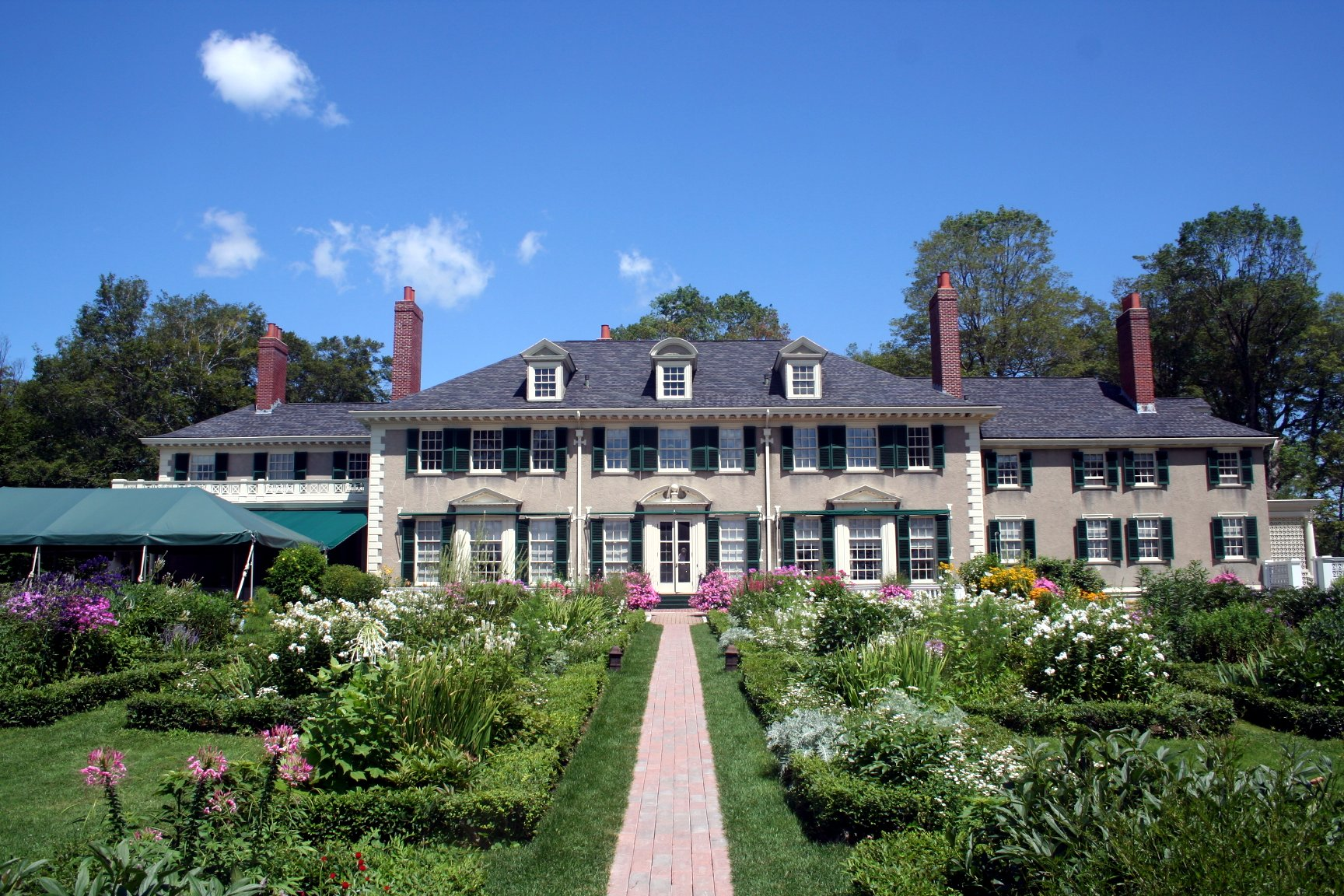
Robert Todd Lincoln's mansion Hildene in Manchester, Vermont

== Legacy ==
Historian Michael Burlingame considered Robert Todd Lincoln to be "a particularly unfortunate, even tragic figure." Lincoln himself once said, "No one wanted me for Secretary of War... For minister to England... For president of the Pullman Company; they wanted Abraham Lincoln's son." Nevertheless, he accepted the appointments and was very well-paid, becoming a millionaire lawyer and businessman, fond of the pleasures of the wealthy conservative Victorian gentlemen of his social circle.

Lincoln is considered to have had little in common with his father personally or politically, not being humorous or unpretentious, but rather cold, stuffy, and aloof. Fanny Seward, daughter of secretary of state William H. Seward, described him, however, as "ready and easy in conversation having, I fancy, considerable humor in his disposition...agreeable, good-natured, and intelligent".

Lincoln was the last surviving member of the Garfield and Arthur Cabinets, and the last-surviving witness of Lee's surrender at Appomattox. The Lincoln Sea, a body of water in the Arctic Ocean between Canada and Greenland, was named after then Secretary of War Lincoln on Adolphus Greely's 1881–1884 Arctic expedition.

Lincoln's last known surviving descendant, Robert Todd Lincoln Beckwith, died on December 24, 1985.

== In popular culture ==
Robert Todd Lincoln as a character has appeared many times on film, in television programs, and in dramatic productions.

=== Films ===
- Edwin Mills in Abe Lincoln in Illinois (1940)
- Joseph Gordon-Levitt in Steven Spielberg's Lincoln (2012)

=== Television ===
- Kieran Mulroney in Tad (1995)
- Gregory Cooke in the miniseries Lincoln (1988)
- Wil Wheaton in The Day Lincoln Was Shot (1998)
- Brett Dalton in Killing Lincoln (2013)
- Neal Bledsoe in Timeless (2016)
- James Carroll Jordan in Sandburg's Lincoln (1974), with Hal Holbrook as Abraham Lincoln.
- Nick Robinson in History of the World, Part II (2023)
- Maxwell Korn in Manhunt (2024)
- Kyle Soller in Death by Lightning (2025)

=== Stage plays ===
- Michael Cristofer in The Last of Mrs. Lincoln (1976). The Last of Mrs. Lincoln, starring Julie Harris, was also seen on television, on PBS as part of a series called Hollywood Television Theater.

== See also ==
- List of people on the cover of Time Magazine: 1920s – March 8, 1926
- Lincoln family tree

Political offices
| Preceded by Alexander Ramsey | U.S. Secretary of War; Served under: James A. Garfield and Chester A. Arthur; 1881–1885 | Succeeded by William C. Endicott |
Diplomatic posts
| Preceded by Edward J. Phelps | U.S. Minister to Great Britain; 1889–1893 | Succeeded by Thomas F. Bayard as Ambassador |
