= Mary Harlan Lincoln =

Wife of Robert T. Lincoln

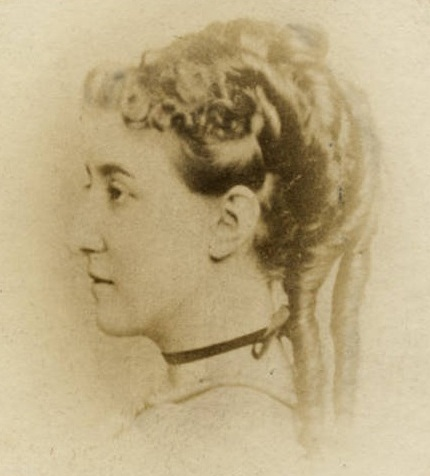
- Born: Mary Eunice Harlan; September 25, 1846; Iowa City, Iowa, U.S.
- Died: March 31, 1937 (aged 90); Washington, D.C., U.S.
- Spouse: Robert Todd Lincoln (m. 1868; died 1926)
- Children: Mamie; Abraham II; Jessie
- Parents: Ann Eliza Peck; James Harlan

Mary Harlan Lincoln (September 25, 1846 – March 31, 1937) was the daughter of United States Senator James Harlan and the wife of Robert Todd Lincoln.

== Life and family ==
The eldest child of James Harlan and Ann Eliza Peck, Mary Eunice Harlan was born in Iowa City, Iowa, on September 25, 1846. The only one of James Harlan's children to live to adulthood, she was raised in Mount Pleasant, Iowa, and Washington, D.C. She was educated in Mount Pleasant and at Madame Smith's Finishing School in Washington. In addition to learning French, dancing and deportment, Mary Harlan received training in music and became an accomplished harpist.

Robert Lincoln noticed the teenaged Mary in 1864 and began to court her. She had also come to the attention of Robert's mother Mary Lincoln, who approved and attempted to play matchmaker. President Abraham Lincoln became aware of his wife's activities and aided her by asking Senator Harlan to escort Mrs. Lincoln to Lincoln's 1865 presidential inaugural, enabling Robert to escort Mary Harlan. In order to keep their courtship secret, Robert Lincoln often used the assistance of his friend Edgar Welles to meet Mary Harlan at the home of Edgar's father Secretary of the Navy Gideon Welles. Their marriage was delayed by the assassination of Robert's father and the subsequent mourning period.

=== Marriage and children ===
Robert Todd Lincoln and Mary Eunice Harlan were married on September 24, 1868. They had two daughters and one son:

- Mary "Mamie" Lincoln (October 15, 1869 – November 21, 1938)
- Abraham Lincoln II (nicknamed "Jack"; August 14, 1873 – March 5, 1890)
- Jessie Harlan Lincoln (November 6, 1875 – January 4, 1948).

In an era before air conditioning, Robert, Mary and the children would often leave the hot city life behind in summer for the cooler climate of Mt. Pleasant, Iowa. During the 1880s the family would "summer" at the Harlan home. The Harlan-Lincoln home, built in 1876, still stands today. Donated by Mary Harlan Lincoln to Iowa Wesleyan College in 1907, it now serves as a museum with many artifacts from the Lincoln family and from Abraham Lincoln's presidency.

For a time Mary Todd Lincoln lived with Robert and Mary Lincoln, but the two women apparently did not get along, and Mary Todd Lincoln moved out, eventually being committed by Robert to Bellevue Place, a private sanitarium in Batavia, Illinois in May 1875. Some sources indicate that Mary Harlan Lincoln may have been an alcoholic, which negatively affected her relationship with her mother in law, husband and children. The available information is circumstantial, and this question has not been resolved with certainty.

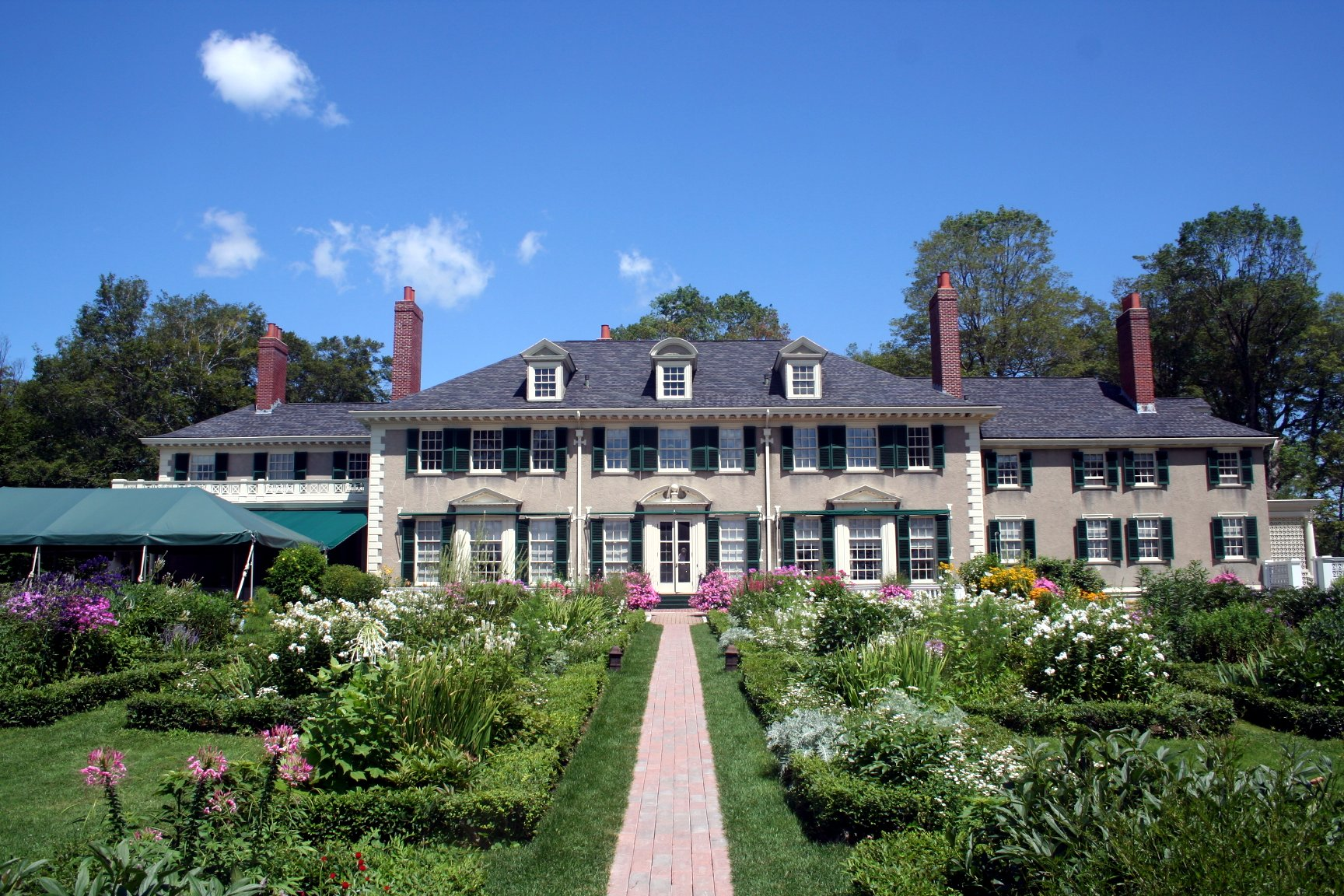
Robert and Mary Harlan Lincoln's mansion, Hildene, in Manchester, Vermont

Robert Lincoln pursued a successful career in law, business and politics, serving as Secretary of War from 1881 to 1885 under Presidents James A. Garfield and Chester A. Arthur. The Lincolns lived in London, England for a period of time as Robert served as United States Ambassador to the United Kingdom from 1889 to 1893 under President Benjamin Harrison. Afterwards, he returned to practicing law. Made quite wealthy by his law practice, which included General Counsel to, and later President of, the Pullman Palace Car Company the Lincolns lived at homes in Chicago, Washington, and Hildene in Manchester, Vermont.

By all accounts, Mary Harlan Lincoln was intensely private, and worked diligently to keep herself out of the public eye and prevent herself from being photographed. In addition to managing the family households, she was responsible for her husband's estate after his death in July 1926. She also oversaw charitable bequests and family trusts before her death. Mary Harlan Lincoln died in Washington on March 31, 1937. She was buried with her husband and son Jack at Arlington National Cemetery, Section 31.
