= Outline of Abraham Lincoln =

Overview of and topical guide to Abraham Lincoln

The following outline is provided as an overview of and topical guide to Abraham Lincoln:

Abraham Lincoln – 16th President of the United States, serving from March 4, 1861, until his assassination in April 1865. Lincoln led the United States through its Civil War—its bloodiest war and its greatest moral, constitutional, and political crisis. In doing so, he preserved the Union, abolished slavery, strengthened the federal government, and modernized the economy.

== Political career of Abraham Lincoln ==
=== Political philosophy of Abraham Lincoln ===
- United States Declaration of Independence – while this document was instrumental in the founding of the United States, it was also a statement of human rights, most notably through the phrase that "all men are created equal". Abraham Lincoln made the document the centerpiece of his rhetoric (as in the Gettysburg Address of 1863), and his policies. He considered it to be the foundation of his political philosophy and argued that the Declaration is a statement of principles through which the United States Constitution should be interpreted.
- Abraham Lincoln and slavery

=== Electoral history of Abraham Lincoln ===
Electoral history of Abraham Lincoln

- Campaigning for Congress (1843)
- Campaigning for Henry Clay (1844)
- Campaigning for Congress (1846)
- Republican National Convention, 1856
- United States Senate election (Illinois), 1858 – Abraham Lincoln was the Republican Party candidate and ran against incumbent Stephen Douglas of the Democratic Party. Stephen Douglas remained Senator, but the debates between the two propelled the popularity of Lincoln and acquired for him a national reputation, which helped him to be chosen as the Republican candidate for president in 1860.
  - Lincoln–Douglas debates of 1858 – held publicly in 7 towns, they drew especially large numbers of people from neighboring states, as the issue of slavery was of monumental importance to citizens everywhere in the nation. The debates were covered in complete detail in newspapers across the country.
- Republican National Convention, 1860
- 1860 United States presidential election
  - 1860 campaign song
- Republican National Convention, 1864
  - National Union Party
- 1864 United States presidential election

=== Offices held by Abraham Lincoln prior to his presidency ===
- Illinois Legislature, 1834–1842
- House of Representatives (1847–1849)

=== Presidency of Abraham Lincoln ===
Presidency of Abraham Lincoln

==== Events during Abraham Lincoln's presidency ====
- First inauguration of Abraham Lincoln
  - Perpetual Union
  - Lincoln Bible
- Second inauguration of Abraham Lincoln
  - Baltimore Plot
- American Civil War
  - Origins of the American Civil War
  - Alexander Stephens' Cornerstone Speech
  - Proclamation 80
  - Confiscation Acts
  - Revenue Act of 1861
  - Origin of the Anaconda Plan
  - RMS Trent Affair
  - Habeas Corpus Suspension Act 1863
  - Emancipation Proclamation
  - Separation of West Virginia from Virginia
  - Overland Campaign strategy – Lieutenant General Ulysses S. Grant and President Abraham Lincoln devised a coordinated strategy that would strike at the heart of the Confederacy from multiple directions. This was the first time the Union armies would have a coordinated offensive strategy across a number of theaters.
  - Hampton Roads Conference
  - Evacuation and Capture of Richmond
  - Lincoln's presidential Reconstruction
- Thirteenth Amendment to the United States Constitution – the amendment that abolished slavery
- Dakota War of 1862
  - Department of the Northwest
- Homestead Act of 1862
- National Bank Act
- Lincoln's Thanksgiving proclamation – in 1863, Lincoln proclaimed Thanksgiving to be a national holiday, and set it as the last Thursday in November. It has remained thus ever since.
- Birchard Letter
- Bixby letter
- Formation of the National Academy of Sciences – the NAS was founded in 1863 by an Act of Congress, and signed into existence by President Lincoln.
- United States Department of Agriculture § Formation
- 1863 State of the Union Address
- 1864 State of the Union Address

==== Assassination of Abraham Lincoln ====
- Assassination of Abraham Lincoln
- Funeral and burial of Abraham Lincoln
  - Lincoln catafalque

=== Abraham Lincoln's notable speeches ===
- Lyceum address (1838)
- Peoria speech (1854)
- "Lost Speech" (1856)
- House Divided speech (1858)
- Lincoln-Douglas debates (1858)
- Cooper Union Address (1860)
- Farewell Address (1861)
- First inaugural address (1861)
- Gettysburg Address (1863 event) – this speech was delivered by Lincoln during the American Civil War, four and a half months after the Union victory at the Battle of Gettysburg. In his address, Lincoln reiterated the principles of human equality espoused by the Declaration of Independence and proclaimed the Civil War as a struggle for the preservation of the Union sundered by the secession crisis, with "a new birth of freedom" that would bring true equality to all of its citizens. Lincoln also redefined the Civil War as a struggle not just for the Union, but also for the principle of human equality.
- Second inaugural address (1865)

== Personal life of Abraham Lincoln ==
- Early life and career of Abraham Lincoln
- Abraham Lincoln in the Black Hawk War
- Matson Trial
- Spot Resolutions
- Abraham Lincoln's patent
- Hurd v. Rock Island Bridge Co.
- Baltimore Plot
- Lincoln's beard
- Medical and mental health of Abraham Lincoln
- Poetry of Abraham Lincoln
- Religious views of Abraham Lincoln
- Sexuality of Abraham Lincoln
- Abraham Lincoln and slavery

=== Family of Abraham Lincoln ===
Lincoln family

- Mary Todd Lincoln (wife)
- Robert Todd Lincoln (son)
- Edward Baker Lincoln (son)
- William Wallace Lincoln (son)
- Thomas "Tad" Lincoln (son)
- Mary Todd "Mamie" Lincoln (granddaughter)
- Abraham Lincoln II (grandson)
- Jessie Lincoln (granddaughter)
- Thomas Lincoln (father)
- Nancy Hanks Lincoln (mother)
- Sarah Bush Lincoln (stepmother)
- Sarah Lincoln Grigsby (sister)
- Abraham Lincoln (paternal grandfather)
- Mordecai Lincoln (paternal uncle)
- Mary Lincoln Crume (paternal aunt)
- John Hanks (maternal cousin)
- Joseph Hanks (great-grandfather)
- Samuel Lincoln (17th-century ancestor)
- Mary Lincoln Beckwith (great-granddaughter)
- Robert Todd Lincoln Beckwith (great-grandson)
- Timothy Lincoln Beckwith (great-great-grandson)

=== Homes and places ===
- Lincoln Trail Homestead State Memorial
- Lincoln's New Salem
- Lincoln Home National Historic Site
- Lincoln Pioneer Village
- Little Pigeon Creek Community
- Cottage at the Soldier's Home
- Lincoln Bedroom
- Lincoln Sitting Room
- Ford's Theatre
- Petersen House
- Lincoln Tomb

== Abraham Lincoln's legacy ==
- Abraham Lincoln National Heritage Area
- Abraham Lincoln Presidential Library and Museum
- Bibliography of Abraham Lincoln
- Lincoln Highway
- The Papers of Abraham Lincoln
  - Lincoln/Net
- List of photographs of Abraham Lincoln
- Lincoln Prize
- Great Moments with Mr. Lincoln

=== Cultural depictions of Abraham Lincoln ===
Cultural depictions of Abraham Lincoln

- Abraham Lincoln on U.S. postage stamps
- Lincoln's image on money
  - Lincoln cent
  - List of presidents of the United States on currency § Abraham Lincoln
- Films about Lincoln
  - Abraham Lincoln (1924)
  - The Dramatic Life of Abraham Lincoln (1924)
  - Abraham Lincoln (1930)
  - Young Mr. Lincoln (1939)
  - Abe Lincoln in Illinois (1940)
  - The Face of Lincoln (1955)
  - Lincoln (2012)
  - Killing Lincoln (2013)

=== Memorials to and monuments of Abraham Lincoln ===
Memorials to Abraham Lincoln

- Abraham Lincoln (Healy painting)
- Lincoln's Birthday
- Lincoln Memorial
  - Abraham Lincoln (French, 1920)
  - Lincoln Memorial Reflecting Pool
- Abraham Lincoln Birthplace National Historical Park
  - Knob Creek Farm
- Lincoln Boyhood National Memorial
- Mount Rushmore
- Lincoln, Nebraska
- Lincoln Park
- Lincoln State Park
- Lincoln Trail State Memorial
- The Peacemakers painting

==== Statues of Abraham Lincoln ====
- Abraham Lincoln: The Man
- Statue of Abraham Lincoln (Lincoln, Nebraska)
- Statue of Abraham Lincoln (District of Columbia City Hall)
- Abraham Lincoln (Lincoln Memorial)
- Lincoln the Lawyer statue
- Abraham Lincoln Statue (Kentucky)
- Young Abe Lincoln (1962)
- Abraham Lincoln: The Head of State
- Abraham Lincoln: The Man statue
- Statue of Abraham Lincoln (Milwaukee)

=== Curiosities ===
- Lincoln's ghost
- Lincoln–Kennedy coincidences urban legend

== Publications about Abraham Lincoln ==
Bibliography of Abraham Lincoln

- Abraham Lincoln
- Abraham Lincoln's World
- Abraham Lincoln, Friend of the People
- Abraham Lincoln: A History
- Abraham Lincoln: The War Years
- Assassination Vacation
- Forced into Glory
- I Am Abraham Lincoln
- Killing Lincoln
- Lincoln and Darwin
- Lincoln and the Power of the Press: The War for Public Opinion
- Lincoln at Gettysburg
- Lincoln the Unknown
- Lincoln Unmasked
- Team of Rivals: The Political Genius of Abraham Lincoln
- The Fate of Liberty
- The Fiery Trial: Abraham Lincoln and American Slavery
- The Lincoln Conspiracy
- Why Lincoln Matters

== Organizations concerning Abraham Lincoln ==
- Abraham Lincoln Association
- Abraham Lincoln Institute

== See also ==
- Outline of the American Civil War
