= Lincoln poems =

Lincoln poems may refer to:

- Poetry of Abraham Lincoln
- Poetry on Abraham Lincoln
  - Walt Whitman's poems on Abraham Lincoln
