= Lincoln/Net =

Digital history project archiving documents relating to Abraham Lincoln and Illinois

Lincoln/Net is a digital history project created by the Abraham Lincoln Historical Digitization Project, based at Northern Illinois University in DeKalb, Illinois. It preserves (in digital format) and provides access to primary documents relating to Lincoln's time in Illinois (1830–1861) as well as documents from the early years of Illinois' statehood. The historical materials include books, manuscripts, images, speeches, writings, and other types of documents. Over 30,000,000 words of searchable text and over 3,000 audio/visual artifacts exist. These items are supplemented by biographical information and historical interpretations.

The archive materials can be accessed in a variety of ways. They are searchable using the site's search tool or you can browse by type of document. They have also been arranged thematically by the project staff, allowing users to explore a particular topic of interest. The themes included are: frontier settlement; Native American relations; economic development; women's experience and gender roles; African-Americans' experience and American racial attitudes; law and society; religion and culture; and political development. Each of these themes is accompanied by an essay which provides historical context and interpretation for the associated documents.

This project brought together and digitized materials from the University of Chicago, the Newberry Library, the Chicago Historical Society, Illinois State University, the Illinois State Archives, Lewis University, and Knox College. The project was completed collaboratively by a large group of people, including nearly 80 student assistants. Drew E. VandeCreek is the Project Director.
