= Lincoln and Darwin =

2010 book by James Lander

Lincoln and Darwin: Shared Visions of Race, Science, and Religion
- Author: James Lander
- Language: English
- Subject: Abraham Lincoln and Charles Darwin
- Published: 2010 (Southern Illinois University Press)
- Publication place: United States
- Media type: Print
- Pages: 351
- ISBN: 9780809329908
- OCLC: 456977452

Lincoln and Darwin: Shared Visions of Race, Science, and Religion is a 2010 book by James Lander about the lives and views of Abraham Lincoln and Charles Darwin.

== Overview ==
Abraham Lincoln and Charles Darwin were born on the same day, February 12, 1809. Both lost their mother at a young age and, despite their differences in upbringing, both men saw themselves as autodidacts. Lander argues that they also shared an interest in science and a skeptical approach to religion. Darwin closely followed the events of the American Civil War and wanted Lincoln and the Union to prevail, but it is unlikely that Lincoln read Darwin's work.

Lincoln and Darwin is structured as a series of alternating narratives concerning each man's interactions with the events and discoveries of the mid-19th century. Lander explores similarities in the intellectual development, concerns, and impacts of Abraham Lincoln and Charles Darwin, focusing in particular on the issue of slavery in the United States, which both men influentially opposed. Lander's broader argument is that Lincoln and Darwin shared the same outlook on the central issues of race, science, and religion. He also looks at the relationship between science and race in the 19th century United States and the emergence and influence of scientific racism. Lander situates Lincoln and Darwin against their respective opponents: Stephen A. Douglas, Lincoln's rival in Illinois politics, and Louis Agassiz, an advocate of polygenism.

== Critical reception ==
Tom Allen, in The Journal of the Civil War Era, wrote that Lincoln and Darwin "is not always completely convincing" with regard to the "shared vision" Lander identifies, but concluded that the book "is well worth reading. The prose is delightfully lucid, and the parallel account of two lives so apparently different provides a fresh perspective on the intellectual culture of the nineteenth century."

Jean H. Baker, writing in Civil War History, described Lincoln and Darwin as "a profound comparison of the two men's perspectives and ... a worthy addition to the numerous individual studies of either man", and praised Lander for providing a new means of understanding and appreciating each man.

Steven Conn, in the Reports of the National Center for Science Education, noted that Lander's comparisons occasionally appear "a little strained", but that "more often than not these comparisons and juxtapositions persuade"; and praised in particular Lander's analysis of the interactions between race and science.

Stephen L. Hansen, in the Journal of the Illinois State Historical Society, criticized Lander's "optimistic and sentimental view" of Lincoln's attitudes on race, but praised the book's "readable style" and concluded "This is a book that should be read, discussed, and enjoyed."

Mark Largent, writing in Isis described Lincoln and Darwin as "a strange project", but nonetheless "quite engaging because it allows Lander to bring into focus broad questions about the relationship between individuals and their contexts as well as some specific questions about mid-nineteenth-century Western thought."

David Turley, writing in American Nineteenth Century History, observed that the book contains little original research and questioned the coherence of its themes "applied to Lincoln and Darwin together", but praised "Lander's lucid, succinct, and up-to-date accounts of the topics that he deploys to illustrate his protagonists' involvement with his three main themes."

== See also ==
- Between Heaven and Hell, a novel by Peter Kreeft about a fictional discussion in purgatory among John F. Kennedy, C.S. Lewis, and Aldous Huxley, all of whom died on November 22, 1963.
