= Don H. Doyle =

American historian

Don Harrison Doyle is an American historian. He specializes in Civil War history and historiography. He is best known for his books Faulkner's County: The Historical Roots of Yoknapatawpha and The Cause of All Nations: An International History of the American Civil War.

== Life and career ==
He completed his BA at the University of California, Davis, and his PhD at Northwestern University. Doyle is retired as a Professor of History at the University of South Carolina.

He has spent several years teaching and researching in Europe and Latin America. He is also a Public Policy Scholar at the Woodrow Wilson International Center for Scholars. He was appointed a Fellow of the National Humanities Center in Research Triangle Park, North Carolina.

== Bibliography ==
- Nashville Since the 1920s (1985).
- Nashville in the New South, 1880–1930 (1985).
- New Men, New Cities, New South: Atlanta, Nashville, Charleston, Mobile, 1860–1910 (1990).
- The Social Order of a Frontier Community: Jacksonville, Illinois, 1825–70 (1990).
- The South as an American Problem (1996). Co-edited with Larry J. Griffin.
- Faulkner's County: The Historical Roots of Yoknapatawpha (2001).
- Nationalism in the New World (2006). Co-edited with Marco Antonio Pamplona.
- Nations Divided: America, Italy, and the Southern Question (2002).
- Secession as an International Phenomenon: From America's Civil War to Contemporary Separatist Movements (2010).
- "Widely Noted and Long Remembered: The Gettysburg Address Around the World", in Sean Conant, ed., The Gettysburg Address: Perspectives on Lincoln's Greatest Speech (2015).
- The Cause of All Nations: An International History of the American Civil War (2015). Review by Fergus M. Bordewich.
- The Age of Reconstruction: How Lincoln's New Birth of Freedom Remade the World (2024). Review by Fergus M. Bordewich.
