= Poetry of Abraham Lincoln =

Poetry written by Abraham Lincoln

The poetry of Abraham Lincoln has been an interesting source into Lincoln's psyche. In addition to two complete, narrative poems, Lincoln wrote several small verses throughout his life and possibly a poem in the form of a suicide note.

== "My Childhood-Home I See Again" ==
In 1846, Lincoln completed the composition of one of his most serious poems, which dealt with his emotions upon visiting his childhood home. It is divided into two cantos. The first section was mailed to Lincoln's friend and fellow politician, Andrew Johnston, on April 18, 1846. The second was mailed on September 6, 1846. On May 5, 1847, Johnston published both cantos in the Quincy Whig and titled it as "The Return." The first canto was dubbed "Part I – Reflection," and the second, "Part II – The Maniac."

== "The Bear Hunt" ==
When Johnston asked permission to publish "My Childhood-Home I See Again," Lincoln offered to have the third canto published along with it. The third section was included in his February 25, 1847 letter. Johnston did not feel that the final canto fit with the rest of the poem so he did not publish it. The third section is known as a separate piece titled "The Bear Hunt." A transcript of entire poem can be found here.

== "The Suicide's Soliloquy" ==
One of the more interesting poems attributed to Lincoln is "The Suicide's Soliloquy." It was found in the August 25, 1838 issue of the Sangamo Journal of Springfield, Illinois by Richard Lawrence Miller in 1997. After studying the text and concluding that the poem was composed by Lincoln, he announced his discovery in a 2004 newsletter of the Abraham Lincoln Association. Lincoln scholars are still split on the authenticity of the poem. The poem is in the form of a suicide note, written by a man about to kill himself on the banks of the Sangamo River. Lincoln's well known depression gives some scholars cause to believe that he would write such a poem, even if he personally had no intentions to commit suicide. Miller states that the poem fits the meter, syntax, diction, and tone of Lincoln's other works.

Lincoln had expressed suicidal thoughts to his friend Joshua Speed on two separate occasions at the ages of twenty-six and thirty-one. Speed had told Lincoln's biographer, William Herndon, that Lincoln had published a poem in 1838. Going off information from Herndon's research, it was concluded that the poem was published in the summer of 1841, coinciding with the time of Lincoln's "fatal first of January" breakdown.

== Short Verses ==
Around the time when Lincoln was fifteen or seventeen, he wrote a few short poems in his arithmetic book but they are not very substantial:

Abraham Lincoln is my nam[e]
And with my pen I wrote the same
I wrote in both hast and speed
and left it here for fools to read

After his compositions of 1846, Lincoln continued to write poetry. Such poems include the short piece dedicated to Linnie Haggard, daughter of the owner of a hotel where Lincoln stayed in Winchester, Illinois, dated September 30, 1858:

To Linnie—
A sweet plaintive song did I hear,
And I fancied that she was the singer—
May emotions as pure, as that song set a-stir
Be the worst that the future shall bring her.
