= Spot Resolutions =

Work by Abraham Lincoln

- The first page of Lincoln's handwritten resolutions (December 22, 1847).
- Long title: Resolutions requesting the President to inform the House of the true location of the "spot" where American blood was shed
- Introduced by: Abraham Lincoln
- Status: Unknown

The spot resolutions were offered in the United States House of Representatives on 22 December 1847 by future President Abraham Lincoln, then a Whig representative from Illinois. The resolutions requested President James K. Polk to provide Congress with the exact location (the "spot") upon which blood was spilled on American soil, as Polk had claimed in 1846 when asking Congress to declare war on Mexico. Lincoln's persistence in pushing his "spot resolutions" led some to begin referring to him as "spotty Lincoln." Lincoln's resolutions were a direct challenge to the validity of the president's words, and representative of an ongoing political power struggle between Whigs and Democrats.

Eight resolutions sought specific information. The first: "whether the spot on which the blood of our citizens was shed, as in his messages declared, was or was not within the territory of Spain, at least after the treaty of 1819, until the Mexican revolution." The second: "whether that spot is or is not within the territory which was wrested from Spain by the revolutionary Government of Mexico." The other six resolutions extended the analysis to determine whether the territory on which the casualties occurred was ever under the government or laws of Texas or of the United States. The House of Representatives never acted on Lincoln's resolutions, but they demonstrated the Whig reluctance to accept President Polk's grounds to begin the war.

Lincoln's handwritten 'Spot' Resolutions submitted to the U.S. House of Representatives on December 22, 1847, RG 233, Entry 362: Thirtieth Congress, National Archives Building, Washington, DC

According to Lincoln biographer David Herbert Donald, "nobody paid much attention to his resolutions, which the House neither debated nor adopted". Many Democrats regarded the resolutions as unpatriotic; some Whigs cautioned that criticism of the war would hurt the Whigs politically. The Whigs would later nominate Zachary Taylor (a hero of the war) as their candidate, whom Lincoln supported.

The location where the initial bloodshed (known as the Thornton Affair) occurred in April 1846 is located in present-day Cameron County, Texas, just north of the Rio Grande which represented the American claim for Texas's boundary with Mexico (as well as the current international border). The Mexican claim set the boundary at the Nueces River, considerably further north.
