= Abraham Lincoln =

President of the United States from 1861 to 1865

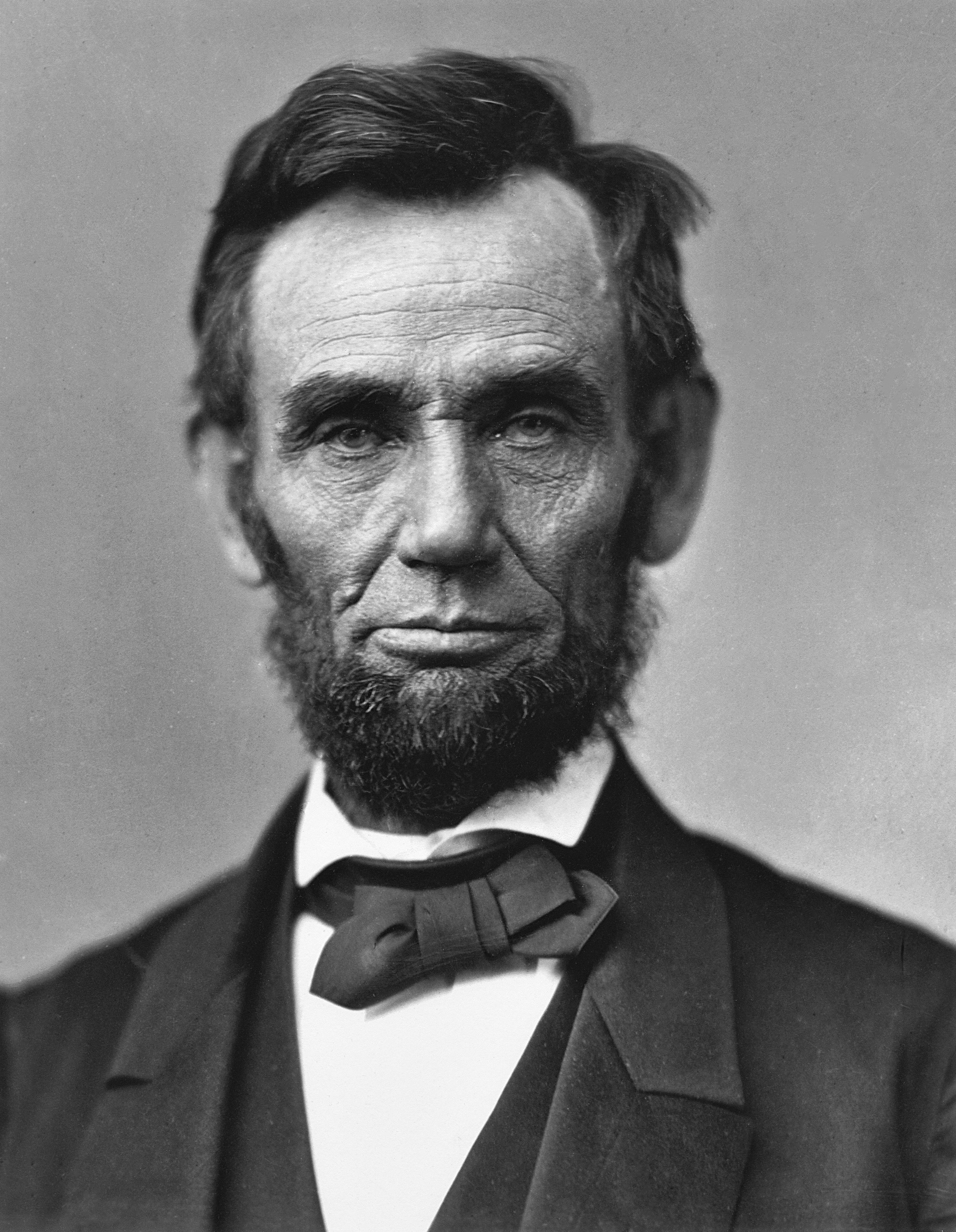
- Lincoln in 1863

16th President of the United States
- In office March 4, 1861 – April 15, 1865
- Vice President: Hannibal Hamlin (1861–1865); Andrew Johnson (Mar–Apr 1865)
- Preceded by: James Buchanan
- Succeeded by: Andrew Johnson

Member of the U.S. House of Representatives from Illinois's 7th district
- In office March 4, 1847 – March 3, 1849
- Preceded by: John Henry
- Succeeded by: Thomas L. Harris

Member of the Illinois House of Representatives from Sangamon County
- In office December 1, 1834 – December 4, 1842
- Preceded by: Achilles Morris
- Succeeded by: Multi member district

Personal details
- Born: February 12, 1809 LaRue County, Kentucky, U.S.
- Died: April 15, 1865 (aged 56) Washington, D.C., U.S.
- Cause of death: Assassination by gunshot
- Resting place: Lincoln Tomb
- Party: Republican (after 1856)
- Other political affiliations: Whig (before 1856); National Union (1864–1865)
- Height: 6 ft 4 in (193 cm)
- Spouse: Mary Todd (m. 1842)
- Children: 4
- Relatives: Lincoln family
- Occupation: Politician; lawyer
- Nickname: "Honest Abe"

Military service
- Allegiance: United States
- Branch/service: Illinois Militia
- Years of service: April–July 1832
- Rank: Captain (Note: Discharged from command-rank of captain and re-enlisted at rank of private); Private
- Battles/wars: Black Hawk War (see Abraham Lincoln in the Black Hawk War)

Abraham Lincoln (Note: /ˈlɪŋkən/ LINK-ən) (February 12, 1809 – April 15, 1865) was the 16th president of the United States, from 1861 until his assassination in 1865. He led the United States through the American Civil War, defeating the Confederacy and playing a major role in the abolition of slavery.

Born in a one-room log cabin in Kentucky, Lincoln was raised on the frontier. He was self-educated and became a lawyer, Illinois state legislator, and U.S. representative. Angered by the Kansas–Nebraska Act of 1854, which opened the territories to slavery, he became a leader of the new Republican Party. He reached a national audience in the 1858 Senate campaign debates against Stephen A. Douglas. Lincoln won the 1860 presidential election, becoming the first Republican president. His victory prompted a majority of the slave states to begin seceding and form the Confederate States. A month after Lincoln assumed the presidency, Confederate forces attacked Fort Sumter, starting the Civil War.

As a moderate Republican, Lincoln had to navigate conflicting political opinions from contentious factions during the war effort. He closely supervised the Union's strategy and tactics, including the selection of generals and the implementation of a naval blockade of Southern ports. He suspended the writ of habeas corpus in April 1861, an action that Chief Justice Roger Taney found in Ex parte Merryman that only Congress could do, and he averted war with Britain by defusing the Trent Affair. On January 1, 1863, he issued the Emancipation Proclamation, which declared the slaves in the states "in rebellion" to be free. On November 19, 1863, he delivered the Gettysburg Address, which became one of the most famous speeches in American history. He promoted the Thirteenth Amendment to the U.S. Constitution, which, in 1865, abolished chattel slavery. Following his re-election in 1864, he sought to heal the war-torn nation through Reconstruction.

On April 14, 1865, five days after the Confederate surrender at Appomattox, Lincoln was fatally shot by John Wilkes Booth at Ford's Theatre in Washington, D.C., becoming the first U.S. president to be assassinated. Lincoln is remembered as a martyr and a national hero for his wartime leadership and for his efforts to preserve the Union and abolish slavery. He is consistently ranked in both popular and scholarly polls as among the greatest presidents in American history.

== Early life and education ==
Born in a one-room log cabin in Kentucky on February 12, 1809, Abraham Lincoln was raised on Sinking Spring Farm and Knob Creek Farm near Hodgenville, Kentucky. The second child of Thomas Lincoln and Nancy Hanks Lincoln, he was a descendant of Samuel Lincoln, an Englishman who emigrated to Massachusetts in 1637 (Abraham Lincoln said that Samuel Lincoln "came from Norwich, England, in 1638".) His paternal grandfather and namesake, Captain Abraham Lincoln, moved the family from Virginia to Kentucky. The captain was killed in a Native American raid in 1786. The family settled in Hardin County, Kentucky, in the early 1800s. Nancy is widely assumed to have been the daughter of Lucy Hanks. Thomas and Nancy married on June 12, 1806, and moved to Elizabethtown, Kentucky. They had three children: Sarah, Abraham, and Thomas Jr., who died as an infant.

Lincoln's father bought multiple farms in Kentucky but could not get clear property titles to any, losing hundreds of acres in legal disputes. In 1816, the family moved to Indiana, where land titles were more reliable. They settled on a forested plot in Little Pigeon Creek Community. In Kentucky and Indiana, Thomas worked as a farmer, cabinetmaker, and carpenter. At various times, he owned farms, livestock, and town lots, appraised estates, and served on county patrols. Thomas and Nancy were members of a Separate Baptist Church, a pious evangelical group whose members largely opposed slavery. Overcoming financial challenges, Thomas obtained clear title to 80 acres (32 ha) in Little Pigeon Creek Community in 1827.

On October 5, 1818, Nancy died from milk sickness, leaving 11-year-old Sarah in charge of the household, which included her father, 9-year-old Abraham, and Nancy's 19-year-old orphan cousin, Dennis Hanks. Thomas married Sarah Bush Johnston, a widow with three children of her own, on December 2, 1819. Abraham became close to his stepmother and called her "Mama". On January 20, 1828, Lincoln's sister died in childbirth, devastating him.

=== Education and move to Illinois ===
Lincoln was largely self-educated. His formal schooling was from itinerant teachers. It included two short stints in Kentucky, where he learned to read, but probably not to write. After moving to Indiana at age seven, he attended school only sporadically, for a total of less than 12 months by age 15. Nevertheless, he was an avid reader and maintained a lifelong interest in learning.

When Lincoln was a teenager his father relied heavily on him for farmwork and for supplementary income, hiring the boy out to area farmers and pocketing the money, as was the custom at the time. When he was somewhat older, Lincoln and some friends took a job carrying goods by flatboat to New Orleans, Louisiana, where the slave markets, according to the historian Michael Burlingame, "would leave an indelible impression on him.... It was the first time, but not the last, that he would be repelled while observing slavery firsthand."

In March 1830, fearing another milk-sickness outbreak, several members of the extended Lincoln family, including Abraham, moved west to Illinois and settled in Macon County. Abraham became increasingly distant from Thomas, in part due to his father's lack of interest in education; he would later refuse to attend his father's deathbed or funeral in 1851.

== Marriage and children ==
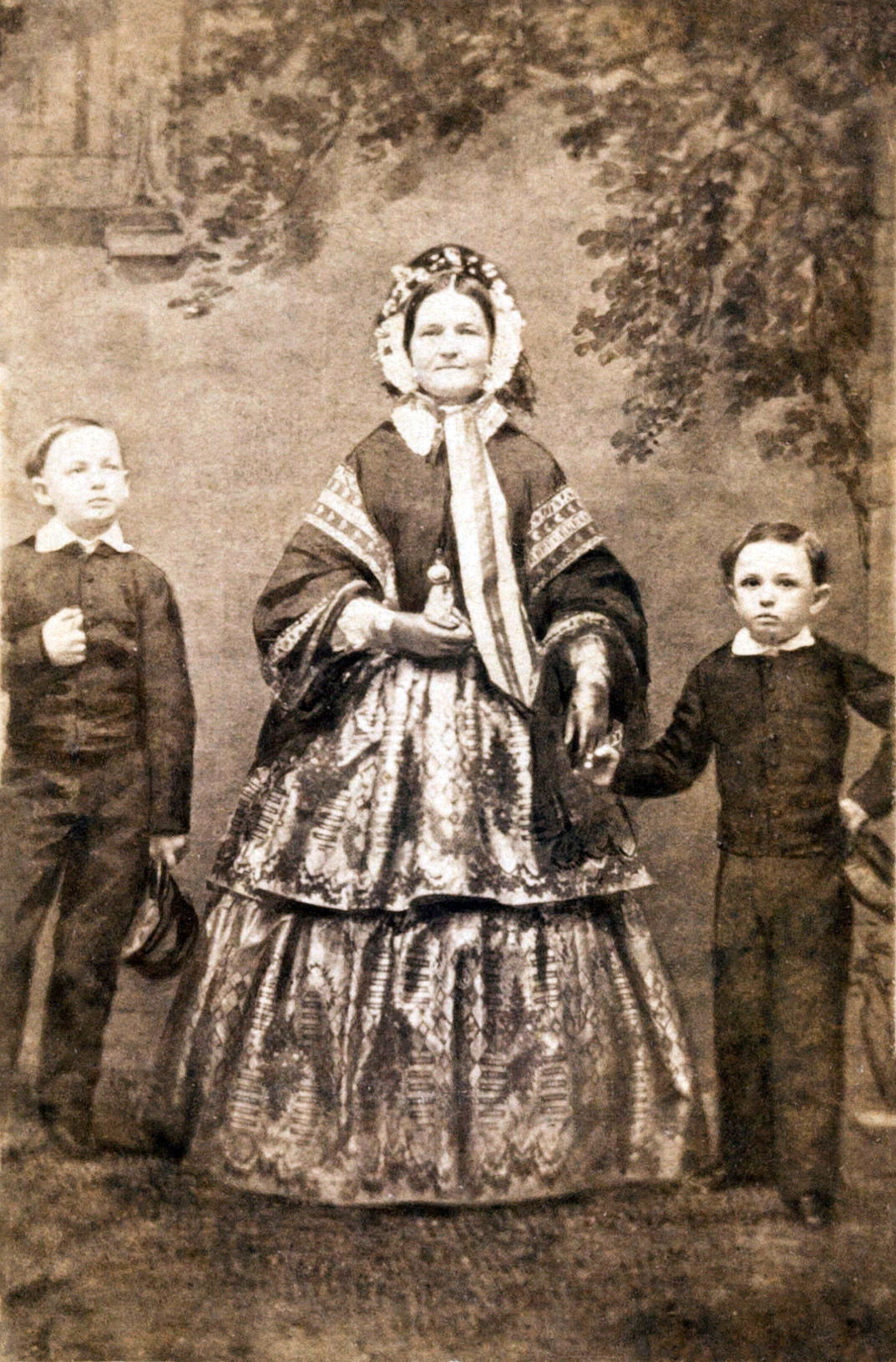
Mary Todd Lincoln with Willie and Tad

Some historians, such as Michael Burlingame, identify Lincoln's first romantic interest as Ann Rutledge, a young woman also from Kentucky whom he met when he moved to New Salem, Illinois. Lewis Gannett disputes that the evidence supports a romantic relationship between the two. David Herbert Donald states that "How that friendship [between Lincoln and Rutledge] developed into a romance cannot be reconstructed from the record". Rutledge died on August 25, 1835, of typhoid fever. Lincoln took her death very hard, sinking into a serious depression and contemplating suicide.

In the early 1830s, Lincoln met Mary Owens from Kentucky. Late in 1836, Lincoln agreed to marry Owens if she returned to New Salem. Owens arrived that November and he courted her, but they both had second thoughts. On August 16, 1837, he wrote Owens a letter saying he would not blame her if she ended the relationship, and she declined to marry him.

In 1839, Lincoln met Mary Todd in Springfield, Illinois, and the following year they became engaged. She was a daughter of Robert Smith Todd, a wealthy lawyer and businessman in Lexington, Kentucky. Lincoln initially broke off the engagement in early 1841, but the two were reconciled and married on November 4, 1842. In 1844, the couple bought a house in Springfield near his law office. The marriage was turbulent; Mary was verbally abusive and at times physically violent towards her husband.

They had four sons. The eldest, Robert Todd Lincoln, was born in 1843 and was the only child to live to adulthood. Edward Baker "Eddie" Lincoln, born in 1846, died February 1, 1850, probably of tuberculosis. Lincoln's third son, William Wallace "Willie" Lincoln, was born on December 21, 1850, and died of a fever at the White House on February 20, 1862. The youngest, Thomas "Tad" Lincoln, was born on April 4, 1853, and died of edema at age 18 on July 16, 1871. Lincoln loved children, and the Lincolns were not considered to be strict with their own. The deaths of Eddie and Willie had profound effects on both parents. Lincoln suffered from "melancholy", a condition now thought to be clinical depression.

=== Early vocations and militia service ===
In 1831, Lincoln's father moved the family to a new homestead in Coles County, Illinois, after which Abraham struck out on his own. He made his home in New Salem, Illinois, for six years. During 1831 and 1832, Lincoln worked at a general store in New Salem. He gained a reputation for strength and courage after winning a wrestling match with the leader of a group of ruffians known as the Clary's Grove boys. In 1832, he declared his candidacy for the Illinois House of Representatives, though he interrupted his campaign to serve as a captain in the Illinois Militia during the Black Hawk War. He was elected the captain of his militia company but did not see combat. In his political campaigning, Lincoln advocated for navigational improvements on the Sangamon River. He drew crowds as a raconteur, but he lacked name recognition, powerful friends, and money, and he lost the election.

When Lincoln returned home from the war, he planned to become a blacksmith but instead purchased a New Salem general store in partnership with William Berry. Because a license was required to sell customers alcoholic beverages, Berry obtained bartending licenses for Lincoln and himself, and in 1833 the Lincoln–Berry General Store became a tavern as well. Burlingame wrote that Berry was "an undisciplined, hard-drinking fellow", and Lincoln "was too soft-hearted to deny anyone credit". Although the economy was booming, the business struggled and went into debt, prompting Lincoln to sell his share.

Lincoln served as New Salem's postmaster and later as county surveyor, but he continued his voracious reading and decided to become a lawyer. Rather than studying in the office of an established attorney, as was customary, Lincoln read law on his own, borrowing legal texts, including Blackstone's Commentaries and Chitty's Pleadings, from attorney John Todd Stuart. He later said of his legal education that he "studied with nobody."

== Early political offices and prairie lawyer ==
=== Illinois state legislature (1834–1842) ===
In Lincoln's second state house campaign in 1834, as a supporter of Whig Party leader Henry Clay, he finished second among thirteen candidates running for four places. Lincoln echoed Clay's support for the American Colonization Society, which advocated abolition in conjunction with settling freed slaves in Liberia. The Whigs also favored economic modernization in banking, tariffs to fund internal improvements such as railroads, and urbanization.

Lincoln served four terms in the Illinois House of Representatives for Sangamon County. In this role, he championed construction of the Illinois and Michigan Canal. Lincoln voted to expand suffrage beyond White landowners to all White men. He supported the chartering of the Illinois State Bank, and also led a successful campaign for moving the state capital from Vandalia to Springfield.

On January 27, 1838, Lincoln delivered an address at the Lyceum in Springfield, after the murder of the anti-slavery newspaper editor Elijah Parish Lovejoy. In this ostensibly non-partisan speech, Lincoln attacked Stephen A. Douglas and the Democratic Party, who the Whigs argued were supporting "mobocracy". His speech also attacked anti-abolitionism and racial bigotry.

Lincoln was criticized in the press for a planned duel with James Shields, whom he had ridiculed in letters published under the name "Aunt Rebecca". Although the duel did not take place, Burlingame noted that "the affair embarrassed Lincoln terribly".

=== U.S. House of Representatives (1847–1849) ===
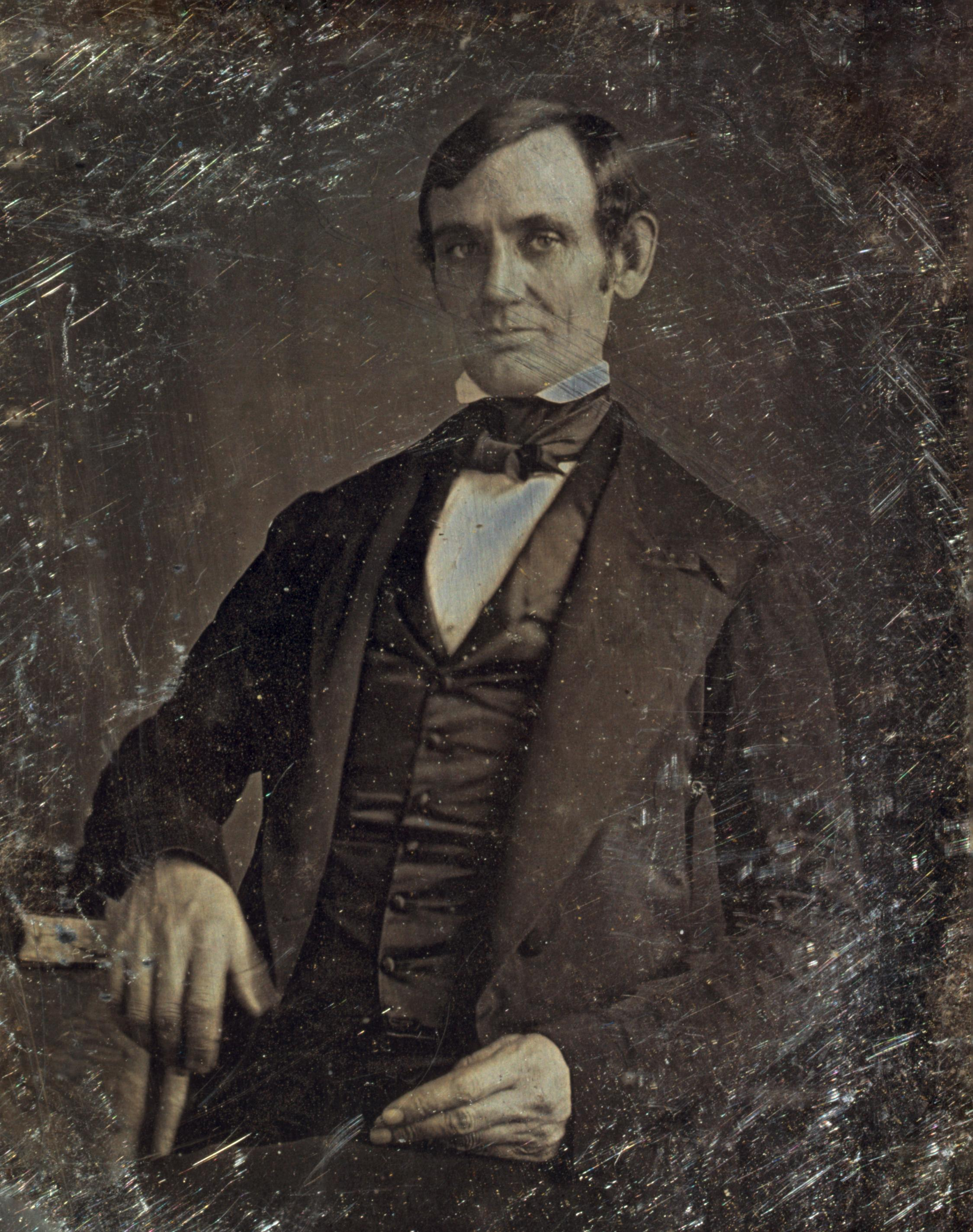
A daguerreotype of Lincoln, taken around 1847, the earliest known photograph of him

In 1843, Lincoln sought the Whig nomination for Illinois's 7th district seat in the U.S. House of Representatives; John J. Hardin was the winning candidate, though Lincoln convinced the party convention to limit Hardin to one term. Lincoln not only gained the nomination in 1846, but also won the election. The only Whig in the Illinois delegation, he was assigned to the Committee on Post Office and Post Roads and the Committee on Expenditures in the War Department. Lincoln teamed with Joshua R. Giddings on a bill to abolish slavery in the District of Columbia, but dropped the bill when it failed to attract support from most other Whigs.

Lincoln spoke against the Mexican–American War (1846–1848), for which he said President James K. Polk had "some strong motive ... to involve the two countries in a war, and trusting to escape scrutiny, by fixing the public gaze upon the exceeding brightness of military glory—that attractive rainbow, that rises in showers of blood". He supported the Wilmot Proviso, a failed 1846 proposal to ban slavery in any U.S. territory won from Mexico. Polk insisted that Mexican soldiers had begun the war by "invading the territory of the State of Texas ... and shedding the blood of our citizens on our own soil". In his 1847 "spot resolutions", Lincoln rhetorically demanded that Polk tell Congress the exact "spot" where this occurred, but the Polk administration did not respond. His approach and rhetoric cost Lincoln political support in his district, and newspapers derisively nicknamed him "spotty Lincoln".

Lincoln had pledged in 1846 to serve only one term in the House. At the 1848 Whig National Convention, he initially supported Henry Clay and was among the leaders of the Illinois delegation backing Clay, voting for him on the early ballots. When it became clear that Clay could not secure the nomination, Lincoln joined other Whigs in shifting support to Zachary Taylor, who won the party's nomination and the presidency in 1848. After Taylor won, Lincoln hoped in vain to be appointed commissioner of the United States General Land Office. The administration offered to appoint him secretary of the Oregon Territory instead. This would have disrupted his legal and political career in Illinois, so he declined and resumed his law practice.

=== Prairie lawyer ===
Lincoln was admitted to the Illinois bar on September 9, 1836. He moved to Springfield and began to practice law under John T. Stuart, Mary Todd's cousin. He partnered for several years with Stephen T. Logan and, in 1844, began his practice with William Herndon.

In his Springfield practice, according to Donald, Lincoln handled "virtually every kind of business that could come before a prairie lawyer". He dealt with many transportation cases in the midst of the nation's western expansion, particularly river barge conflicts under the new railroad bridges. In 1849 he received a patent for a flotation device for the movement of riverboats in shallow water. His patent was never commercialized, but it made Lincoln the only president to hold a patent. Lincoln initially favored riverboat legal interests, but he represented whoever hired him.

He represented a bridge company against a riverboat company in Hurd v. Rock Island Bridge Company, a landmark case involving a canal boat that sank after hitting a bridge. Lincoln appeared before the Illinois Supreme Court in 411 cases. From 1853 to 1860, one of his largest clients was the Illinois Central Railroad, which Lincoln successfully sued to recover his legal fees.

Lincoln represented William "Duff" Armstrong in his 1858 trial for the murder of James Preston Metzker. The case is famous for Lincoln's use of a fact established by judicial notice to challenge the credibility of an eyewitness. After a witness testified to seeing the crime in the moonlight, Lincoln produced a Farmers' Almanac showing the Moon was at a low angle, drastically reducing visibility. Armstrong was acquitted. In an 1859 murder case, he defended "Peachy" Quinn Harrison, the grandson of Peter Cartwright, Lincoln's political opponent. Harrison was charged with the murder of Greek Crafton who, according to Cartwright, said as he lay dying that he had "brought it upon myself" and that he forgave Harrison. Lincoln angrily protested the judge's initial decision to exclude Cartwright's claim as hearsay. Lincoln argued that the testimony involved a dying declaration and so was not subject to the hearsay rule. Instead of holding Lincoln in contempt of court as expected, the judge, a Democrat, admitted the testimony into evidence, resulting in Harrison's acquittal.

== Republican politics (1854–1860) ==
=== Emergence as Republican leader ===
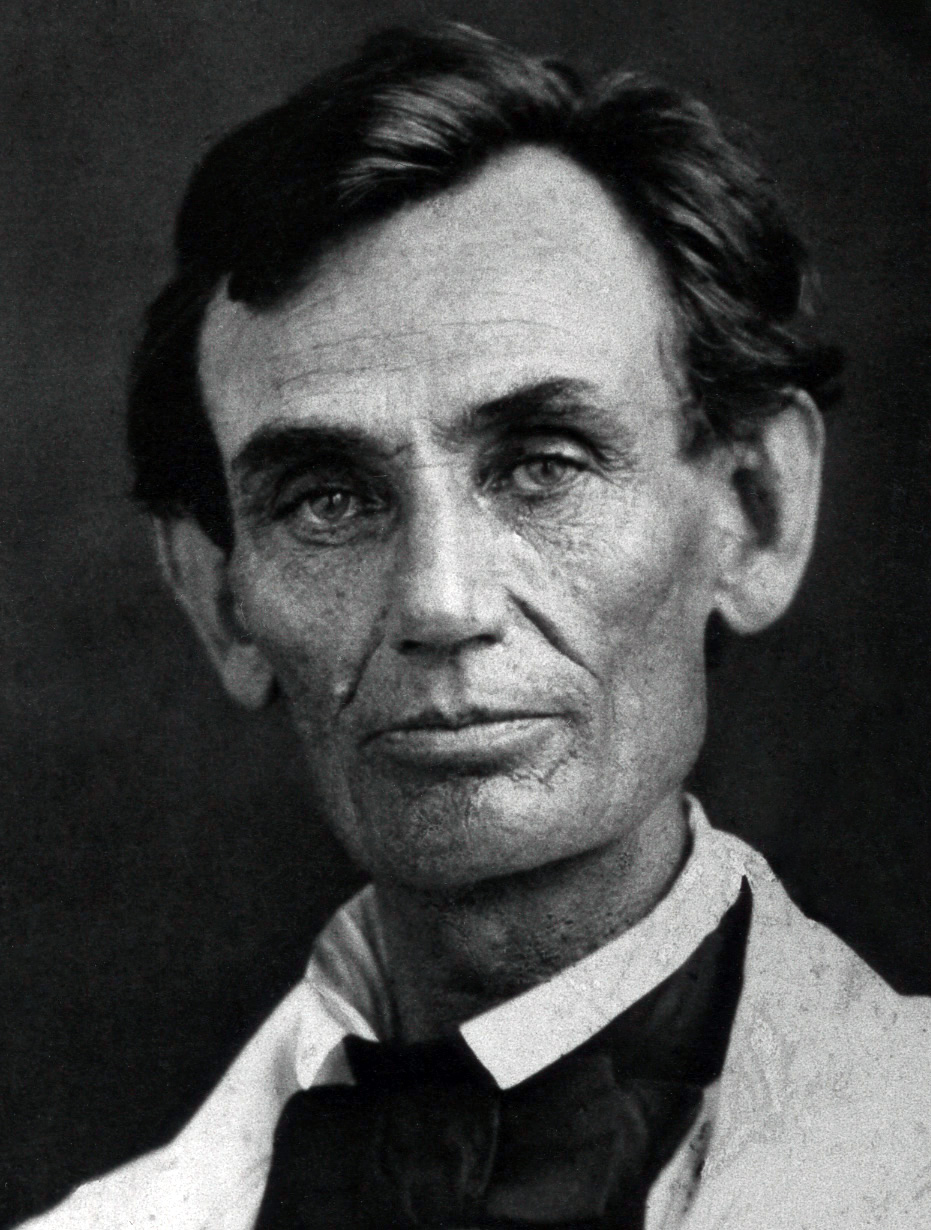
Lincoln in 1858, the year of his debates with Stephen Douglas over slavery

The Compromise of 1850 failed to alleviate tensions over slavery between the slave-holding South and the free North. As the slavery debate in the Nebraska and Kansas territories became particularly acrimonious, Illinois Senator Stephen A. Douglas proposed popular sovereignty as a compromise; the measure would allow the electorate of each territory to decide the status of slavery. The legislation alarmed many Northerners, who sought to prevent the spread of slavery, but Douglas's Kansas–Nebraska Act narrowly passed Congress in May 1854. Lincoln's Peoria Speech of October 1854, in which he declared his opposition to slavery, was one of an estimated 175 speeches he delivered in the next six years on the topic of excluding slavery from the territories. Lincoln's attacks on the Kansas–Nebraska Act marked his return to political life.

Nationally, the Whigs were irreparably split by the Kansas–Nebraska Act and other ineffective efforts to compromise on the slavery issue. Reflecting on the demise of his party, Lincoln wrote in 1855, "I think I am a whig; but others say there are no whigs, and that I am an abolitionist.... I now do no more than oppose the extension of slavery." The new Republican Party was formed as a northern party dedicated to anti-slavery, drawing from the anti-slavery wing of the Whig Party and combining Free Soil, Liberty, and anti-slavery Democratic Party members.

Lincoln resisted early Republican entreaties, fearing that the new party would become a platform for extreme abolitionists. Lincoln held out hope for rejuvenating the Whigs, though he lamented his party's growing closeness with the nativist Know Nothing movement. In 1854, Lincoln was elected to the Illinois legislature, but before the term began he declined to take his seat so that he would be eligible to run in the upcoming U.S. Senate election.

At that time, senators were elected by state legislatures. After leading in the first six rounds of voting, Lincoln was unable to obtain a majority. Lincoln instructed his backers to vote for Lyman Trumbull, an anti-slavery Democrat who had received few votes in the earlier ballots. Lincoln's decision to withdraw enabled his Whig supporters and Trumbull's anti-slavery Democrats to combine and defeat the mainstream Democratic candidate, Joel Aldrich Matteson.

==== 1856 campaign ====
Violent political confrontations in Kansas continued, and opposition to the Kansas–Nebraska Act remained strong throughout the North. As the 1856 elections approached, Lincoln joined the Republicans and attended the Bloomington Convention, where the Illinois Republican Party was established. The convention platform endorsed Congress's right to regulate slavery in the territories and backed the admission of Kansas as a free state. Lincoln gave the final speech of the convention, calling for the preservation of the Union.

At the June 1856 Republican National Convention, Lincoln received support to run as vice president, but the party put forward a ticket of John C. Frémont and William Dayton, which Lincoln supported throughout Illinois. The Democrats nominated James Buchanan and the Know Nothings nominated Millard Fillmore. Buchanan prevailed, while Republican William Henry Bissell was elected governor of Illinois, and Lincoln became a leading Republican in Illinois. (Note: Eric Foner contrasts the abolitionists and anti-slavery Radical Republicans of the Northeast, who saw slavery as a sin, with the conservative Republicans, who thought it was bad because it hurt White people and blocked progress. Foner argues that Lincoln was in the middle, opposing slavery primarily because it violated the republicanism principles of the Founding Fathers, especially the equality of all men and democratic self-government as expressed in the Declaration of Independence.)

==== Dred Scott v. Sandford ====
Dred Scott was a slave whose master took him from a slave state to a territory that was free as a result of the Missouri Compromise. After Scott was returned to the slave state, he petitioned a federal court for his freedom. His petition was denied in Dred Scott v. Sandford (1857). Supreme Court Chief Justice Roger B. Taney wrote in his opinion that the Missouri Compromise was unconstitutional because it infringed on slave owners' property rights by prohibiting them from bringing their slaves into the territories. While many Democrats hoped that Dred Scott would end the dispute over slavery in the territories, the decision sparked further outrage in the North. Lincoln denounced it as the product of a conspiracy of Democrats to support the Slave Power. He argued that the decision was at variance with the Declaration of Independence, which, as Lincoln paraphrased it, stated that "all men [are] created equal—equal in certain inalienable rights, among which are life, liberty, and the pursuit of happiness".

=== Lincoln–Douglas debates and Cooper Union speech ===
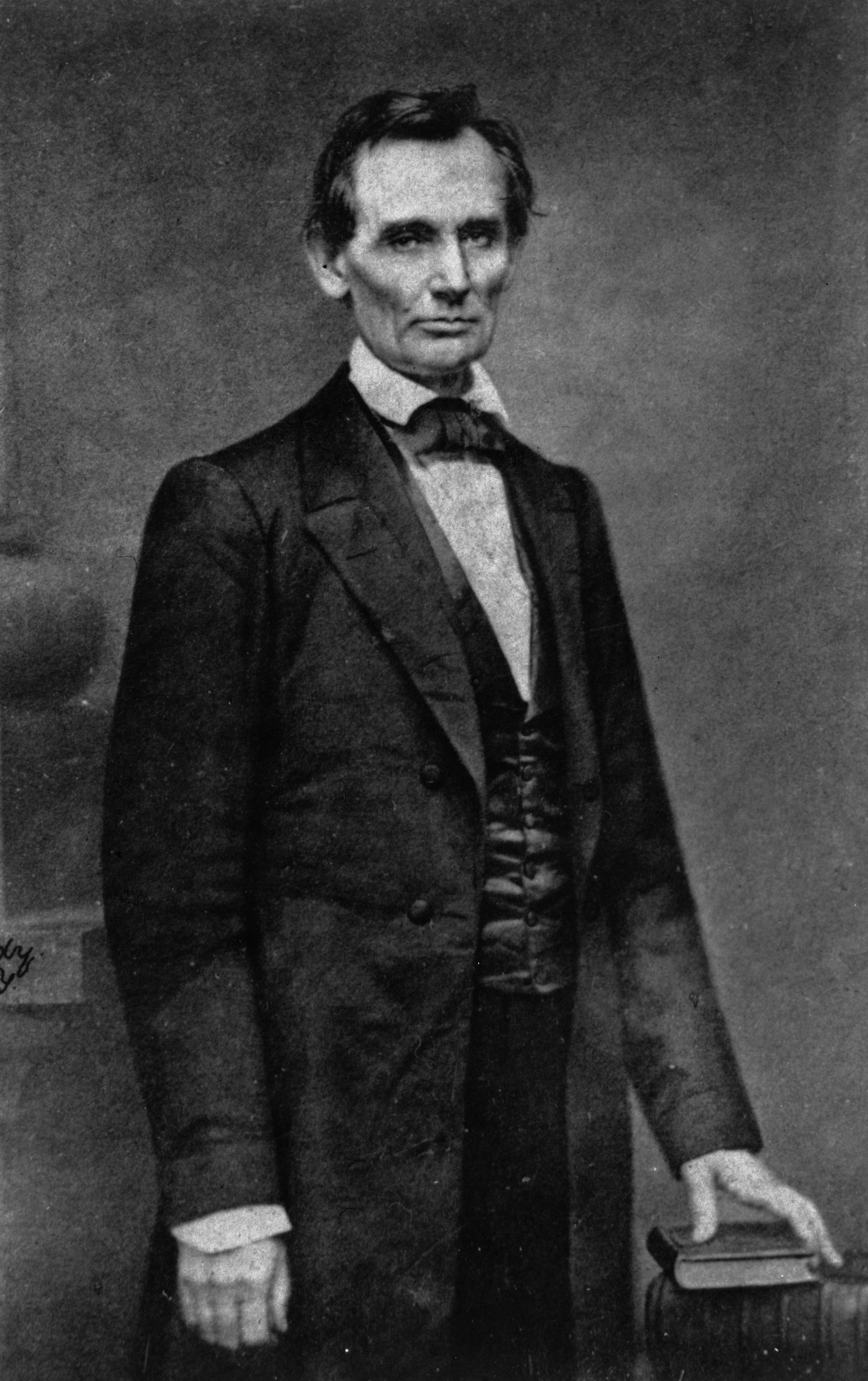
Abraham Lincoln, a portrait by Mathew Brady taken February 27, 1860, the day of Lincoln's Cooper Union speech in New York City.

In 1858, Douglas was up for re-election in the U.S. Senate, and Lincoln hoped to defeat him. Many in the party felt that a former Whig should be nominated in 1858, and Lincoln's 1856 campaigning and support of Trumbull had earned him a favor. For the first time, Illinois Republicans held a convention to agree upon a Senate candidate, and Lincoln won the nomination with little opposition. Lincoln accepted the nomination with great enthusiasm and zeal. After his nomination he delivered his House Divided Speech:

"A house divided against itself cannot stand." I believe this government cannot endure, permanently half slave and half free. I do not expect the Union to be dissolved—I do not expect the house to fall—but I do expect it will cease to be divided. It will become all one thing, or all the other.

The speech created a stark image of the danger of disunion. When informed of Lincoln's nomination, Douglas stated, "[Lincoln] is the strong man of the party ... and if I beat him, my victory will be hardly won."

The Senate campaign featured seven debates between Lincoln and Douglas; they had an atmosphere akin to a prizefight and drew thousands. Lincoln warned that the Slave Power was threatening the values of republicanism, and he accused Douglas of distorting Jefferson's premise that all men are created equal. In his Freeport Doctrine, Douglas argued that, despite the Dred Scott decision, which he claimed to support, local settlers, under popular sovereignty, should be free to choose whether to allow slavery in their territory. He accused Lincoln of having joined the abolitionists.

Though the Republican legislative candidates won more popular votes, the Democrats won more seats, and the legislature re-elected Douglas. However, Lincoln's articulation of the issues had given him a national political presence. In the aftermath of the 1858 election, newspapers frequently mentioned Lincoln as a potential Republican presidential candidate. While Lincoln was popular in the Midwest, he lacked support in the Northeast and was unsure whether to seek the office. In January 1860, Lincoln told a group of political allies that he would accept the presidential nomination if offered and, in the following months, William O. Stoddard's Central Illinois Gazette, the Chicago Press & Tribune, and other local papers endorsed his candidacy.

In February 1860, Henry Ward Beecher invited Lincoln to address his congregation at Plymouth Church in Brooklyn, New York. Lincoln agreed, but the venue shifted to Cooper Union in Manhattan. In his speech at Cooper Union, which he gave on February 27, Lincoln argued that the Founding Fathers had little use for popular sovereignty, and that in the Northwest Ordinance they had restricted slavery in the territories; he insisted that morality required opposition to slavery and rejected any "groping for some middle ground between the right and the wrong". Many in the audience thought he appeared awkward and even ugly. But Lincoln demonstrated intellectual leadership, which brought him into contention for the presidency. Journalist Noah Brooks reported, "No man ever before made such an impression on his first appeal to a New York audience". Historian David Herbert Donald described the speech as "a superb political move for an unannounced presidential aspirant." In response to an inquiry about his ambitions, Lincoln said, "The taste is in my mouth a little".

=== 1860 presidential election ===
On May 9–10, 1860, the Illinois Republican State Convention was held in Decatur. Exploiting his embellished frontier legend of clearing land and splitting fence rails, Lincoln's supporters promoted him as "The Rail Candidate". On May 18 at the Republican National Convention in Chicago, Lincoln won the nomination on the third ballot. A former Democrat, Hannibal Hamlin of Maine, was nominated for vice president to balance the ticket.

Throughout the 1850s, Lincoln had not anticipated civil war, and his supporters rejected claims that his election would incite secession. When Douglas was selected as the candidate of the Northern Democrats, delegates from the Southern slave states selected incumbent Vice President John C. Breckinridge as their candidate. A group of former Whigs and Know Nothings formed the Constitutional Union Party and nominated John Bell of Tennessee. Lincoln and Douglas competed for votes in the North, while Bell and Breckinridge found support primarily in the South. A nationwide militaristic Republican youth organization, the Wide Awakes, "turned it into one of the most excited elections in American history" and "triggered massive popular enthusiasm", according to the political historian Jon Grinspan. People of the Northern states knew the Southern states would vote against Lincoln and rallied supporters for him.

Map of the results of the election, 1860

As Douglas and the other candidates campaigned, Lincoln gave no speeches, relying on the enthusiasm of the Republican Party. Republican speakers emphasized Lincoln's childhood poverty to demonstrate the power of "free labor", which allowed a common farm boy to work his way to the top by his own efforts. Though he did not make public appearances, many sought to visit and write to Lincoln. In the runup to the election, he took an office in the Illinois state capitol to deal with the influx of attention. He also hired John George Nicolay as his personal secretary, who would remain in that role during the presidency.

On November 6, 1860, Lincoln was elected as the first Republican president. His victory was entirely due to his support in the North and West. No ballots were cast for him in 10 of the 15 Southern slave states. Lincoln received 1,866,452 votes, or 39.8 percent of the total in a four-way race, carrying the free Northern states, as well as California and Oregon, and winning the electoral vote decisively.

== Presidency (1861–1865) ==
=== First term ===
==== Secession and inauguration ====
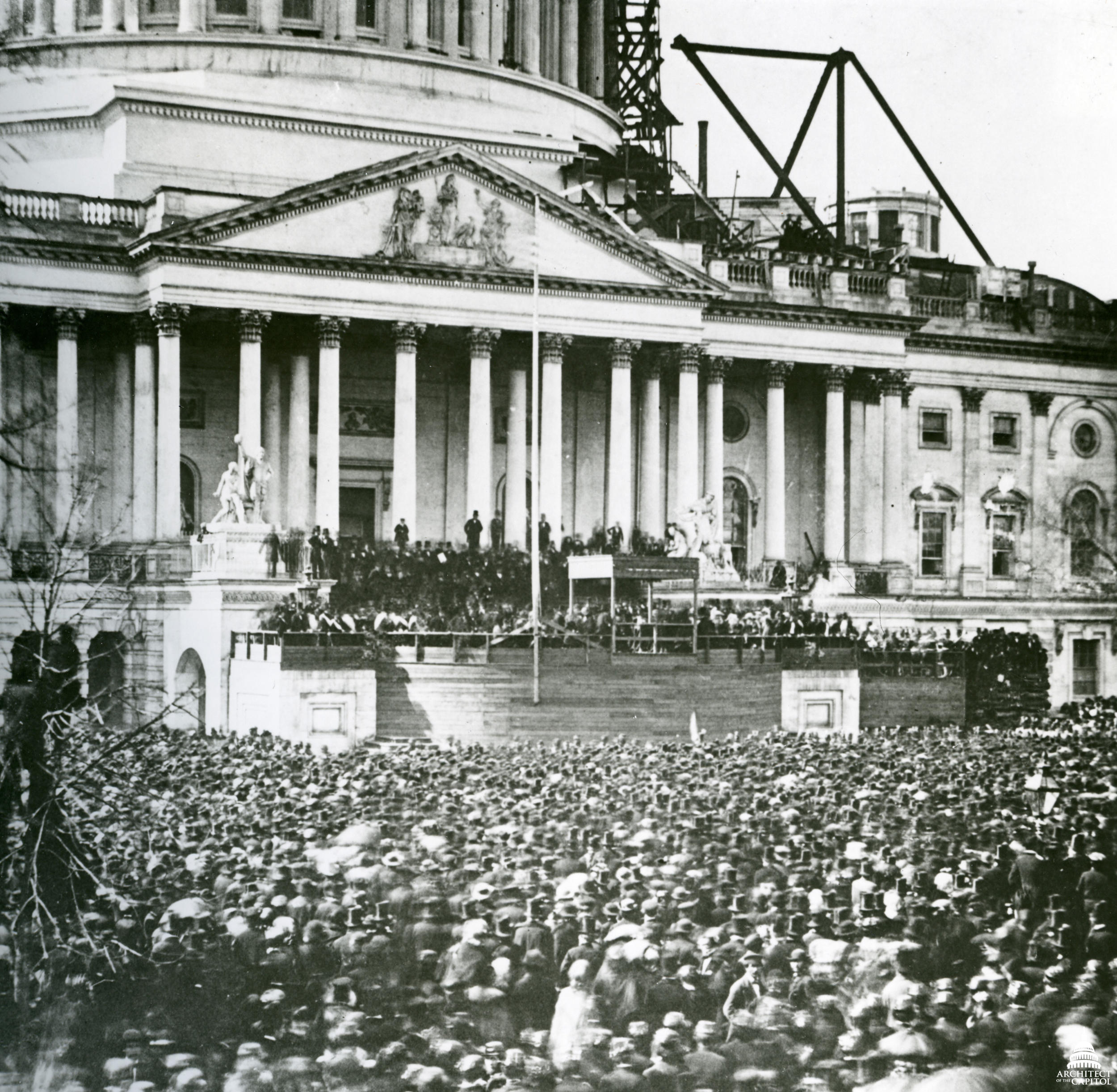
Lincoln's first inaugural at the United States Capitol on March 4, 1861, with the Capitol dome above the rotunda still under construction

After Lincoln's election, secessionists implemented plans to leave the Union before he took office in March 1861. On December 20, 1860, South Carolina adopted an ordinance of secession; by February 1, 1861, Florida, Mississippi, Alabama, Georgia, Louisiana, and Texas had followed. Six of these states declared themselves to be a sovereign nation, the Confederate States of America, selecting Jefferson Davis as its provisional president.

The upper South and border states (Delaware, Maryland, Virginia, North Carolina, Tennessee, Kentucky, Missouri, and Arkansas) initially rejected the secessionist appeal. President Buchanan and President-elect Lincoln refused to recognize the Confederacy, declaring secession illegal. On February 11, 1861, Lincoln gave a particularly emotional farewell address upon leaving Springfield for Washington.

Lincoln and the Republicans rejected the proposed Crittenden Compromise as contrary to the party's platform of free-soil in the territories. Lincoln said, "I will suffer death before I consent ... to any concession or compromise which looks like buying the privilege to take possession of this government to which we have a constitutional right". Lincoln supported the Corwin Amendment to the U.S. Constitution, which would have protected slavery in states where it already existed. The amendment passed Congress and was awaiting ratification by the required three-fourths of the states when Southern states began to secede. On March 4, 1861, in his first inaugural address, Lincoln said that, because he held "such a provision to now be implied constitutional law, I have no objection to its being made express, and irrevocable".

Due to secessionist plots, careful attention was paid to Lincoln's security and the train he took to Washington. The president-elect evaded suspected assassins in Baltimore. He traveled in disguise, wearing a soft felt hat instead of his customary stovepipe hat and draping an overcoat over his shoulders while hunching to conceal his height. On February 23, 1861, he arrived in Washington, D.C., which was placed under military guard. Many in the opposition press criticized his secretive journey; opposition newspapers mocked Lincoln with caricatures showing him sneaking into the capital. Lincoln directed his inaugural address to the South, proclaiming once again that he had no inclination to abolish slavery in the Southern states:

Apprehension seems to exist among the people of the Southern States, that by the accession of a Republican Administration, their property, and their peace, and personal security, are to be endangered. There has never been any reasonable cause for such apprehension. Indeed, the most ample evidence to the contrary has all the while existed, and been open to their inspection. It is found in nearly all the published speeches of him who now addresses you. I do but quote from one of those speeches when I declare that "I have no purpose, directly or indirectly, to interfere with the institution of slavery in the States where it exists. I believe I have no lawful right to do so, and I have no inclination to do so."

— First inaugural address, 4 March 1861

The president ended his address with an appeal to the people of the South: "We are not enemies, but friends.... The mystic chords of memory, stretching from every battle-field, and patriot grave, to every living heart and hearthstone ... will yet swell the chorus of the Union, when again touched ... by the better angels of our nature". According to Donald, the failure of the Peace Conference of 1861 to attract the attendance of seven of the Confederate states signaled that legislative compromise was not a practical expectation.

==== Personnel ====
Lincoln cabinet
Office	Name	Term
President	Abraham Lincoln	1861–1865
Vice President	Hannibal Hamlin	1861–1865
Andrew Johnson	1865
Secretary of State	William H. Seward	1861–1865
Secretary of the Treasury	Salmon P. Chase	1861–1864
William P. Fessenden	1864–1865
Hugh McCulloch	1865
Secretary of War	Simon Cameron	1861–1862
Edwin M. Stanton	1862–1865
Attorney General	Edward Bates	1861–1864
James Speed	1864–1865
Postmaster General	Montgomery Blair	1861–1864
William Dennison Jr.	1864–1865
Secretary of the Navy	Gideon Welles	1861–1865
Secretary of the Interior	Caleb Blood Smith	1861–1862
John Palmer Usher	1863–1865

In selecting his cabinet, Lincoln chose the men he found the most competent, even when they had been his opponents for the presidency. Lincoln commented on his thought process, "We need the strongest men of the party in the Cabinet. We needed to hold our own people together. I had looked the party over and concluded that these were the very strongest men. Then I had no right to deprive the country of their services." Doris Kearns Goodwin described the group in her 2005 biography of Lincoln as a "Team of Rivals". Lincoln named his main political opponent, William H. Seward, as Secretary of State.

Lincoln made five appointments to the Supreme Court. Noah Haynes Swayne, a prominent corporate lawyer from Ohio, replaced John McLean after the latter's death in April 1861. Like McLean, Swayne opposed slavery. Samuel Freeman Miller, who replaced Peter V. Daniel, was an avowed abolitionist and received widespread support from Iowa politicians. David Davis was Lincoln's campaign manager in 1860 and had served as a judge in the Illinois court circuit where Lincoln practiced.

Democrat Stephen Johnson Field, a previous California Supreme Court justice, provided geographic and political balance. After the death of Roger B. Taney, Lincoln appointed his former secretary of the treasury, Salmon P. Chase, to replace Taney as chief justice. Lincoln believed Chase was an able jurist who would support Reconstruction legislation and that his appointment would unite the Republican Party.

==== Commander-in-Chief ====
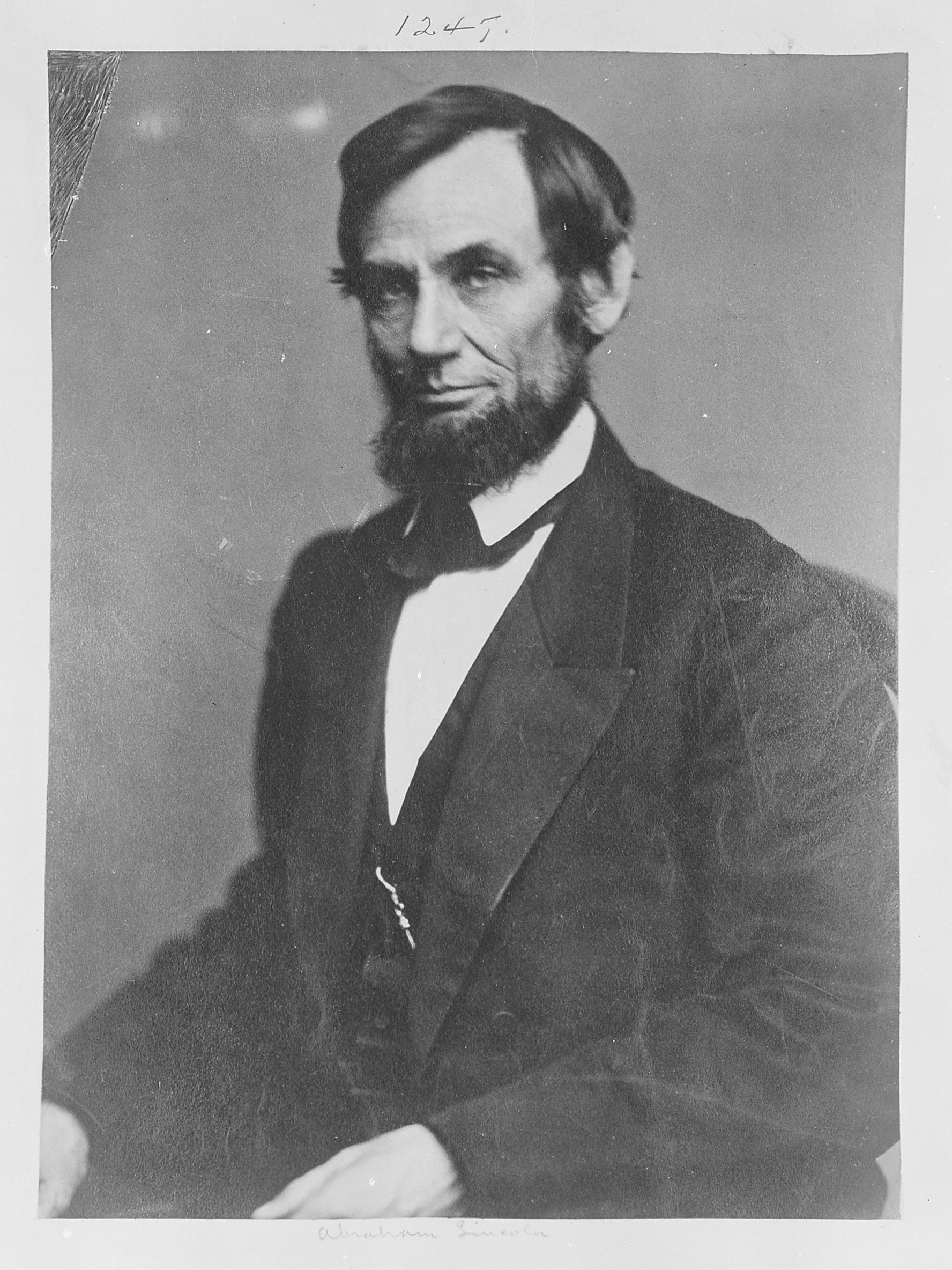
Portrait of Lincoln c. 1862

In early April 1861, Major Robert Anderson, commander of Fort Sumter in Charleston, South Carolina, advised that he was nearly out of food. After considerable deliberation, Lincoln decided to send provisions; according to Michael Burlingame, he "could not be sure that his decision would precipitate a war, though he had good reason to believe that it might". On April 12, 1861, Confederate forces fired on Union troops at Fort Sumter, starting the American Civil War. Donald concludes:

His repeated efforts to avoid collision ... showed that he adhered to his vow not to be the first to shed fraternal blood. But he had also vowed not to surrender the forts.... The only resolution of these contradictory positions was for the Confederates to fire the first shot.

The April 12 and 13 attack on Fort Sumter rallied the Northern public to see military action against the South as necessary to defend the nation. On April 15, Lincoln called for 75,000 militiamen to recapture forts, protect Washington, and preserve the Union. This call forced states to choose whether to secede or to support the Union. North Carolina, Virginia, Tennessee, and Arkansas seceded. As the Northern states sent regiments south, on April 19 Baltimore mobs in control of the rail links attacked Union troops who were changing trains. Local leaders' groups later burned critical rail bridges to the capital and the Army responded by arresting local Maryland officials. Lincoln suspended the writ of habeas corpus, allowing arrests without formal charges.

John Merryman, a Maryland officer arrested for hindering U.S. troop movements, successfully petitioned Supreme Court Chief Justice Taney to issue a writ of habeas corpus. In an opinion titled Ex parte Merryman, Taney, not ruling on behalf of the Supreme Court, wrote that the Constitution authorized only Congress and not the president to suspend habeas corpus. But Lincoln engaged in nonacquiescence and persisted with the policy of suspension in select areas. Under various suspensions, 15,000 civilians were detained without trial; several, including the anti-war Democrat Clement L. Vallandigham, were tried in military courts for "treasonable" actions, which was condemned as an attack on free speech.

==== Early Union military strategy ====
Lincoln took executive control of the war and shaped the Union military strategy. He responded to the unprecedented political and military crisis as commander-in-chief by exercising unprecedented authority. He expanded his war powers, imposed a naval blockade on Confederate ports, disbursed funds before appropriation by Congress, suspended habeas corpus, and arrested and imprisoned thousands of suspected Confederate sympathizers. Lincoln gained the support of Congress and the northern public for these actions. Lincoln also had to reinforce Union sympathies in the border slave states and keep the war from becoming an international conflict.

It was clear from the outset that bipartisan support was essential to success, and that any compromise alienated factions in both political parties. Copperheads (anti-war Democrats) criticized Lincoln for refusing to compromise on slavery; the Radical Republicans, who demanded harsh treatment against secession, criticized him for moving too slowly to abolish slavery. On August 6, 1861, Lincoln signed the Confiscation Act, which authorized judicial proceedings to confiscate and free slaves who were used to support the Confederates. The law had little practical effect, but it signaled political support for abolishing slavery.

Lincoln's war strategy had two priorities: ensuring that Washington was well defended and conducting an aggressive war effort for a prompt, decisive victory. (Note: Major Northern newspapers predicted victory within 90 days.) Twice a week, Lincoln met with his cabinet. Occasionally, Lincoln's wife, Mary, prevailed on him to take a carriage ride, concerned that he was working too hard. Early in the war, Lincoln selected civilian generals from varied political and ethnic backgrounds "to secure their and their constituents' support for the war effort and ensure that the war became a national struggle". In January 1862, after complaints of inefficiency and profiteering in the War Department, Lincoln replaced Simon Cameron as secretary of war with Edwin Stanton. Stanton worked more often and more closely with Lincoln than did any other senior official. According to Stanton's biographers Benjamin P. Thomas and Harold Hyman, "Stanton and Lincoln virtually conducted the war together".

Lincoln saw the importance of Vicksburg for control of the Mississippi River valley and understood the necessity of defeating the enemy's army, rather than merely capturing territory. In directing the Union's war strategy, Lincoln valued the advice of Winfield Scott, even after his retirement as Commanding General of the United States Army. In 1861 Scott proposed the Anaconda Plan, which relied on port blockades and advancing down the Mississippi to subdue the South. In June 1862, Lincoln made an unannounced visit to West Point, where he spent five hours consulting with Scott regarding the handling of the war.

Internationally, Lincoln wanted to forestall foreign military aid to the Confederacy. He relied on his combative Secretary of State William Seward while working closely with Senate Foreign Relations Committee chairman Charles Sumner. In 1861 the U.S. Navy illegally intercepted a British mail ship, the RMS Trent, on the high seas and seized two Confederate envoys. Although the North celebrated the seizure, Britain protested vehemently, and the Trent Affair threatened war between the Americans and the British. Lincoln ended the crisis by releasing the two diplomats.

==== McClellan ====
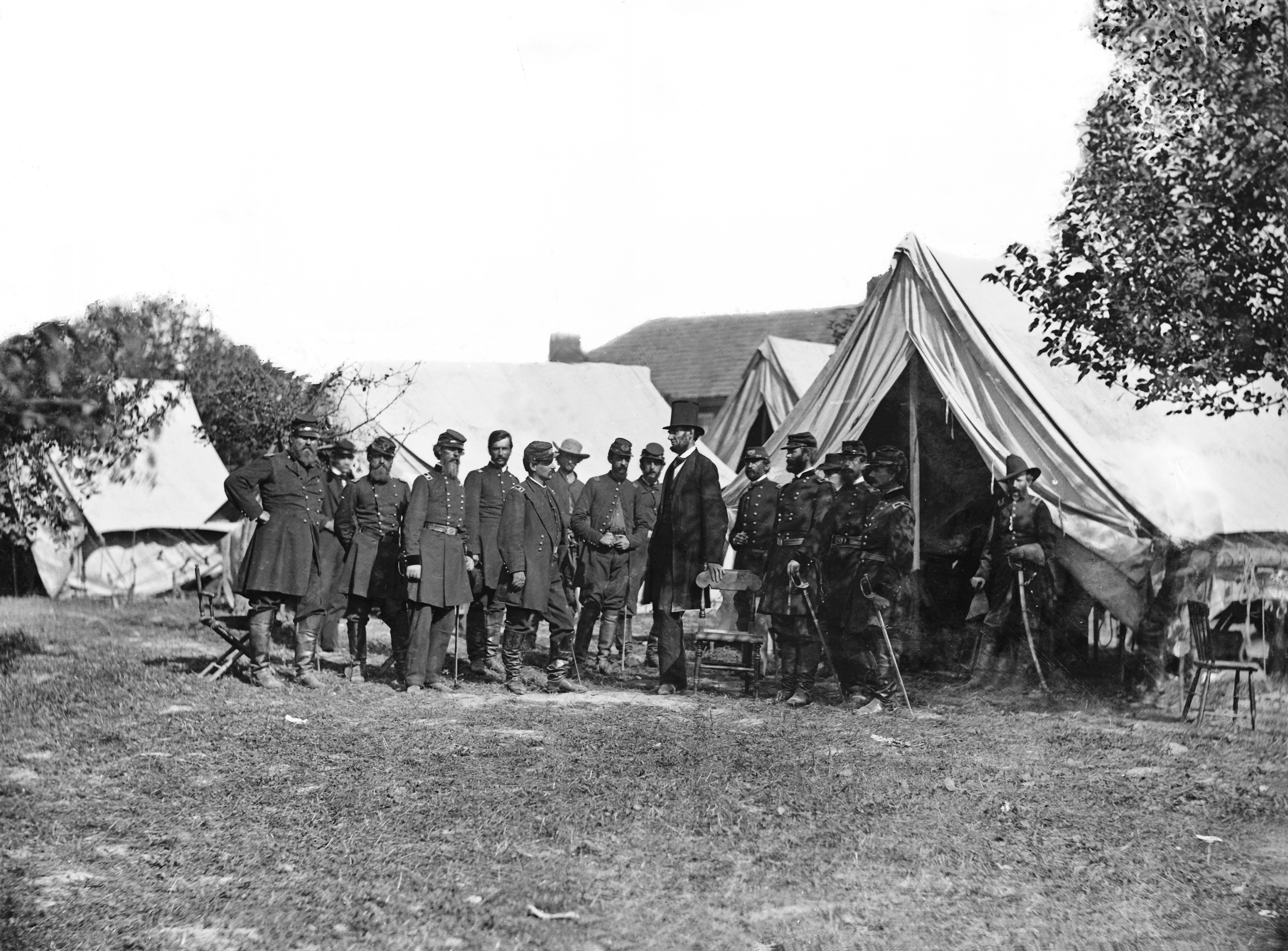
Lincoln meeting with Union Army officers on October 3, 1862, following the Battle of Antietam, including left to right: Col. Delos Sackett; 4. Gen. George W. Morell; 5. Alexander S. Webb, Chief of Staff, V Corps; 6. McClellan;. 8. Jonathan Letterman; 10. Lincoln; 11. Henry J. Hunt; 12. Fitz John Porter; 15. Andrew A. Humphreys; 16. Capt. George Armstrong Custer

After the Union rout at Bull Run and Winfield Scott's retirement, Lincoln appointed George B. McClellan general-in-chief. Early in the war, McClellan created defenses for Washington that were almost impregnable: 48 forts and batteries, with 480 guns manned by 7,200 artillerists. He spent months planning his Virginia Peninsula Campaign. McClellan's slow progress and excessive precautions frustrated Lincoln. McClellan, in turn, blamed the failure of the campaign on Lincoln's cautiousness in having reserved troops for the capital. In 1862, Lincoln removed McClellan as general-in-chief; he elevated Henry Halleck to the post and appointed John Pope as head of the new Army of Virginia. In the summer of 1862 Pope was soundly defeated at the Second Battle of Bull Run, forcing him to retreat to Washington. Soon after, the Army of Virginia was disbanded.

Despite his dissatisfaction with McClellan's failure to reinforce Pope, Lincoln restored him to command of all forces around Washington, which included both the Army of the Potomac and the remains of the Army of Virginia. Two days later, Robert E. Lee's forces crossed the Potomac River into Maryland, leading to the Battle of Antietam. This battle, a Union victory, was among the bloodiest in American history. A crisis of command occurred for Lincoln when McClellan then resisted the president's demand that he pursue Lee's withdrawing army, while Don Carlos Buell likewise refused orders to move the Army of the Ohio against rebel forces in eastern Tennessee. Lincoln replaced Buell with William Rosecrans and McClellan with Ambrose Burnside; according to Donald, this was a "shrewd" political move as they were non-partisan—unlike McClellan, a Democrat. Against presidential advice, Burnside launched an offensive across the Rappahannock River and was defeated by Lee at Fredericksburg in December. Facing low morale and discontent among the troops, Lincoln replaced Burnside with Joseph Hooker. Hooker endured heavy casualties at the Battle of Chancellorsville in May, then resigned in June and was replaced by George Meade. Meade followed Lee north into Pennsylvania and defeated him in the Gettysburg campaign but then failed to effectively block Lee's orderly retreat to Virginia, despite Lincoln's demands. At the same time, Ulysses S. Grant captured Vicksburg and gained control of the Mississippi River. In May 1863, Lincoln issued the Lieber Code, which governed wartime conduct of the Union Army, defining command responsibility for war crimes and crimes against humanity.

==== Emancipation Proclamation ====
Two Union generals had issued emancipation orders in 1861 and 1862, but Lincoln overrode both: he found that the decision to emancipate was not within the generals' power, and that it might induce loyal border states to secede. However, in June 1862, Congress passed an act banning slavery in all federal territories, which Lincoln signed. In July, the Confiscation Act of 1862 was enacted, allowing the seizure of slaves from those disloyal to the United States. On July 22, 1862, Lincoln reviewed a draft of the Emancipation Proclamation with his cabinet. Senator Willard Saulsbury Sr. criticized the proclamation, stating that it "would light their author to dishonor through all future generations". By contrast, Horace Greeley, editor of the New-York Tribune, in his public letter, "The Prayer of Twenty Millions", implored Lincoln to embrace emancipation. In a public letter of August 22, 1862, Lincoln replied to Greeley that while he personally wished all men could be free, his first obligation as president was to preserve the Union:

My paramount object in this struggle is to save the Union, and is not either to save or to destroy slavery. If I could save the Union without freeing any slave I would do it, and if I could save it by freeing all the slaves I would do it; and if I could save it by freeing some and leaving others alone I would also do that.

Buttressed by news of the recent Union victory at Antietam, on September 22, 1862, Lincoln issued the preliminary Emancipation Proclamation, which proclaimed that, on January 1, 1863, all persons held as slaves within any state still in rebellion would be free. On January 1, 1863, he issued the final Emancipation Proclamation, freeing the slaves in the ten states not then under Union control, exempting areas under such control. Lincoln commented on signing the Proclamation: "I never, in my life, felt more certain that I was doing right, than I do in signing this paper." On New Year's Eve in 1862, Black people – enslaved and free – gathered across the United States to hold Watch Night ceremonies for "Freedom's Eve", looking toward the promised fulfillment of the Proclamation. With the abolition of slavery in the rebel states now a military objective, Union armies advancing south enabled thousands to escape bondage.

The Proclamation was immediately denounced by Copperheads, who advocated restoring the union by allowing slavery. It was also seen as a betrayal of his promise to Southern Unionists not to tamper with slavery; Emerson Etheridge, then Clerk of the House of Representatives, joined an unsuccessful plot to give the Democrats and Southern Unionists control of the House. As a result of the Proclamation, enlisting freedmen became official policy. In a letter to Tennessee military governor Andrew Johnson, Lincoln wrote, "The bare sight of fifty thousand armed, and drilled black soldiers on the banks of the Mississippi would end the rebellion at once".

==== Gettysburg Address (1863) ====
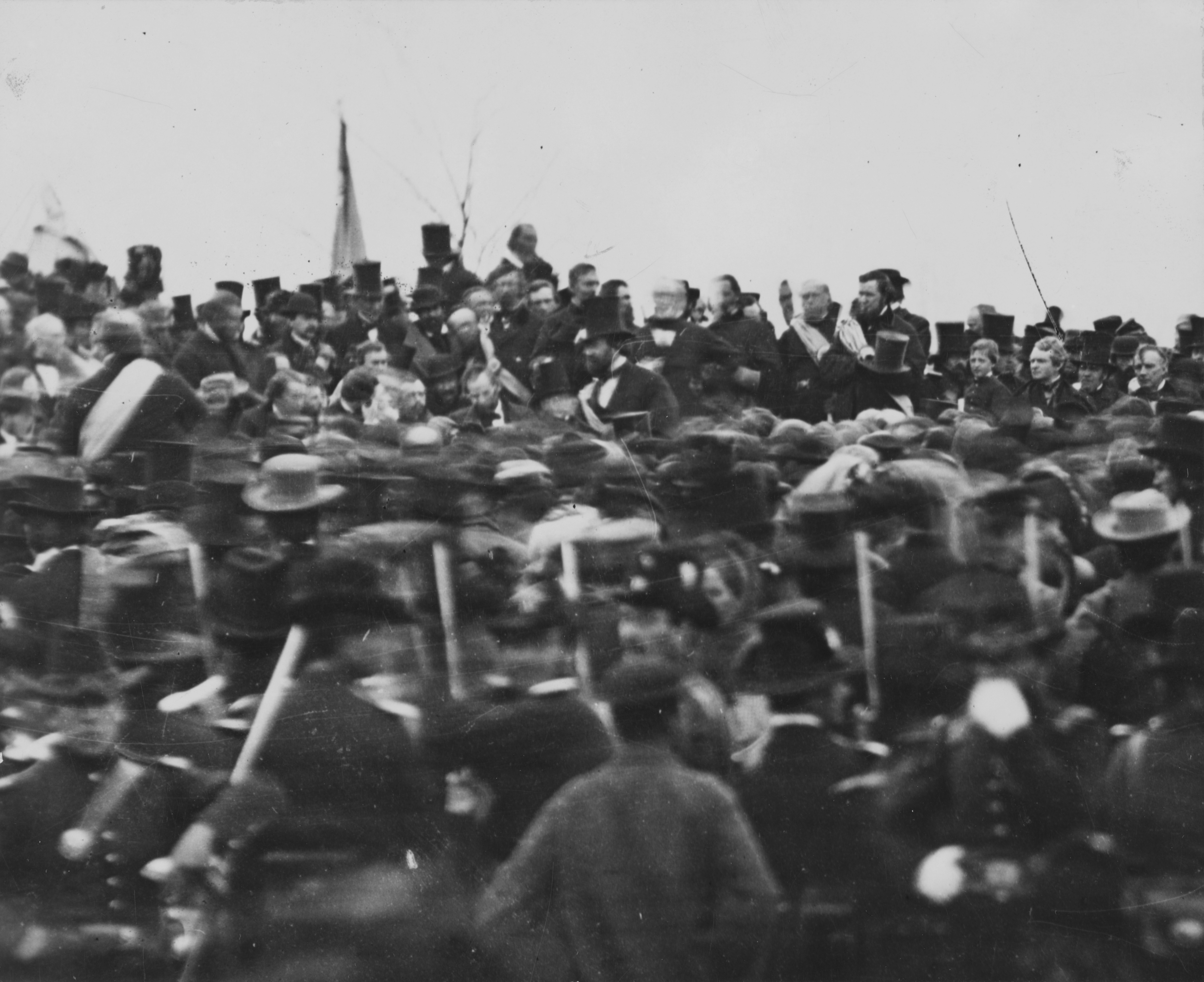
One of only two confirmed photos of Lincoln at Gettysburg (seated in center facing camera), taken about noon on November 19, 1863; some three hours later, Lincoln delivered the famed address. To Lincoln's right is Ward Hill Lamon, Lincoln's bodyguard.

Lincoln gave the dedication for the Gettysburg battlefield cemetery on November 19, 1863. He asserted that the nation was "conceived in liberty and dedicated to the proposition that all men are created equal", and that the deaths of the "brave men ... who struggled here" would not be in vain, but that the nation "shall have a new birth of freedom—and that government of the people, by the people, for the people, shall not perish from the earth". The address became the most quoted speech in American history.

Following Admiral David Farragut's capture of New Orleans in 1862, and after victories at Gettysburg and Vicksburg, Lincoln proclaimed a national Thanksgiving holiday, to be celebrated on the final Thursday of November 1863.

==== Promoting Grant ====
Grant's victories at the Battle of Shiloh and in the Vicksburg campaign impressed Lincoln. Responding to criticism of Grant after Shiloh, Lincoln said, "I can't spare this man. He fights." Following Meade's failure to capture Lee's army after Gettysburg and after Grant's success at Chattanooga, Lincoln promoted Grant to commander of all Union armies.

Lincoln reacted to Union losses by mobilizing support throughout the North. Union forces targeted infrastructure—plantations, railroads, and bridges—to weaken the South's morale and fighting ability. While Lincoln sanctioned this approach, he emphasized the defeat of the Confederate armies over destruction for its own sake. Grant's bloody Overland Campaign turned into a strategic success for the Union despite a number of setbacks. But the campaign was the bloodiest in American history: approximately 55,000 casualties on the Union side (including 7,600 deaths), compared to about 33,000 on the Confederate (including 4,200 deaths). Lee's losses, although lower in absolute numbers, were proportionately higher (over 50%) than Grant's (about 45%). In early April, the Confederate government evacuated Richmond and Lincoln visited the conquered capital.

Amid the turmoil of military actions, on June 30, 1864, Lincoln signed into law the Yosemite Grant, which provided unprecedented federal protection for the area now known as Yosemite National Park. According to Rolf Diamant and Ethan Carr, "the Yosemite Grant was a direct consequence of the war ... an embodiment of the ongoing process of remaking government ... an intentional assertion of a steadfast belief in the eventual Union victory."

==== Fiscal and monetary policy ====
Lincoln and Secretary of the Treasury Salmon Chase faced a challenge in funding a wartime economy. Congress quickly approved Lincoln's request to assemble an army, even increasing his proposed 400,000 soldiers to 500,000, but both Congress and Chase initially resisted raising taxes. After the Union defeat at the First Battle of Bull Run, which collapsed the bond market, Congress passed the Revenue Act of 1861. This act imposed the first U.S. federal income tax, creating a flat tax of three percent on annual incomes above $800 ($28,700 in 2025 dollars). The preference for taxation based on income rather than property reflected the increasing amount of wealth held in stocks and bonds; for example, Representative Schuyler Colfax declared during the debate, "I cannot go home and tell my constituents that I voted for a bill that would allow a man, a millionaire, who has put his entire property into stock, to be exempt from taxation, while a farmer who lives by his side must pay a tax". As the average urban worker made approximately $600 per year, many were not required to pay income taxes. (Note: In 1866, when income tax applied to those with incomes above $600, only an estimated 1.3% of the national population were required to pay.) Lincoln also signed increases to the Morrill Tariff, which had become law in the final months of Buchanan's tenure. These tariffs raised import duties considerably and were designed both to increase revenue and to help manufacturers offset the burden of new taxes. Throughout the war, Congress debated whether to raise additional revenue primarily by increasing tariff rates, which most strongly affected rural areas, or by increasing income taxes, which most affected wealthier individuals; the latter view proved more popular.

The revenue measures of 1861 proved inadequate for funding the war, forcing Congress to take further action. In February 1862, Congress passed the Legal Tender Act, which authorized the printing of $150 million in "greenbacks"—the first banknotes issued by the U.S. government since the end of the American Revolution. Greenbacks were not backed by gold or silver, but rather by the government's promise to honor their value. By the end of the war, $450 million worth of greenbacks were in circulation. (Note: Government borrowing amounted to $2.8 billion by 1866.) Congress also passed the Revenue Act of 1862, which established an excise tax affecting nearly every commodity, as well as the first national inheritance tax. It also added a progressive tax structure to the federal income tax. To collect these taxes, Congress created the Office of the Commissioner of Internal Revenue, and Lincoln appointed George S. Boutwell as the first commissioner.

Despite the new revenue measures, funding the war remained challenging. The government continued to issue greenbacks and borrow large amounts of money, and the U.S. national debt grew from $65 million in 1860 to over $2 billion in 1866. The Revenue Act of 1864 represented a compromise between those who favored a more progressive tax structure and those who favored a flat tax. It established a five-percent tax on incomes above $600 and a ten-percent tax on incomes above $10,000, and it raised taxes on businesses. In early 1865, Congress reduced the threshold for ten-percent taxation to incomes above $5000. By the end of the war, the income tax constituted about one-fifth of the federal government's revenue, though it was intended as a temporary wartime measure.

Lincoln also took action against wartime fraud, signing into law the False Claims Act of 1863. This statute imposed penalties for false claims and made it possible for private citizens to file false-claim (qui tam) lawsuits on behalf of the U.S. government and share in the recovery. Hoping to stabilize the currency, Lincoln convinced Congress to pass the National Banking Act in 1863, established the Office of the Comptroller of the Currency to oversee "national banks," which were subject to federal, rather than state, regulation. In return for investing a third of their capital in federal bonds, national banks were authorized to issue federal banknotes. After Congress imposed a tax on private banknotes in March 1865, federal banknotes became the dominant form of paper currency.

Other economic policies passed under Lincoln included the 1862 Homestead Act, which made millions of acres of government-held land in the West available for purchase at low cost. The 1862 Morrill Land-Grant Colleges Act provided government grants for agricultural colleges in each state. The Pacific Railway Acts of 1862 and 1864 granted federal support for the construction of the United States' first transcontinental railroad, which was completed in 1869.

==== Foreign policy ====
At the start of the war, Russia was the lone great power to support the Union, while the other European powers had varying degrees of sympathy for the Confederacy. According to the historian Dean Mahin, Lincoln had "limited familiarity with diplomatic practices" but exerted "substantial influence on U.S. diplomacy" as the Union attempted to avoid war with Britain and France. Lincoln appointed diplomats to try to persuade European nations not to recognize the Confederacy. Lincoln's policy succeeded: all foreign nations were officially neutral throughout the Civil War, with none recognizing the Confederacy. Some European leaders looked for ways to exploit the inability of the U.S. to enforce the Monroe Doctrine opposing European colonial intervention in the Americas: Spain invaded the Dominican Republic in 1861, while France established a puppet regime in Mexico. However, many in Europe also hoped for a quick end to the war, both for humanitarian reasons and because of the economic disruption it caused.

The European aristocracy was "absolutely gleeful in pronouncing the American debacle as proof that the entire experiment in popular government had failed", according to Don H. Doyle. Union diplomats initially had to explain that the United States was not committed to ending slavery, and instead they argued that secession was unconstitutional. Confederate spokesmen were more successful by ignoring slavery and instead focusing on their struggle for independence, their commitment to free trade, and the essential role of cotton in the European economy. The Confederacy's hope that cotton exports would compel European interference did not come to fruition, as Britain found alternative sources and maintained economic ties with the Union. Though the issuance of the Emancipation Proclamation in January 1863 did not immediately end the possibility of European intervention, it rallied European public opinion to the Union by adding abolition as a Union war goal. Any chance of a European intervention in the war ended with the Union victories at Gettysburg and Vicksburg in July 1863, as European leaders came to believe that the Confederate cause was doomed.

==== Native Americans ====
Lincoln appointed William P. Dole as commissioner of the Bureau of Indian Affairs and made "extensive use of Indian Service positions to reward political supporters", according to the historian Thomas Britten. Lincoln's policies largely focused on assimilation of Native Americans and diminishing tribal landholdings, consistent with those of his predecessors, but his direct involvement in Native American affairs was unclear. His administration faced difficulties guarding Western settlers, railroads, and telegraph lines from Native American attacks.

Tensions arose with the Dakota people due to American treaty violations, unfair trading, and government practices that led to starvation. In August 1862, the Dakota War broke out in Minnesota. Hundreds of settlers were killed and 30,000 were displaced from their homes. Some feared incorrectly that it might represent a Confederate conspiracy to start a war on the Northwestern frontier. Lincoln ordered thousands of paroled prisoners of war be sent to put down the uprising. When the Confederacy protested, Lincoln revoked the policy and none arrived in Minnesota. Lincoln sent Pope as commander of the new Department of the Northwest.

Appointed as a state militia colonel, Henry Hastings Sibley eventually defeated the Dakota chief Little Crow at the Battle of Wood Lake. A war crimes trial led by Sibley sentenced 303 Dakota warriors to death; the legal scholar Carol Chomsky described the trial as "a study in military injustice" designed to "guarantee an unjust outcome". Lincoln pardoned all but 39 of the condemned warriors, and, with one execution suspended, the remaining 38 were hanged in the largest mass execution in U.S. history.

Congressman Alexander Ramsey told Lincoln in 1864 that he would have received more re-election support in Minnesota had he executed all 303 warriors. Lincoln responded, "I could not afford to hang men for votes." Lincoln called for reform of federal Indian policy but prioritized the war and Reconstruction. Changes were made in response to the Sand Creek Massacre of November 1864, prioritizing peaceful administration of Native affairs and condemning those encroaching on Native territory, but not until after Lincoln's death.

=== Second term ===
==== Re-election ====
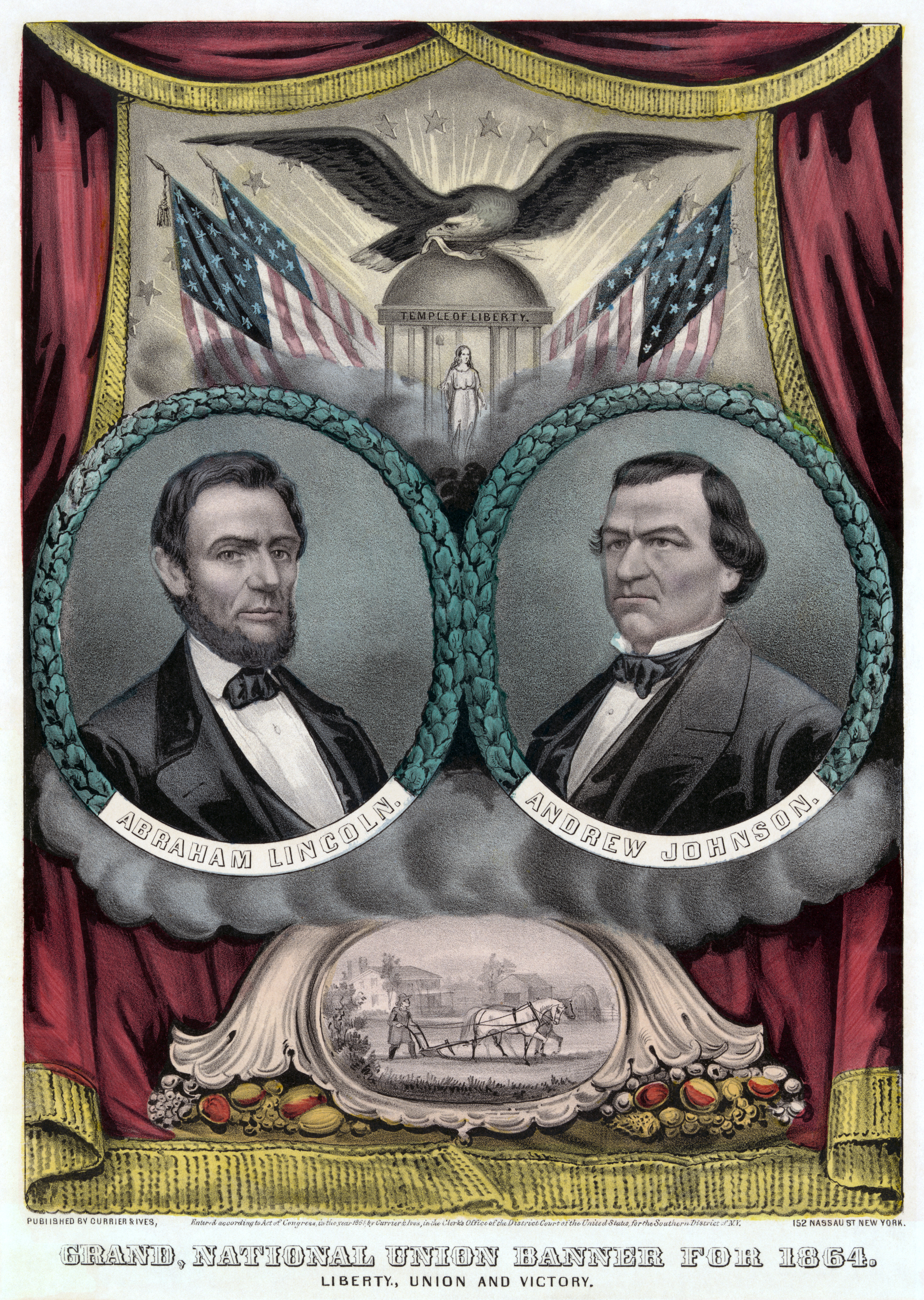
Republican poster for the 1864 election

Lincoln ran for re-election in 1864; the Democratic nominee was former general McClellan. The Republican Party selected Andrew Johnson, a War Democrat, as Lincoln's running mate. To broaden his coalition to include War Democrats as well as Republicans, Lincoln ran under the new label of the National Union Party. Grant's bloody stalemates and Confederate victories such as the Battle of the Crater damaged Lincoln's re-election prospects, and many Republicans feared defeat. Lincoln prepared a confidential memorandum pledging that, if he should lose the election, he would "co-operate with the President-elect, as to save the Union between the election and the inauguration; as he will have secured his election on such ground that he cannot possibly save it afterwards".

Victories at Atlanta in September and in the Shenandoah Valley in October turned public opinion, and Lincoln was re-elected with 55.1 percent of the popular vote as well as 212 electoral votes to McClellan's 21. As Grant continued to weaken Lee's forces, efforts to discuss peace began. On February 3, 1865, Alexander H. Stephens, the Confederate vice president, and two other Confederate officials met with Lincoln and Seward at Hampton Roads. Lincoln refused to negotiate with the Confederacy as a coequal, and the only agreement reached at the meeting concerned the exchange of prisoners.

Map of the results of the election, 1864

Lincoln's second inauguration took place on March 4, 1865; historian Mark Noll places his second inaugural address "among the small handful of semi-sacred texts by which Americans conceive their place in the world"; it is inscribed in the Lincoln Memorial. Lincoln closed his speech with these words:

With malice toward none; with charity for all; with firmness in the right, as God gives us to see the right, let us strive on to finish the work we are in; to bind up the nation's wounds; to care for him who shall have borne the battle, and for his widow, and his orphan—to do all which may achieve and cherish a just and lasting peace, among ourselves, and with all nations.

A month later, on April 9, Lee surrendered to Grant at Appomattox, signaling the end of the war. It triggered a series of subsequent surrenders across the South—in North Carolina, Alabama, and the trans-Mississippi Theater—and finally at sea with the surrender of the CSS Shenandoah in November 1865.

==== Reconstruction ====
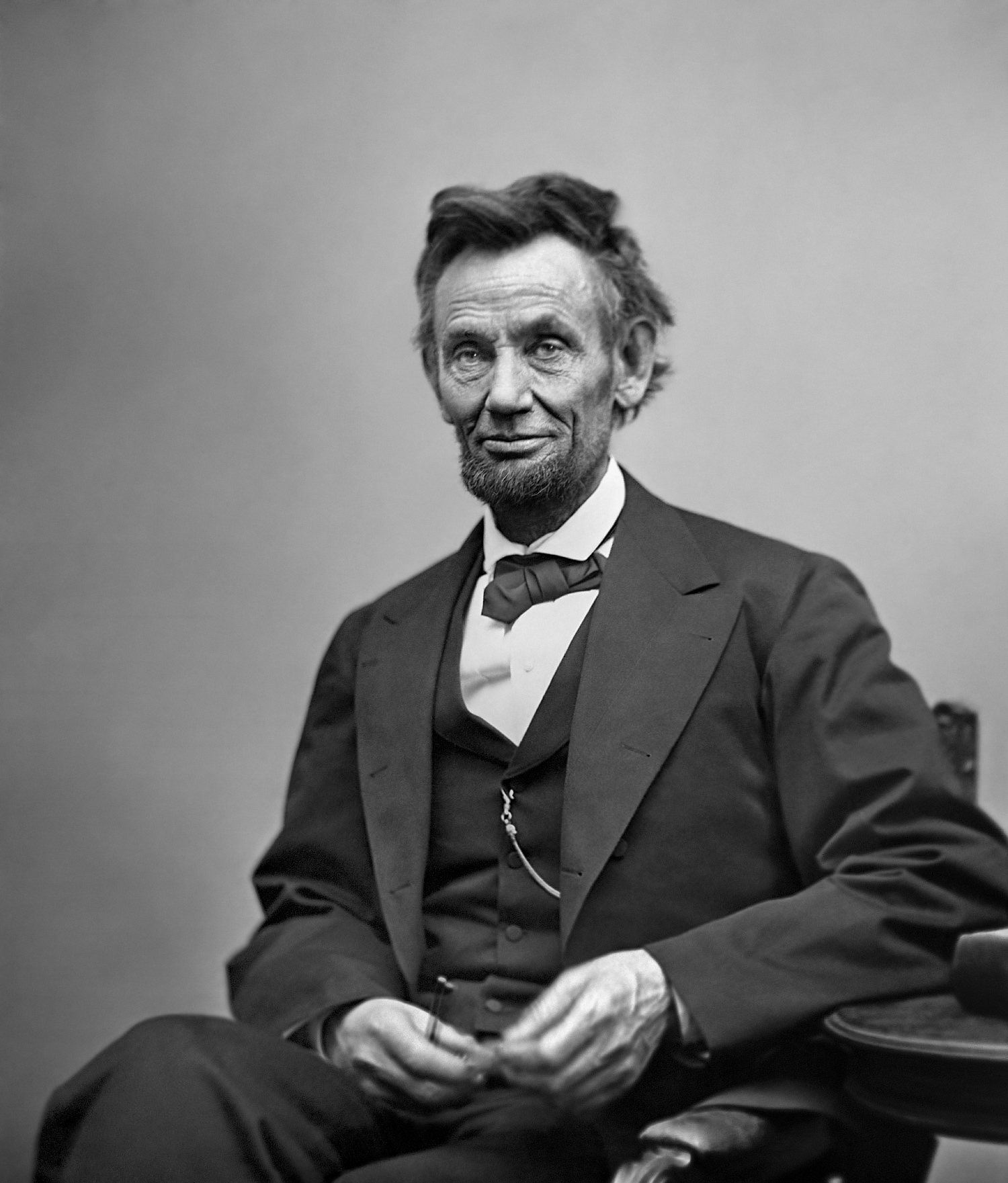
A portrait of Lincoln on February 5, 1865

Reconstruction began before the war's end, as Lincoln and his associates considered the reintegration of the nation, and the fates of Confederate leaders and freed slaves. When a general asked Lincoln how the defeated Confederates were to be treated, Lincoln replied, "Let 'em up easy"; he focused not on blame for the war but on rebuilding. Determined to reunite the nation and not alienate the South, Lincoln urged that speedy elections under generous terms be held. His Amnesty Proclamation of December 8, 1863, offered pardons to those who had not held a Confederate civil office and had not mistreated Union prisoners, if they signed an oath of allegiance. Lincoln led the moderates in Reconstruction policy and was opposed by the Radicals, under Thaddeus Stevens, Charles Sumner and Benjamin Wade, who otherwise remained Lincoln's allies.

As Southern states fell, they needed leaders while their administrations were being restored. In Tennessee and Arkansas, Lincoln appointed Andrew Johnson and Frederick Steele, respectively, as military governors. In Louisiana, Lincoln ordered Nathaniel P. Banks to promote a plan that would reestablish statehood when 10 percent of the voters agreed, but only if the reconstructed states abolished slavery. Democratic opponents accused Lincoln of using the plan to ensure his and the Republicans' political aspirations. The Radicals denounced his policy as too lenient and passed their own plan, the 1864 Wade–Davis Bill, but Lincoln pocket-vetoed it. The Radicals retaliated by refusing to seat elected representatives from Louisiana, Arkansas, and Tennessee.

After implementing the Emancipation Proclamation, Lincoln increased pressure on Congress to outlaw slavery nationwide with a constitutional amendment. By December 1863 an amendment was brought to Congress. The Senate passed it on April 8, 1864, but the first vote in the House of Representatives fell short of the required two-thirds majority. Passage became part of Lincoln's re-election platform, and after his re-election, the second attempt in the House passed on January 31, 1865. After ratification by three-fourths of the states in December 1865, it became the Thirteenth Amendment to the United States Constitution, abolishing "slavery [and] involuntary servitude, except as a punishment for crime".

Lincoln announced a Reconstruction plan that involved short-term military administration, pending readmission under the control of southern Unionists. He also signed Senator Charles Sumner's Freedmen's Bureau bill that set up a temporary federal agency designed to meet the immediate needs of former slaves. The law opened land for a lease of three years with the ability for the freedmen to purchase title. In signing it, according to the historian Richard Carwardine, Lincoln "acknowledged that the government had at least some responsibility for the material needs of millions of ex-slaves", although it fell short of the "forty acres and a mule" that many slaves understood they would receive from confiscated property.

Eric Foner argues that "Lincoln did not see Reconstruction as an opportunity for a sweeping political and social revolution beyond emancipation. He had long made clear his opposition to the confiscation and redistribution of land." However, the Lincoln scholar Phillip S. Paludan suggests that at the end of his life Lincoln was moving towards a more radical position, particularly with regards to freedmen's rights. Foner adds that, had Lincoln lived into the Reconstruction era, "It is entirely plausible to imagine Lincoln and Congress agreeing on a Reconstruction policy that encompassed federal protection for basic civil rights plus limited black suffrage, along the lines Lincoln proposed just before his death."

== Assassination ==
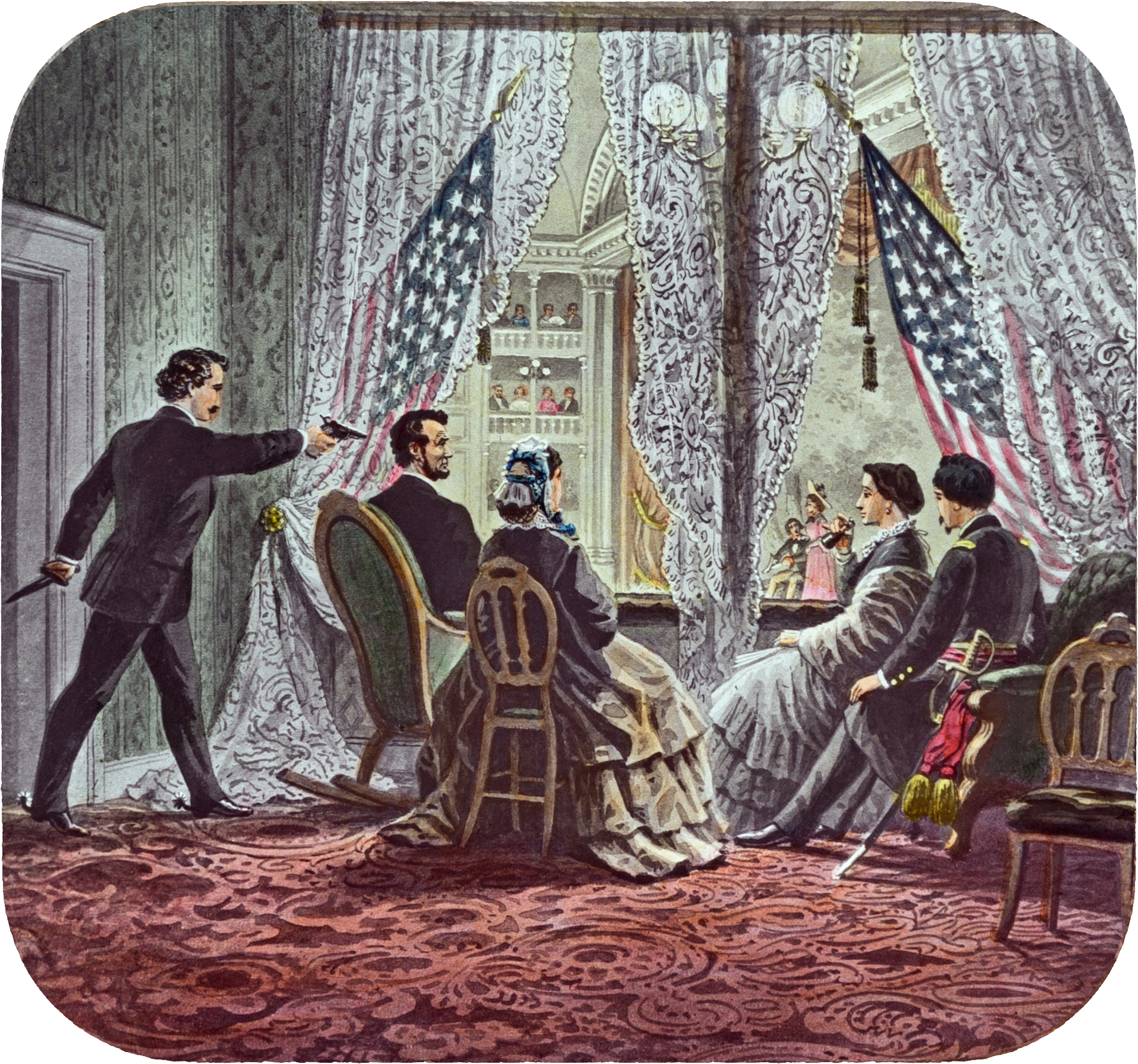
An illustration of Lincoln's assassination on April 14, 1865, in the presidential booth at Ford's Theatre, featuring (left to right): assassin John Wilkes Booth, Abraham Lincoln, Mary Todd Lincoln, Clara Harris, and Henry Rathbone

John Wilkes Booth was a well-known actor and a Confederate spy from Maryland; although he never joined the Confederate army, he had contacts within the Confederate secret service. After attending Lincoln's last public address, on April 11, 1865, in which Lincoln expressed his view that the franchise should be conferred on some Black men, specifically "on the very intelligent, and on those who serve our cause as soldiers", Booth plotted to assassinate the President. When Booth learned of the Lincolns' intention to attend a play with Grant, he planned to assassinate Lincoln and Grant at Ford's Theatre. Lincoln and his wife attended the play Our American Cousin on the evening of April 14. At the last minute, Grant decided to go to New Jersey to visit his children instead.

At 10:15 pm, Booth entered Lincoln's theater box, crept up from behind, and fired at the back of Lincoln's head, mortally wounding him. Lincoln's guest, Major Henry Rathbone, momentarily grappled with Booth, but Booth stabbed him and escaped. After being attended by Charles Leale and two other doctors, Lincoln was taken across the street to Petersen House. He remained in a coma for nine hours and died at 7:22 am on April 15. Lincoln's body was wrapped in a flag and placed in a coffin, which was loaded into a hearse and escorted to the White House by Union soldiers. Johnson was sworn in as president later that day. Two weeks later, Booth was located, shot, and killed at a farm in Virginia by Sergeant Boston Corbett.

=== Funeral and burial ===
From April 19 to 20, Lincoln lay in state, first in the White House and then in the Capitol rotunda. The caskets containing Lincoln's body and the body of his third son Willie then traveled for two weeks on a funeral train following a circuitous route from Washington D.C. to Springfield, Illinois, stopping at several cities for memorials attended by hundreds of thousands. Many others gathered along the tracks as the train passed with bands, bonfires, and hymn singing or in silent grief.

Historians emphasized the widespread shock and sorrow, but noted that some who had hated Lincoln celebrated his death. Walt Whitman composed four elegies to Lincoln, including "When Lilacs Last in the Dooryard Bloom'd" and "O Captain! My Captain!". Lincoln's body was buried at Oak Ridge Cemetery in Springfield and now lies within the Lincoln Tomb.

== Philosophy and views ==
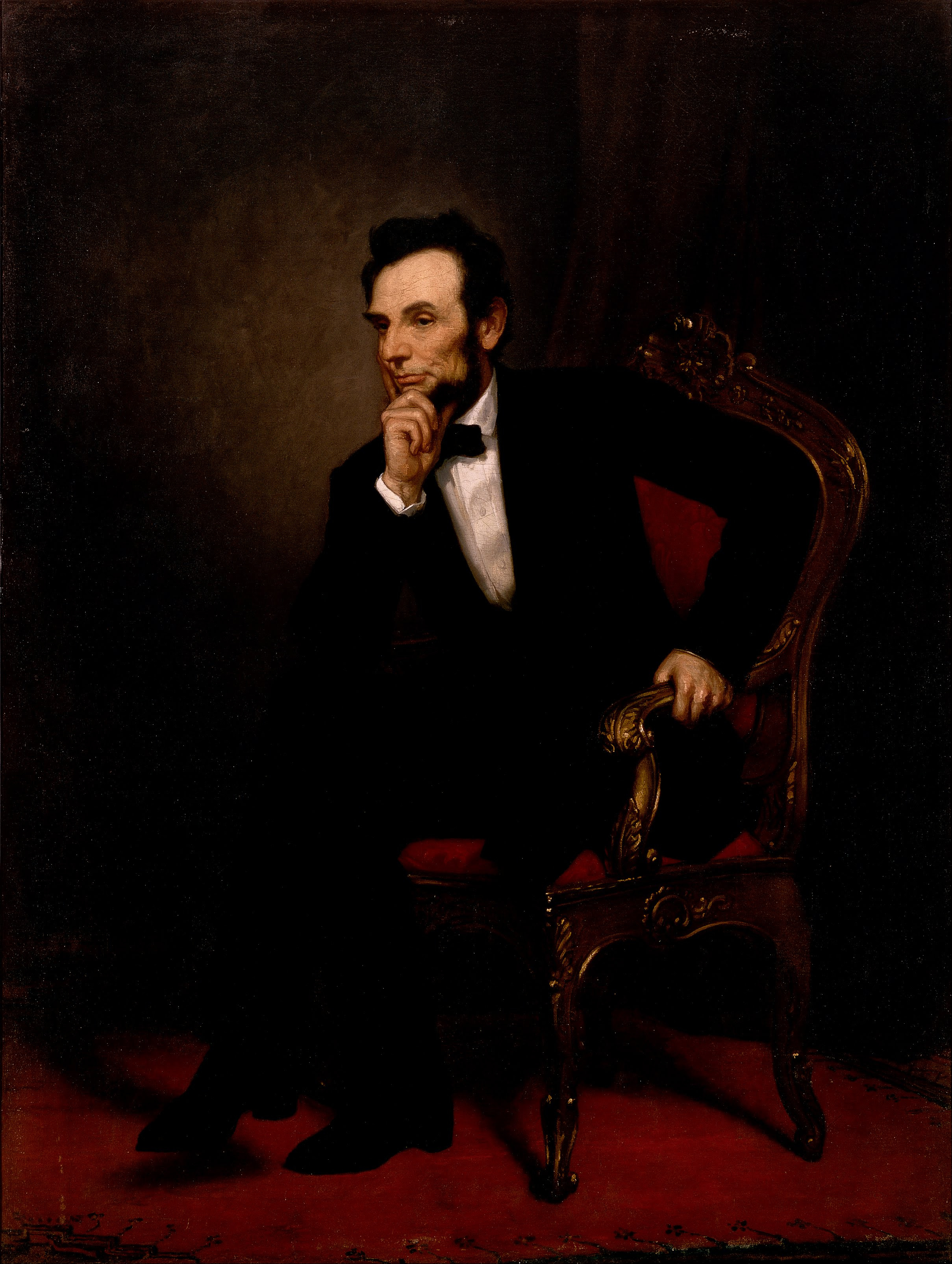
Abraham Lincoln, an 1869 oil-on-canvas painting by George Peter Alexander Healy

Lincoln redefined the political philosophy of republicanism in the United States. Because the Declaration of Independence says that all men have an unalienable right to life, liberty and the pursuit of happiness, he called it the "sheet anchor" of republicanism, at a time when the Constitution was the focus of most political discourse. He presented the Declaration as establishing equality as a foundational principle for the United States, which had a significant impact on social and political movements in the U.S. into the 20th century.

As a Whig activist, Lincoln was a spokesman for business interests, favoring high tariffs, banks, infrastructure improvements, and railroads, in opposition to Jacksonian democrats. Nevertheless, Lincoln admired Andrew Jackson's steeliness and patriotism, and adopted the Jacksonian "belief in the common man". According to historian Sean Wilentz, "just as the Republican Party of the 1850s absorbed certain elements of Jacksonianism, so Lincoln, whose Whiggery had always been more egalitarian than that of other Whigs, found himself absorbing some of them as well."

Historian William C. Harris found that Lincoln's "reverence for the Founding Fathers, the Constitution, the laws under it, and the preservation of the Republic and its institutions strengthened his conservatism." In Lincoln's first inaugural address, he denounced secession as anarchy and argued that "a majority held in restraint by constitutional checks, and limitations, and always changing easily with deliberate changes of popular opinions and sentiments, is the only true sovereign of a free people."

=== Religious views ===
As a young man, Lincoln was a religious skeptic. However, he was deeply familiar with the Bible; throughout his public career, he often quoted scripture. His three most famous speeches—the House Divided Speech, the Gettysburg Address, and his second inaugural address—all contain such quotes. In the 1840s, Lincoln subscribed to the Doctrine of Necessity, a belief that the human mind was controlled by a higher power.

After the death of his son Edward in 1850, Lincoln more frequently expressed a dependence on God. He never joined a church, although he and his wife frequently attended First Presbyterian Church in Springfield, Illinois, beginning in 1852. While president, Lincoln often attended services at the New York Avenue Presbyterian Church in Washington, D.C. The death of his son Willie in February 1862 may have caused him to look toward religion for solace.

Lincoln's frequent use of religious imagery and language toward the end of his life may have reflected his own personal beliefs or might have been a device to reach his audiences, who were mostly evangelical Protestants. Sources differ in how they describe his religious beliefs. His law partner William Herndon gave a lecture after Lincoln's death stating that he was an "unbeliever"; James Smith, the pastor of First Presbyterian Church in Springfield, responded to this lecture with an open letter asserting that Lincoln "did avow his belief in the Divine Authority and the Inspiration of the Scriptures". Stephen Mansfield describes "an atheist or religiously skeptical Lincoln" as "the prevailing view", although he argues that "there was a spiritual journey of some kind in Abraham Lincoln's life". Richard Carwardine writes that "Many elements of the inner Lincoln, including his personal faith ... necessarily remain a puzzle". Lincoln's last words were, as reported by his wife, "There is no place I so much desire to see as Jerusalem".

== Health and appearance ==
According to Michael Burlingame, Lincoln was described as "awkward" and "gawky" as a youth. In adolescence he was tall and strong, participating in jumping, throwing, wrestling, and footraces, and demonstrating exceptional strength. Burlingame notes that Lincoln's clothes "were typically rough and suited to the frontier", with a gap between his shoes, socks, and pants that often exposed six or more inches of his shin; "he cared little about fashion".

Lincoln was a slender six feet four inches, with a high-pitched voice. Though often portrayed bearded, he did not grow a beard until 1860 at the suggestion of 11-year-old Grace Bedell; he was the first U.S. president to do so. William H. Herndon described Lincoln's face as "long, narrow, sallow, and cadaverous", his cheeks as "leathery and saffron-colored". Lincoln described himself as having a "dark complexion, with coarse black hair". Although Lincoln's features were said to be "unpleasant to behold," Walt Whitman "wrote that Lincoln's face was 'so awful ugly it becomes beautiful.'" Lincoln's detractors also remarked on his appearance. For example, the Charleston Mercury described him as having "the dirtiest complexion" and asked "Faugh! after him what decent white man would be President?"

Among the illnesses that Lincoln is either documented or speculated to have suffered from are depression, smallpox, and malaria. He took blue mass pills, which contained mercury, to treat melancholy or hypochondriasis; this could have resulted in mercury poisoning. Several claims have been made that Lincoln's health was declining before his assassination, as photographs of Lincoln appear to show weight loss and facial changes. It has been proposed that he could have had a rare genetic disorder such as Marfan syndrome or multiple endocrine neoplasia type 2B.

== Legacy ==
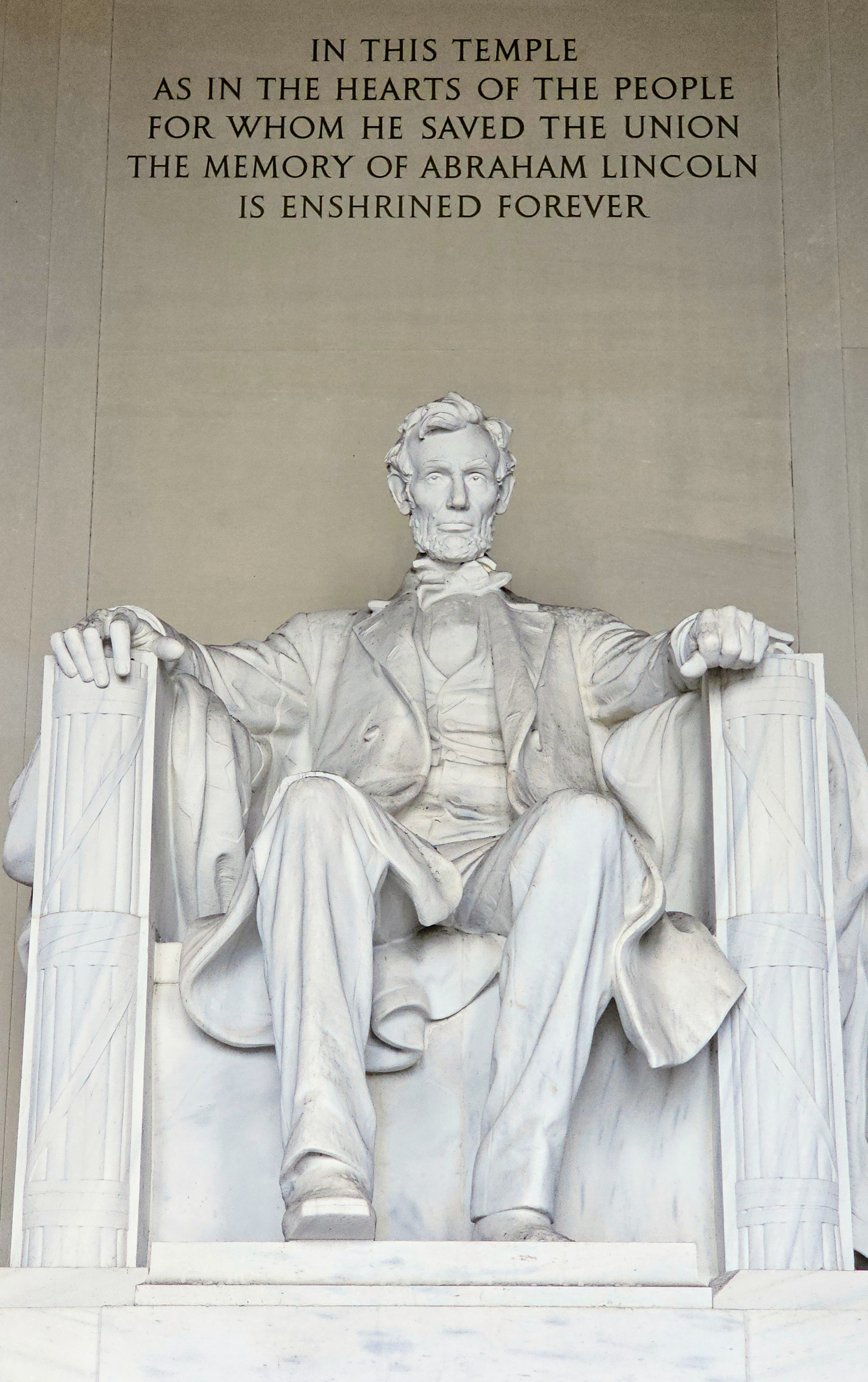
Abraham Lincoln, by Daniel Chester French, in 1920

=== Historical reputation ===
In surveys of U.S. scholars ranking presidents since 1948, the top three presidents are generally Lincoln, George Washington, and Franklin D. Roosevelt, although the order varies. A 2004 study found that scholars in history and politics ranked Lincoln number one, while legal scholars placed him second after Washington. Between 1999 and 2011, Lincoln, John F. Kennedy, and Ronald Reagan were the top-ranked presidents in eight public opinion surveys by Gallup.

Lincoln's assassination made him a national martyr. He was viewed by abolitionists as a champion of human liberty. Many, though not all, in the South considered Lincoln to be a man of outstanding ability. In the New Deal era, liberals honored Lincoln as an advocate of the common man who they claimed would have supported the welfare state, and Lincoln became a favorite of liberal intellectuals across the world. The sociologist Barry Schwartz argues that in the 1930s and 1940s, Lincoln provided the nation with "a moral symbol inspiring and guiding American life." Schwartz states that Lincoln's American reputation grew slowly from the late 19th century until the Progressive Era (1900–1920s), when he emerged as one of America's most venerated heroes, even among White Southerners. The high point came in 1922 with the dedication of the Lincoln Memorial on the National Mall in Washington, D.C.

In 2008, Schwartz argued that Lincoln's symbolic power has lost relevance since World War II, and this "fading hero is symptomatic of fading confidence in national greatness." By the 1970s, Lincoln had become a hero to political conservatives—apart from neo-Confederates such as Mel Bradford, who denounced his treatment of the White South—for his nationalism, his support for business, his insistence on stopping the spread of slavery, and his perceived devotion to the principles of the Founding Fathers.

The Black orator and former slave Frederick Douglass stated that in "his company, I was never reminded of my humble origin, or of my unpopular color", and Lincoln has long been known as the Great Emancipator. (Note: The origin of the nickname is unknown.) By the late 1960s, some Black intellectuals denied that Lincoln deserved that title. Lerone Bennett Jr. won wide attention when he called Lincoln a White supremacist in 1968. He noted that Lincoln used ethnic slurs and argued that Lincoln opposed social equality and proposed that freed slaves voluntarily move to another country. Defenders of Lincoln highlighted his condemnation of slavery and his contributions to its abolition, casting his delays and racist rhetoric as concessions to political necessity rather than reflections of his personal beliefs.

Lincoln has also been characterized as a folk hero and as "Honest Abe". David Herbert Donald opined in his 1996 biography that Lincoln was endowed with the personality trait of negative capability, attributed to extraordinary leaders who were "capable of being in uncertainties ... without any irritable reaching after fact and reason". Lincoln has often been portrayed by Hollywood, almost always in a flattering light; the film historian Melvyn Stokes writes that "moviemakers have commonly used Lincoln primarily as a metaphor for ideas and values they approved". Lincoln has also been admired by political figures outside the U.S., including the German philosopher Karl Marx; Giuseppe Garibaldi, leader of the Italian Risorgimento; Indian independence leader Mahatma Gandhi; German politician Willy Brandt; and Nelson Mandela, who likened the "new birth of freedom" Lincoln spoke of in the Gettysburg Address to the end of apartheid in South Africa.

=== Memorials and commemorations ===
Lincoln's portrait appears on two denominations of United States currency, the penny and the $5 bill. He appears on postage stamps across the world, including in Ghana, Honduras, China, Haiti, Nicaragua, Colombia, and Argentina. He has been memorialized in many town, city, and county names, including the capital of Nebraska. The United States Navy has named three vessels after Lincoln, including the Nimitz-class aircraft carrier USS Abraham Lincoln (CVN-72). The Lincoln Memorial in Washington, D.C., is one of the most visited National Park Service sites in the country.

Memorials in Springfield, Illinois, include the Abraham Lincoln Presidential Library and Museum, Lincoln's home, and his tomb. A carving of Lincoln appears with those of three other presidents on Mount Rushmore, which receives about 3 million visitors a year. A statue of Lincoln completed by Augustus Saint-Gaudens stands in Lincoln Park, Chicago, with recastings given as diplomatic gifts standing in Parliament Square, London, and Parque Lincoln, Mexico City. Several states commemorate "Presidents' Day" as "Washington–Lincoln Day".

Lincoln has been extensively portrayed in media. Early works, such as Abraham Lincoln's Clemency (1910), attempted to mythologize him, emphasizing his mercifulness. Works from the Great Depression era, such as Young Mr. Lincoln (1939), embellished his early struggles and folksiness. The 1938 play Abe Lincoln in Illinois won a Pulitzer Prize and was adapted in film. After a marked decrease in film portrayals between 1941 and 1999, Daniel Day-Lewis won the Academy Award for Best Actor for his portrayal in Lincoln, a 2012 biographical film directed by Steven Spielberg. The Metropolitan Opera commissioned Missy Mazzoli and Royce Vavrek to adapt the novel Lincoln in the Bardo into an opera, which premiered in October 2026.

== See also ==
- Outline of Abraham Lincoln
- Lincoln family
- Walt Whitman and Abraham Lincoln

== Notes ==
U.S. House of Representatives
Preceded by John Henry	Member of the U.S. House of Representatives from Illinois's 7th congressional district 1847–1849	Succeeded by Thomas Harris
Party political offices
Preceded by John Frémont	Republican nominee for President of the United States; 1860, 1864	Succeeded by Ulysses Grant
Political offices
Preceded by James Buchanan	President of the United States; 1861–1865	Succeeded by Andrew Johnson
Honorary titles
Preceded by Henry Clay	Persons who have lain in state or honor in the United States Capitol rotunda 1865	Succeeded by Thaddeus Stevens
