= Mordecai Lincoln House =

Mordecai Lincoln House may refer to:

- Mordecai Lincoln House (Springfield, Kentucky), listed on the NRHP in Kentucky
- Mordecai Lincoln House (Lorane, Pennsylvania), listed on the NRHP in Pennsylvania
