= Samuel Lincoln =

Ancestor of Abraham Lincoln (1622–1690)

- Born: 24 August 1622; Hingham, Norfolk, England
- Died: 26 May 1690 (aged 67); Hingham, Massachusetts Bay Colony, English America
- Children: Samuel, Daniel, Mordecai, Mary, Thomas, Martha, Sarah, Rebecca
- Parent: Edward Lincoln
- Relatives: Captain Abraham Lincoln (3rd great grandson) Mordecai Lincoln (3rd great grandson); Mary Lincoln (3rd great granddaughter); Thomas Lincoln (2nd great grandson); Abraham Lincoln (4th great grandson); Robert Todd Lincoln (5th great grandson); Edward Baker Lincoln (5th great grandson); William Wallace Lincoln (5th great grandson) Thomas “Tad” Lincoln (5th great grandson)

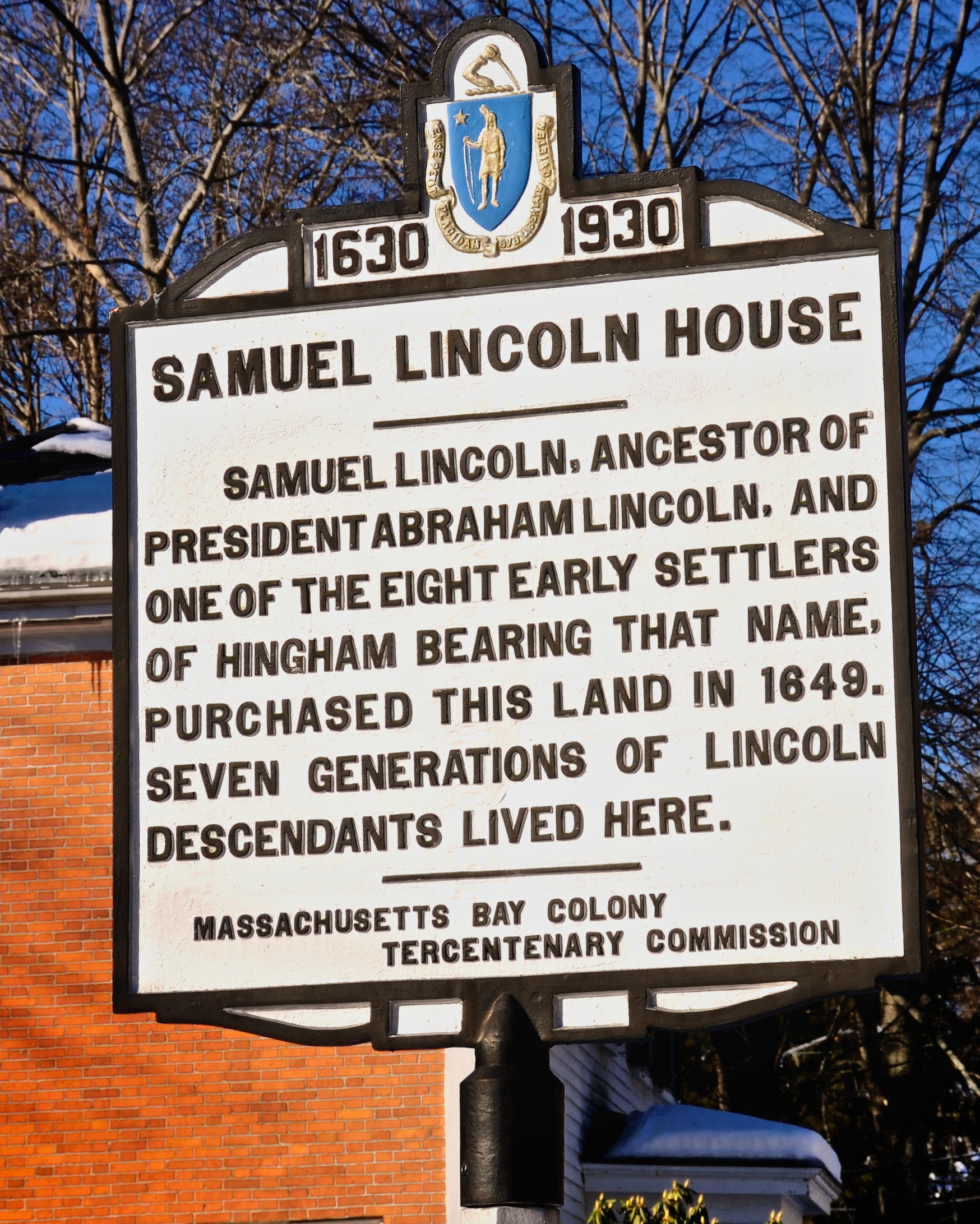
Historical marker, Samuel Lincoln House, Hingham, Massachusetts

Samuel Lincoln (24 August 1622 – 26 May 1690) was an Englishman and progenitor of many notable United States political figures, including his 4th-great-grandson President Abraham Lincoln and his 3rd-great-grandson Maine governor Enoch Lincoln. His 2nd-great-grandson Levi Lincoln Sr. and 3rd-great-grandson Levi Lincoln Jr. each served as Massachusetts Representatives, Governor and Lieutenant Governor. Because of Samuel Lincoln's descendants, his fortuitous arrival in the Massachusetts Bay Colony, and the fact that his ancestry is known for several generations, he is considered the father of the most prominent branch of Lincolns in the United States.

== Journey to America ==
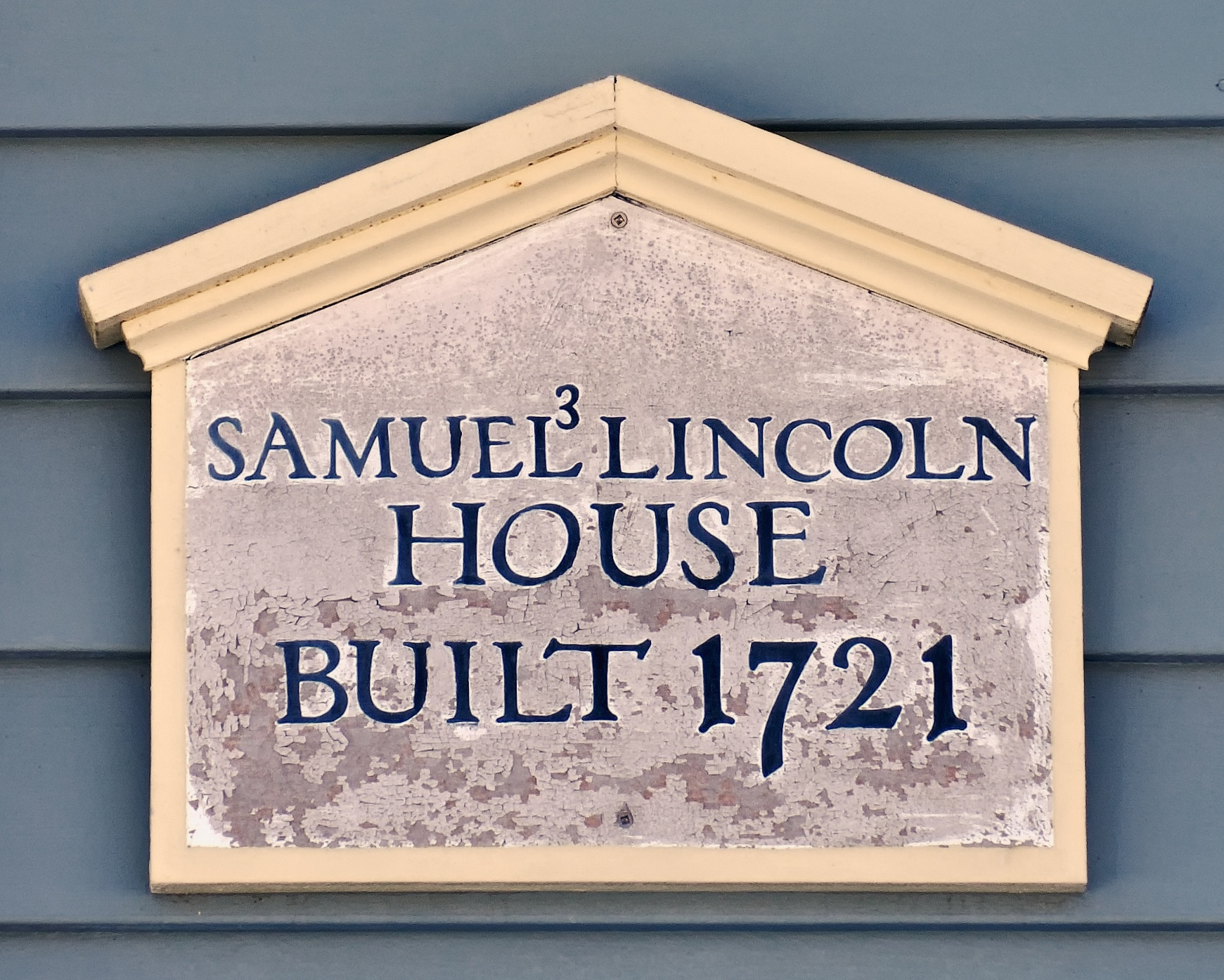
Samuel Lincoln House, Hingham, Massachusetts, built by grandson of immigrant Samuel on land he purchased

Having grown up in meager circumstances due to a family squabble in which his wealthy grandfather disinherited his earlier children, Samuel Lincoln became an apprentice weaver under Francis Lawes of Norwich, England. Samuel Lincoln's father Edward had abandoned his home at Swanton Morley near Hingham after he was cut out of his father Richard's will, and relocated to some small acreage at Hingham. In 1637, Lincoln left England for the New World with Lawes' family, embarking on a ship named John & Dorothy. Although most accounts indicate that he was 15 years old at the time, it has been suggested that he misrepresented his age in order to be permitted to make the voyage.

Samuel's older brother Thomas is known in early records as "Thomas Lincoln the Weaver" to distinguish him from several other unrelated Thomas Lincolns. In 1635, Thomas settled in Hingham, Massachusetts where the town granted him a house lot. Although twice married, Thomas had no children. Samuel sailed for the colony of Massachusetts. After Thomas’ death, he left a great deal of his property, including several house lots, to Samuel and his nephews.

== Life and family in Massachusetts ==
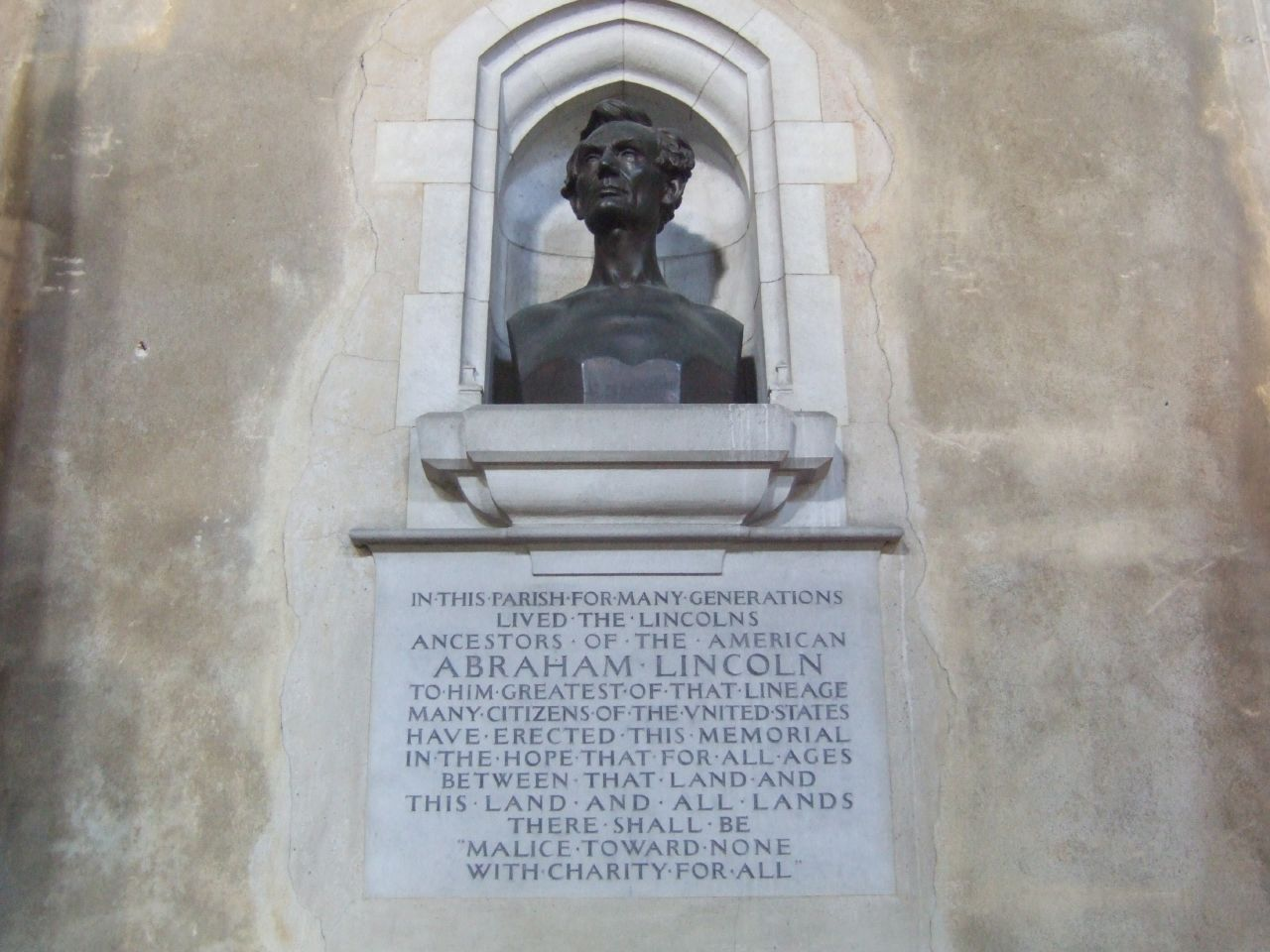
Bust of Abraham Lincoln, descendant of Samuel, St. Andrew's Church, Hingham, Norfolk, England

Samuel Lincoln helped build the Old Ship Church in Hingham. He married Martha Lyford of Ireland around 1649, possibly the daughter of the Rev. John Lyford, and the couple had 11 children, three of whom died in infancy, but another three of whom lived into their eighties. Lincoln's eldest son, born August 25, 1650, was also named Samuel. The emigrant Samuel Lincoln's fourth son was Mordecai Lincoln, who became a blacksmith, and who was the ancestor of Abraham Lincoln. Genealogists have noted the common and repeated use of certain Biblical names in the Lincoln family, particularly Abraham, Samuel, Isaac, Jacob, and Mordecai, a common practice among early Puritan settlers in the Massachusetts Bay Colony. Many later Lincoln descendants, including the original immigrant's son, were named Samuel in succeeding generations.

Samuel's mother also belonged to a family long associated with the American government: the Gilmans of Exeter, New Hampshire. Samuel's mother Bridget Gilman was the daughter of Edward Gilman of Hingham, Norfolk, England, whose son Edward Gilman Jr. emigrated to Hingham, Massachusetts, later to Ipswich, Massachusetts, and finally to Exeter, where he and his family became prominent businessmen, elected officials and, later, ardent Revolutionary War patriots. Nicholas Gilman, a signer of the U.S. Constitution, was a member of this family.

== Commemoration ==
In 1937, the 300th anniversary of Samuel Lincoln's arrival in Massachusetts was commemorated with the dedication of a tablet at the Old Ship Church in Hingham, Massachusetts. President Abraham Lincoln is honored by a bust in the church of St Andrew's in Hingham, Norfolk, England, unveiled in a 1919 ceremony by then-American Ambassador John W. Davis. Samuel Lincoln's father Edward, who remained in Hingham, England, died on 11 February 1640, and was buried in the graveyard of St Andrew's Church.

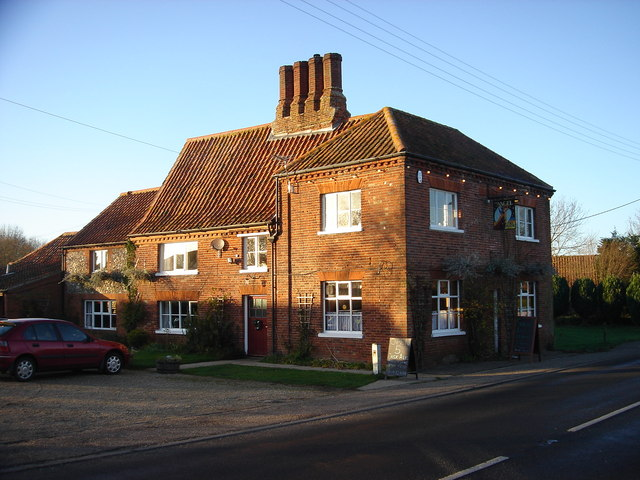
The home of Richard Lincoln, grandfather of Samuel Lincoln, Swanton Morley, Norfolk, England. Today a village pub.

== See also ==
- Lincoln family

== Sources ==
- Waldo Lincoln, History of the Lincoln Family: An Account of the Descendants of Samuel Lincoln of Hingham, Massachusetts, 1637–1920 (1923) ISBN 0-7884-1489-5.
- Lincoln's Youth: Indiana Years, Seven to Twenty-One, 1816–1830, Indiana University Press (2002) ISBN 0-87195-063-4.
- Genealogy of Samuel Lincoln.
- LINCOLN (Samuel), from George Lincoln, The History of the Town of Hingham, Massachusetts, The Genealogies (1893).
- English church reaches out to Lincoln land; Building where president's ancestors once worshipped in need of major repairs.
- The Ancestry of Abraham Lincoln, James Henry Lea, John Robert Hutchinson, Houghton Mifflin Company, Boston, 1909
