= Long Run Baptist Church and Cemetery =

Historic church and cemetery in Jefferson County, Kentucky

- U.S. National Register of Historic Places
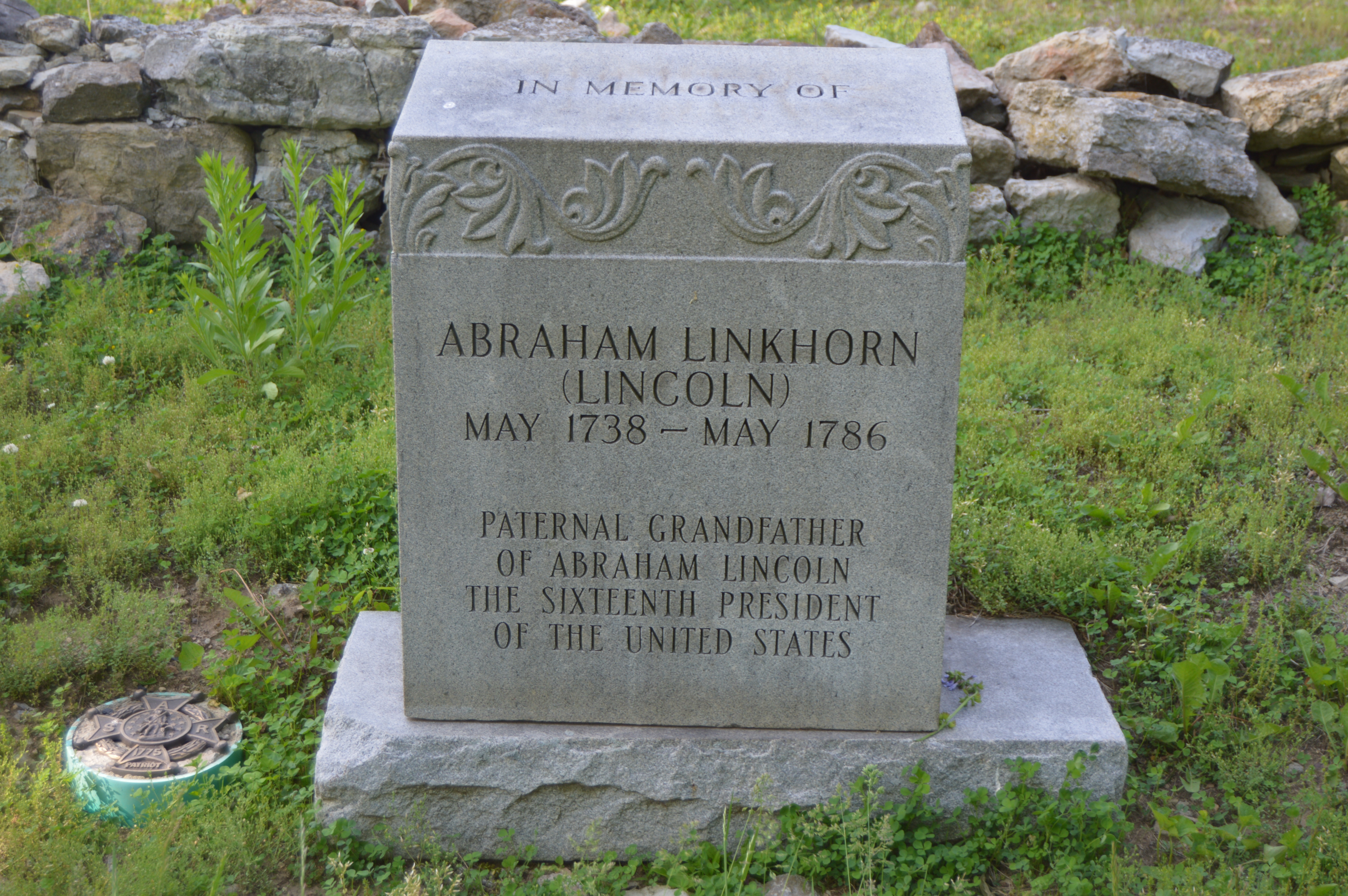
- Modern grave marker for Abraham Lincoln

- Location within Kentucky Location within the United States
- Location: Long Run Road in Eastwood, Louisville, Jefferson County, Kentucky
- Coordinates: 38°15′17″N 85°24′48″W
- Area: 1 acre (0.40 ha)
- Built: 1844
- NRHP reference No.: 75000768
- Added to NRHP: August 06, 1975

Long Run Baptist Church and Cemetery (also known as the Lincoln Cabin Site) is a historic church and cemetery on Long Run Road in Eastwood neighborhood of Louisville, Kentucky.

In 1786 Captain Abraham Lincoln, grandfather of President Abraham Lincoln was murdered near this site by Native Americans, while President Lincoln's father, Thomas Lincoln, age eight, watched his father's murder. Tradition states that Captain Abraham Lincoln was buried by his cabin, which is now the site of Long Run Baptist Church and Cemetery. A stone memorializing Captain Abraham Lincoln was placed in the cemetery in 1937. The church was built on the site in 1844. The church and cemetery were added to the National Register of Historic Places in 1975.
