= Webster, Illinois =

Webster, Illinois may refer to:

- Webster, Hancock County, Illinois
- Webster, Iroquois County, Illinois
