= Abraham Lincoln (captain) =

Grandfather of president Abraham Lincoln (1744–1786)

- Born: May 13, 1744; Berks County, Pennsylvania, British America
- Died: May 1786 (aged 42); Jefferson County, Virginia, U.S. (now Jefferson County, Kentucky, U.S.)
- Cause of death: Murdered (gunshot wound)
- Resting place: Long Run Baptist Church Cemetery, Eastwood, Kentucky, U.S. 38.254754°N 85.413315°W
- Occupations: Tanner, farmer
- Known for: Grandfather and namesake of Abraham Lincoln
- Title: Captain
- Children: Mordecai Lincoln; Josiah Lincoln; Mary Lincoln; Thomas Lincoln; Nancy Lincoln
- Parent(s): John Lincoln; Rebekah Flowers
- Relatives: Abraham Lincoln (grandson)

Signature
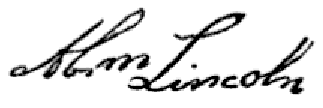

Captain Abraham Lincoln (May 13, 1744 – May 1786) was the paternal grandfather and namesake of the 16th U.S. president, Abraham Lincoln. Lincoln was a military captain during the American Revolution, and a pioneer settler of Kentucky. Some historical sources attest his last name as Linkhorn, although neither Abraham nor his children ever signed themselves as such.

== Origins ==
Abraham Lincoln was a descendant of Samuel Lincoln (1622–1690), who was born in Hingham, Norfolk, England, and who, as a weaver's apprentice, emigrated to Massachusetts Bay Colony in 1637. Abraham's father John Lincoln (1716–1788) was born in Monmouth County in the province of New Jersey, and grew up in the Schuylkill river valley in the province of Pennsylvania. Typical of his class, John Lincoln learned a trade, in his case weaving, to practice alongside the subsistence farming necessary on the colonial frontier. The Lincoln home farm on Hiester's Creek, in what is now Exeter Township, Berks County, was left to John's half-brothers, the children of his father's second marriage. In 1743, John Lincoln married Rebekah Morris (1720–1806), daughter of Enoch Flowers of Caernarvon Township, Lancaster County, Pennsylvania. Rebekah was the widow of James Morris and the mother of a young son, Jonathan Morris.

== Early life and education ==
Lincoln was born May 13, 1744, in what is now Berks County, Pennsylvania. He was the first child born to John and Rebekah Lincoln, who had nine children in all: Abraham born 1744, twins Hannah and Lydia born 1748, Isaac born 1750, Jacob born 1751, John born 1755, Sarah born 1757, Thomas born 1761, and Rebekah born 1767.

== Life ==
Lincoln learned the tanner's trade and later took his brother John as his apprentice. A prominent tanner of Berks County in those days was James Boone (1709 – 1785), uncle to Daniel Boone. James Boone was a near neighbor to the Lincolns of Hiester's Creek, and his daughter Anne was married to John Lincoln's half-brother. This family connection may have influenced Abraham's choice of occupation.

In 1768, his father John Lincoln purchased land in the Shenandoah Valley in the colony of Virginia. He settled his family on a 600-acre (2.4 km^{2}) tract on Linville Creek in Augusta County (now Rockingham County). In 1773, John and Rebekah Lincoln divided their tract with their two eldest sons, Abraham and Isaac. Lincoln built a house on his land, across Linville Creek from his parents' home.

Lincoln married Bathsheba Herring (c. 1742 – 1836), a daughter of Alexander Herring (c. 1708 – c. 1778) and his wife Abigail Harrison (c. 1710 – c. 1780) of Linville Creek. The assertion that Lincoln was first married to Mary Shipley has been refuted. Five children were born to Lincoln: Mordecai born circa 1771, Josiah born circa 1773, Mary born circa 1775, Thomas born 1778, and Nancy born 1780.

During the American Revolutionary War, Lincoln served as a captain of the Augusta County militia, and with the organization of Rockingham County in 1778, he served as a captain for that county. He was in command of sixty of his neighbors, ready to be called out by the governor of Virginia and marched where needed. Captain Lincoln's company served under General Lachlan McIntosh in the fall and winter of 1778, assisting in the construction of Fort McIntosh in Pennsylvania and Fort Laurens in Ohio.

In 1780, Lincoln sold his land on Mill Creek, and in 1781 he moved his family to Kentucky, then a district of the Commonwealth of Virginia. The family settled in Jefferson County, about twenty miles (32 km) east of the site of Louisville. The territory was still contested by Native Americans living across the Ohio River. For protection the settlers lived near frontier forts, called stations, to which they retreated when the alarm was given. Lincoln settled near Hughes' Station on Floyd's Fork and began clearing land, planting corn, and building a cabin. Lincoln owned at least 5,544 acres of land in the richest sections of Kentucky.

== Death ==
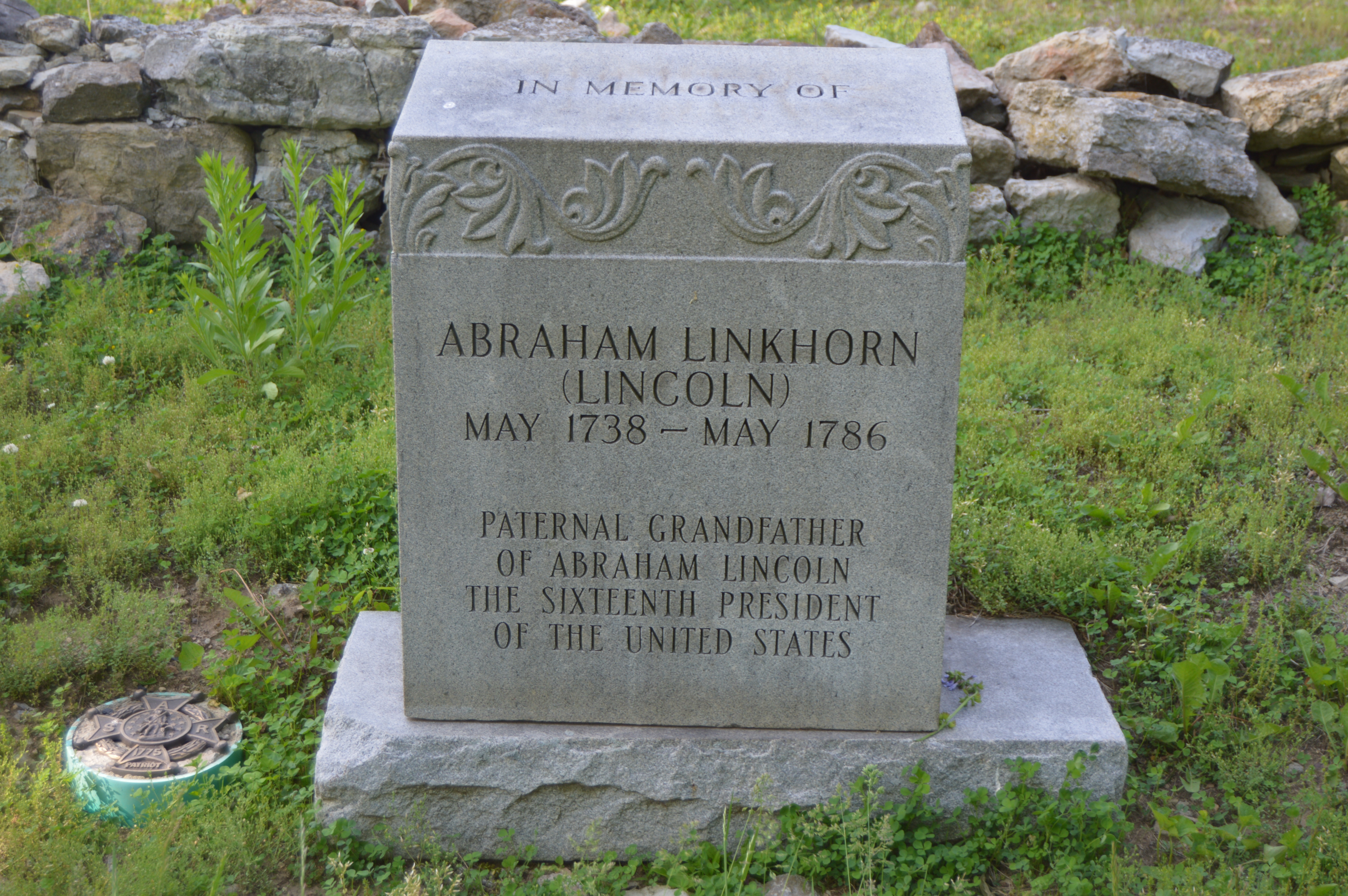
Modern grave marker at the traditional site of Lincoln's cabin

One day in May 1786, Lincoln was working in his field with his three sons when he was shot from the nearby forest and fell to the ground. The eldest boy, Mordecai, ran to the cabin where a loaded gun was kept, while the middle son, Josiah, ran to Hughes' Station for help. Thomas, the youngest, stood in shock by his father. From the cabin, Mordecai observed a Native American come out of the forest and stop by his father's body. The Native American reached for Thomas, either to kill him or to carry him off. Mordecai took aim and shot the Native American in the chest, killing him.

Tradition states that Lincoln was buried next to his cabin, which is now the site of Long Run Baptist Church and Cemetery near Eastwood, Kentucky. A stone memorializing Lincoln was placed in the cemetery in 1937.

Bathsheba Lincoln was left a widow with five underage children. She moved the family away from the Ohio River, to Washington County, where the country was more thickly settled and there was less danger of a Native American attack. Under the law then operating, Mordecai Lincoln, as the eldest son, inherited two-thirds of his father's estate when he reached the age of twenty-one, with Bathsheba receiving one-third. The other children inherited nothing. Life was hard, particularly for Thomas, the youngest, who got little schooling and was forced to go to work at a young age.

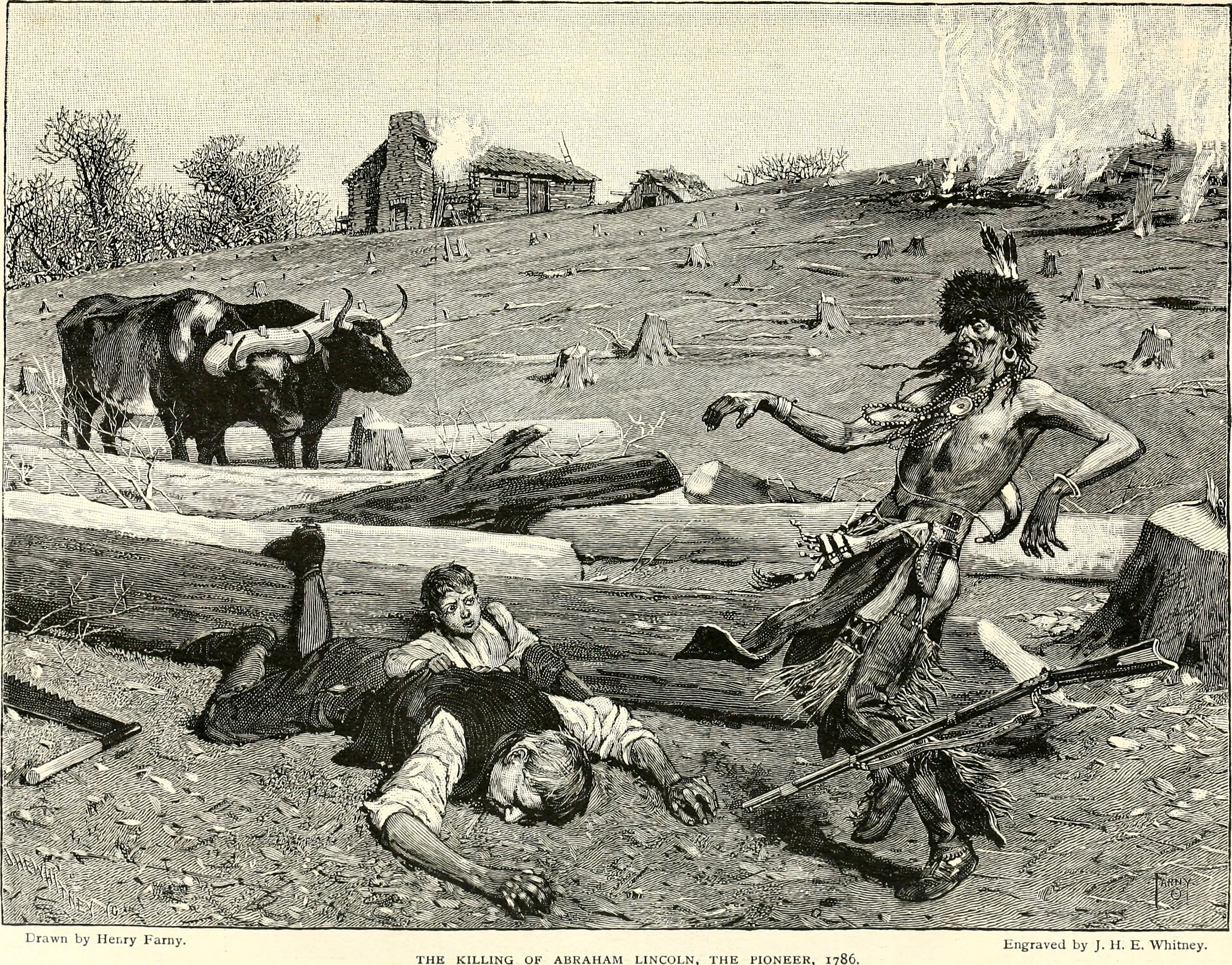
Depiction in 1887 book of the death of Captain Lincoln

In later years Thomas Lincoln would recount the story of the day his father died, to his son, Abraham Lincoln, the future sixteenth president of the United States of America. "The story of his death by the Indians," the president later wrote, "and of Uncle Mordecai, then fourteen years old, killing one of the Indians, is the legend more strongly than all others imprinted on my mind and memory."

== See also ==
- Lincoln family tree
