= Fountain Green =

Fountain Green can refer to:

- Fountain Green, Illinois
- Fountain Green, Utah
