= Fountain Green Township, Hancock County, Illinois =

Fountain Green Township
- Township
- Township building in Fountain Green

- Location in Hancock County

- Hancock County's location in Illinois
- Coordinates: 40°30′19″N 90°58′26″W
- Country: United States
- State: Illinois
- County: Hancock
- Established: November 6, 1849

Area
  - Total: 37.53 sq mi (97.2 km^{2})
  - Land: 37.52 sq mi (97.2 km^{2})
  - Water: 0.01 sq mi (0.026 km^{2}) 0.01%
- Elevation: 627 ft (191 m)

Population (2020)
  - Total: 218
  - Density: 5.81/sq mi (2.24/km^{2})
- Time zone: UTC-6 (CST)
  - Summer (DST): UTC-5 (CDT)
- ZIP codes: 61420, 61450, 62318, 62321
- FIPS code: 17-067-27325

Fountain Green Township is one of twenty-four townships in Hancock County, Illinois, USA. As of the 2020 census, its population was 218 and it contained 145 housing units.

== Geography ==
According to the 2021 census gazetteer files, Fountain Green Township has a total area of 37.53 square miles (97.20 km^{2}), of which 37.52 square miles (97.18 km^{2}) (or 99.99%) is land and 0.01 square miles (0.03 km^{2}) (or 0.01%) is water.

=== Unincorporated towns ===
- Fountain Green at 40.475876°N 90.969304°W
- La Crosse at 40.528931°N 91.022918°W
- Webster at 40.466432°N 91.000694°W

(This list is based on USGS data and may include former settlements.)

=== Cemeteries ===
The township contains these four cemeteries: Fountain Green, Lincoln Catholic, McConnell and Wright.

== Demographics ==
Historical population
Census	Pop.	Note	%±
1860	1,410		—
1870	1,475		4.6%
1880	1,258		−14.7%
1890	1,095		−13.0%
1900	1,038		−5.2%
1910	985		−5.1%
1920	857		−13.0%
1930	754		−12.0%
1940	774		2.7%
1950	666		−14.0%
1960	508		−23.7%
1970	444		−12.6%
1980	414		−6.8%
1990	381		−8.0%
2000	329		−13.6%
2010	288		−12.5%
2020	218		−24.3%
U.S. Decennial Census

As of the 2020 census there were 218 people, 96 households, and 96 families residing in the township. The population density was 5.81 inhabitants per square mile (2.24/km^{2}). There were 119 housing units at an average density of 3.17 per square mile (1.22/km^{2}). The racial makeup of the township was 97.25% White, 0.00% African American, 0.00% Native American, 0.00% Asian, 0.00% Pacific Islander, 0.00% from other races, and 2.75% from two or more races. Hispanic or Latino of any race were 0.46% of the population.

There were 96 households, out of which 27.10% had children under the age of 18 living with them, 88.54% were married couples living together, 11.46% had a female householder with no spouse present, and 0.00% were non-families. No households were made up of individuals. The average household size was 2.54 and the average family size was 2.42.

The township's age distribution consisted of 19.7% under the age of 18, 6.1% from 18 to 24, 16.8% from 25 to 44, 24.2% from 45 to 64, and 33.2% who were 65 years of age or older. The median age was 54.1 years. For every 100 females, there were 100.0 males. For every 100 females age 18 and over, there were 106.3 males.

The median income for a household in the township was $76,000, and the median income for a family was $55,833. Males had a median income of $43,021 versus $24,773 for females. The per capita income for the township was $25,744. About 21.9% of families and 16.0% of the population were below the poverty line, including none of those under age 18 and 48.1% of those age 65 or over.

== School districts ==
- West Prairie Community Unit School District 103

== Political districts ==
- Illinois's 18th congressional district
- State House District 94
- State Senate District 47
