= Mordecai Lincoln =

Uncle of Abraham Lincoln (1771 – 1830)

- Born: 1771; Augusta County, Virginia, now Rockingham County, Virginia
- Died: 1830 (aged 59); Hancock County, Illinois
- Occupation: Farmer
- Spouse(s): Mary Mudd (1792–1830; his death)
- Children: 6
- Parent(s): Abraham Lincoln; Bathsheba Herring
- Relatives: Josiah Lincoln (brother); Mary Lincoln Crume (sister); Nancy Lincoln Brumfield (sister); Thomas Lincoln (brother); Abraham Lincoln (nephew)

Mordecai Lincoln (1771 – 1830) was an uncle of U.S. President Abraham Lincoln. He was the eldest son of Captain Abraham Lincoln, a brother of Thomas Lincoln and Mary Lincoln Crume, and the husband of Mary Mudd. He is buried at the Old Catholic or Lincoln Cemetery near Fountain Green, Illinois.

Mordecai's home in Springfield, Kentucky, is the only home built by a member of the Lincoln family that still stands in its original location. It is listed on the National Register of Historic Places.

== Early life ==
Mordecai was the first child of Abraham Lincoln (1744–1786) and Bathsheba Herring (c. 1742–1836); he was born in 1771 in Augusta County (now Rockingham County, Virginia). Abraham had been given 210 acres of prime Virginian land from his father, John Lincoln, and later sold the land to move in 1782 to western Virginia (now Kentucky). He amassed an estate of 5,544 acres of prime Kentucky land, realizing the bounty as advised by Daniel Boone, a relative of the Lincoln family. The couple had five children: Mordecai, Josiah, Thomas, Ann (Nancy), and Mary.

The family settled in Jefferson County, about twenty miles (32 km) east of the site of Louisville. The territory was still contested by Native Americans living across the Ohio River. For protection the settlers lived near frontier forts, called stations, to which they retreated when the alarm was given. Abraham Lincoln settled near Hughes' Station on Floyd's Fork and began clearing land, planting corn, and building a cabin.

One day in May 1786, Abraham Lincoln was working in his field with his three sons when he was shot from the nearby forest and fell to the ground. The eldest boy, Mordecai, ran to the cabin for the loaded gun, while the middle son, Josiah, ran to Hughes' Station for help. Thomas, the youngest, stood in shock by his father. From the cabin, Mordecai saw an American Indian come out of the forest and stop by his father's body. The Native American reached for Thomas. Mordecai took aim and shot the Native American in the chest, killing him and saving Thomas from the presumably ill-intentioned Native American. After witnessing the killing of his father, Mordecai maintained a hatred and "avenging spirit" towards Native Americans.

Soon afterward, his mother moved the family to Washington County, Kentucky (near Springfield). After Mordecai's father died, Mordecai as the eldest son inherited his father's land and property, according to the system of primogeniture. Left without a patrimony like many younger sons, Josiah and Thomas had to make their own way in the world.

A replica of the home where Bathsheba raised the five children was erected in 1934 in the Lincoln Homestead State Park.

== Adulthood ==
In 1792 he married Mary Mudd, daughter of Luke Mudd. (Note: Mary Mudd was a first cousin twice removed of Dr. Samuel A. Mudd, tried as a co-conspirator of the assassination of Abraham Lincoln.) In January 1797 Mordecai sold his inherited property in Jefferson County that had been purchased by his father in 1780. He sold the 400 acres for £400. Four months later, he purchased 300 acres in Springfield, Kentucky for £100 from Terah Templin. Templin was Kentucky's first ordained Presbyterian minister. The two-storied cabin, called the Lincoln Homestead was built when Mordecai was 26 years of age. Between 1810 and 1815 the two-story cabin was enlarged and faced with a Federal-style frame by Wilfred Hayden, the second owner of the home. The actual, enlarged and renovated Mordecai Lincoln Homestead is located on its original site, the only Lincoln family home believed to be on its original location.

The couple had six children. Three sons were named Abraham, James and Mordecai. All of their children were born in Washington County, Kentucky.

Mordecai lived near his friend Richard Berry, the home where his brother Thomas Lincoln and Nancy Hanks were married in 1806. In 1802 Mordecai sold 200 of the 300 acres and the home; In 1806 he sold the final 100 acres. (Note: The National Register of Historic Places nomination form for the Mordecai Lincoln House in Springfield, Kentucky states contradictory information about Mordecai living next to the Berrys when his brother was married in 1806. The NRHP form states that Mordecai sold his house and 200 of his 300 acres in 1802 (5 years after the purchase) and removed to the 130 acre homestead farm. It does say that although he paid taxes for the homestead farm for 18 years, he never received the title for the property from General Matthew Walton.) Mordecai bred racehorses.

Lincoln owned more than 400 acres by 1810. Mordecai and his family moved to Grayson County, Kentucky from Washington County in 1811. In the spring of 1828 he moved from his Grayson County home to Fountain Park (Fountain Green, Illinois), Hancock County, Illinois with other families of the Catholic faith; Four of the couple's six children moved with them. (Note: Alternately, they may have moved to Illinois in 1829.) Mordecai was "overtaken" and died during a three-day blizzard in December 1830 in Fountain Green. Although his horse returned during the storm, he was captured in the snow that drifted up to 20 feet and his body was not recovered until the snow melted in April. Following Mordecai's death, Mary lived with her unmarried son Mordecai at the time of her death. (Note: This is some confusion about whether Mordecai was visiting Illinois or came to live in Illinois. Based upon a letter from Abraham Lincoln about his uncle, Mordecai moved to Illinois in 1829 and died there the following year.)

Mordecai was known for his intellect, generosity, and story telling.

== Relationship with Abraham Lincoln ==
In regards to Mordecai's wit and abilities, on several occasions, President Lincoln referred to his uncle as his most important familial influence, and once remarked that "Uncle Mord had run off with all the talents of the family." (Note: According to letter Lincoln wrote about his uncle, he did not live near his uncle, but often saw him. His uncle and the uncle's children moved from Kentucky to Hancock County, Illinois, where he died by 1832.)

Like Abraham Lincoln, his uncle's family was also subject to depression, called "the Lincoln horrors." Aside from sharing the tendency to melancholy, Mordecai and his sons also appeared to share a sense of humor as well as a physical resemblance with Abraham Lincoln.

== See also ==
- Mordecai Lincoln House (Springfield, Kentucky)
- Lincoln family tree
