= Mary Lincoln Crume =

Aunt of Abraham Lincoln

- Born: Mary Lincoln; 1775; Augusta County, Virginia, now Rockingham County, Virginia
- Died: c. 1832 (aged 57); Breckinridge County, Kentucky
- Spouses: Daniel Edgar Crume; Ralph Crume, Jr.
- Children: 5
- Parent(s): Abraham Lincoln (captain); Bathsheba Herring
- Relatives: Josiah Lincoln (brother); Mordecai Lincoln (brother); Nancy Lincoln Brumfield (sister); Thomas Lincoln (brother)

Mary Lincoln Crume (1775 – c. 1832) was born in Linville Creek, Rockingham County, Virginia and is buried in the cemetery at Crume Valley, Breckinridge County, Kentucky. She was the aunt of the 16th President of the United States Abraham Lincoln. Abraham Lincoln highlighted his aunt in an autobiographical sketch written for his political campaign.

== President Abraham Lincoln's Mary Todd Lincoln ==
President Abraham Lincoln considered his family connections to be significant for his presidential campaign. In June 1860, he wrote a short autobiography to be used in his bid for the White House. In this sketch, he highlighted his ancestry and extended relatives including Mary Lincoln, the eldest of his father's sisters. He also indicated that some of her descendants were known to be in Breckinridge County, Kentucky. While he was president, he mentions his Uncle Ralph and Aunt Mary again in a letter to a cousin, Susana Weathers, thanking her for a pair of socks. The President's father, Thomas, had dealings with his sister, Mary, for many years. He built her a corner cabinet for her dishes which now resides in the Brown-Pusey House Museum in Elizabethtown, Kentucky. Thomas sought help from his sister and brother-in-law on one or possibly two of his moves to Indiana, the initial move and the second move of his second wife to Indiana. This second move may have given Ralph the idea to move to Indiana which he did for a short period in 1829–30.

== Early life and family ==
Mary Lincoln Crume was the third child of Captain Abraham Lincoln (May 13, 1744 – May 1786) and his wife, Bathsheba Herring Lincoln (c. 1742 – 1836), a daughter of Alexander Herring (c. 1708 – 1778) and his wife Abigail Harrison Herring (c. 1710 – c. 1780) of Linville Creek. Five children were born to Abraham and Bathsheba Lincoln: Mordecai born circa 1771, Josiah born circa 1773, Mary born circa 1775, Thomas born 1778, and Nancy born 1780.

Mary was born at the Lincoln Homestead, Linville Creek, in then Augusta County, Virginia (now Rockingham County, Virginia). At age 6, her parents sold their land and the family moved to Jefferson County, Kentucky.

== Marriages and children ==
Mary Lincoln Crume was the probable second wife of Daniel Crume (January 27, 1758 – September 16, 1824), forming a common-law or frontier marriage about 1791 and dissolving it before 1801. There are no public records on this relationship. They had two daughters: Sarah Crume Hasty (25 January 1792 – 7 July 1879) and Elizabeth W. Crume Davis (1794 – 2 August 1880). The Brookville Star, 17 December 1917, indicates that Elizabeth W. Crume was a first cousin of Abraham Lincoln.

Mary's marriage to Ralph Crume Jr., the nephew of Daniel Crume, occurred on 5 August 1801. She is buried in the cemetery at Crume Valley in Breckinridge County, Kentucky.

== See also ==
- Lincoln family tree
