= Mordecai Lincoln House (Springfield, Kentucky) =

Historic house in Kentucky, United States

- U.S. National Register of Historic Places
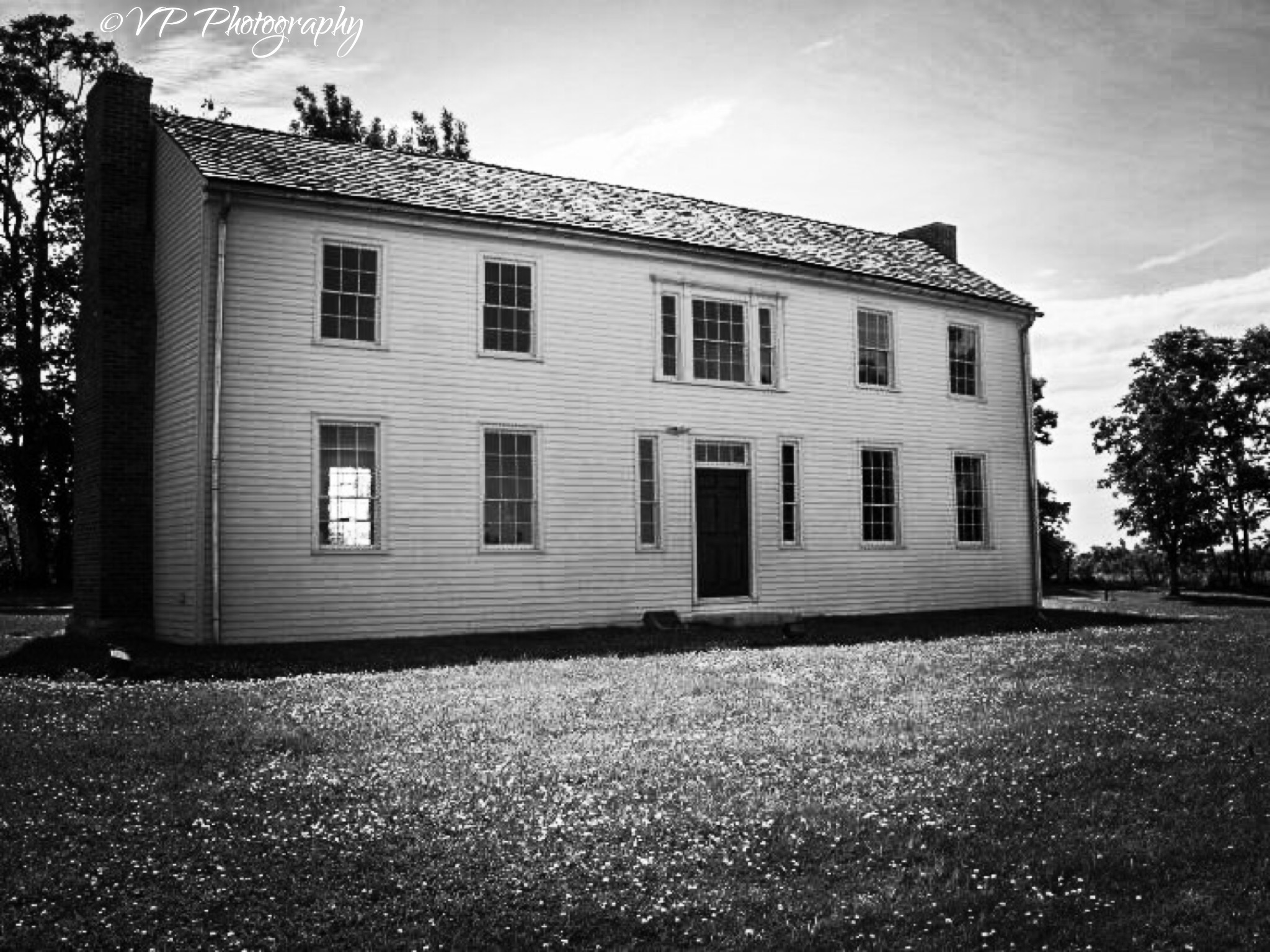

- Location within Kentucky Location within the United States
- Nearest city: Springfield, Kentucky
- Coordinates: 37°44′54″N 85°12′35″W
- Built: 1797
- Architectural style: Federal
- NRHP reference No.: 72000547
- Added to NRHP: August 21, 1972

The Mordecai Lincoln House is a historic house located in Washington County, Kentucky, 6 miles (9.7 km) north of Springfield, Kentucky. It was the home of Mordecai Lincoln, brother of Thomas Lincoln, the father of the 16th President of the United States Abraham Lincoln. It is the only house owned by a member of Abraham Lincoln's family that still stands in Kentucky. It is across KY 528 from Lincoln Homestead State Park.

== History ==
Mordecai Lincoln was with his father Captain Abraham Lincoln when he was shot by an Indian. Mordecai rescued his younger brother Thomas, by shooting an Indian reaching for him. Thomas became the father of Abraham Lincoln, the future president.

In 1792 Mordecai gained his inheritance from his father upon reaching the age of majority. Later the same year he married into one of the "first families" of Washington County by marrying Mary Mudd. (Mary's first cousin twice removed was Doctor Samuel Mudd, who was guilty of conspiring in the Lincoln assassination; he treated John Wilkes Booth's broken leg during Booth's escape attempt after the assassination of Abraham Lincoln in April 1865).

In 1797 Mordecai Lincoln bought 300 acres (1.2 km^{2}) from Terah Templin in Washington County, and built what is known as the Mordecai Lincoln House on the property. He and his family lived in the house until 1811, when they moved to Grayson County, Kentucky. In 1828 they moved to Hancock County, Illinois, where Mordecai died two years later.

The Mordecai Lincoln House is the only home of any member of the Lincoln family that still stands in Kentucky. The homes of Abraham Lincoln's father Thomas Lincoln, Sinking Spring Farm and Knob Creek Farm, were both razed in the 19th century, as was Mordecai's Grayson County home. His brother Josiah Lincoln's log cabin was destroyed in 1941.

== See also ==
- Mordecai Lincoln House (Lorane, Pennsylvania)

== Bibliography ==
- Kelly, E. O. (June 1972). Mordecai Lincoln House NRHP Nomination Form. Kentucky Heritage Commission.
