= Fountain Green, Illinois =

Fountain Green
- Unincorporated community
- Location of Fountain Green within Illinois Fountain Green (the United States)
- Coordinates: 40°28′33″N 90°58′09″W
- Country: United States
- State: Illinois
- County: Hancock
- District: Fountain Green
- Time zone: UTC-6 (CST)
  - Summer (DST): UTC-5 (CDT)

Fountain Green is an unincorporated community located about eleven miles northeast of Carthage, Illinois, United States in Fountain Green Township, Hancock County, Illinois.

== History ==
One of the earliest settlers in this area was Mordecai Lincoln, who prior to 1830 led a group from Kentucky in an attempt to establish a Catholic settlement in this part of Illinois, presaging by several years the Mormon settlement in nearby Nauvoo. He was followed by other southerners who were mostly Baptist in faith, including Baptists who had lived close to Mordecai near Springfield, Kentucky. Some of the Baptists settled along Baptist Creek to the northeast of Fountain Green.

The Catholic settlement foundered, in part because of the difficulty in obtaining a parish priest. The Baptist theology was better able to cope with such problems on the frontier.

In the 1850s coal was discovered, and railroads were extended into the area. With the railroads came coal miners from Pennsylvania. The coal miners were mainly descendants of Northern Irish Protestants who had fled the Irish Rebellion of 1798. An Irish Protestant church (Calvinist) was soon established in Fountain Green, attracting members from the earlier groups. This seems to have been a local manifestation of the general movement in the North away from the Baptist church, which, in the 1850s, supported slavery.

By 1880, Irish Catholics began settling in the area to work the mines, establishing new Catholic churches and cemeteries in nearby communities, with no apparent recognition of the earlier settlement, which seems to have been forgotten.

The original Catholic settlers are buried in the Old Catholic or Lincoln Cemetery near Fountain Green.
