= Webster, Hancock County, Illinois =

Webster, Illinois
- Unincorporated community
- Location of Webster within Illinois Webster, Illinois (the United States)
- Coordinates: 40°27′59″N 91°00′02″W
- Country: United States
- State: Illinois
- County: Hancock County
- Township: Fountain Green
- Elevation: 623 ft (190 m)
- Time zone: UTC-6 (CST)
  - Summer (DST): UTC-5 (CDT)
- Postal code: 62321
- Area code: 217

Webster is an unincorporated community in Fountain Green Township, Hancock County, Illinois, United States. It was originally known as Ramus and was settled under the direction of Joel H. Johnson.

The settlement here was largely due to the presence of Ute and Sarah Perkins who had moved to the area in 1826. This area became known as Perkins Settlement. A short time later a group of Catholic families moved from Kentucky, led by Mordecai Lincoln. In 1838 Lincoln established the Catholic Church of St. Simon the Apostle in the area, which was supervised by the diocese of St. Louis.

The Perkins family joined the Church of Jesus Christ of Latter-day Saints in 1839, responding to the teaching of Joel H. Johnson. The Perkins became the center of the community. The Perkinses were so central to the community that at times it was called Perkins Settlement.

Johnson moved to the area in February 1840. In July 1840 a stake of the Church of Jesus Christ of Latter-day Saints was organized giving the place the name of Ramus. Some of the Perkins land was purchased, and set out into a town of 24 blocks. Johnson set about promoting the town to Mormons elsewhere as a worthwhile place with plenty of surrounding agricultural land and a growing settlement. In 1841 nine blocks were added to the town.

In about 1841, the Latter Day Saints built a meetinghouse in Ramus, which may have been the first meetinghouse built by Latter Day Saints. Other sources call this building a schoolhouse. Another notable early resident of Ramus was Benjamin F. Johnson who operated a store there.

By the end of 1842 there were between 500 and 600 people in Ramus.

In 1843 the town was renamed Macedonia when it was formally incorporated by the Illinois legislature. By 1845 the population had declined to 380.

Doctrine and Covenants sections 130 and 131 are gathered from remarks given by Joseph Smith at Ramus.

Today the Webster Community Church, built in 1897, occupies the site of this early Latter Day Saint meetinghouse.
