= Mordecai Lincoln House (Lorane, Pennsylvania) =

Historic house in Pennsylvania, United States

- U.S. National Register of Historic Places
- Pennsylvania state historical marker
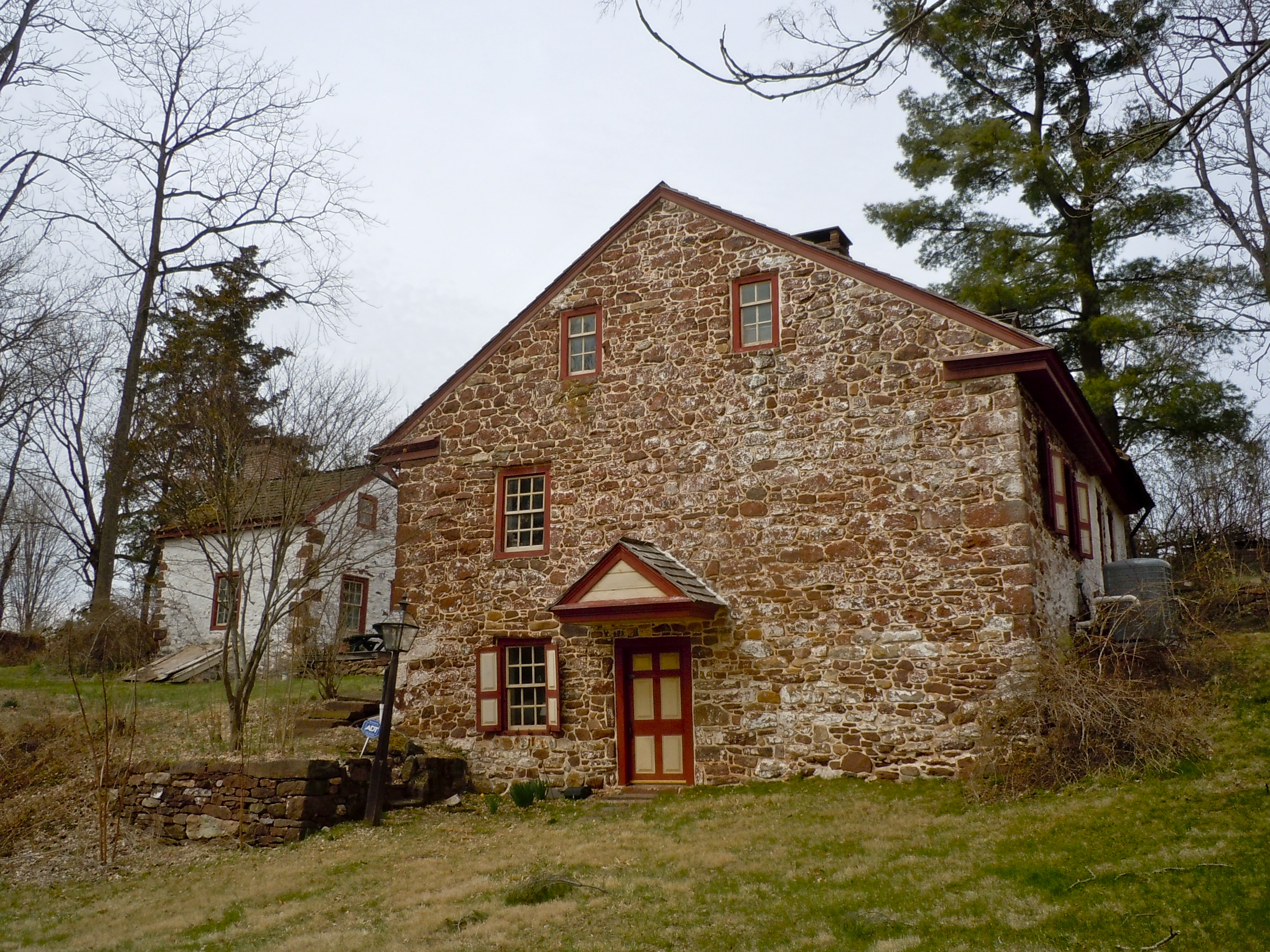
- View from the road (east)

- Location within Pennsylvania Location within the United States
- Nearest city: Birdsboro, Pennsylvania
- Coordinates: 40°16′55″N 75°50′2″W
- Built: 1733, 1760
- Architectural style: Vernacular
- NRHP reference No.: 88002370

Significant dates
- Added to NRHP: November 3, 1988
- Designated PHMC: March 29, 1947

The Mordecai Lincoln House is a historic house in Exeter Township, Berks County, Pennsylvania built c. 1733 by Mordecai Lincoln, the great-great-grandfather of President Abraham Lincoln. The house stands in the narrow valley of Hiester Creek on a 9-acre plot near the village of Lorane on Lincoln Road.

== History ==
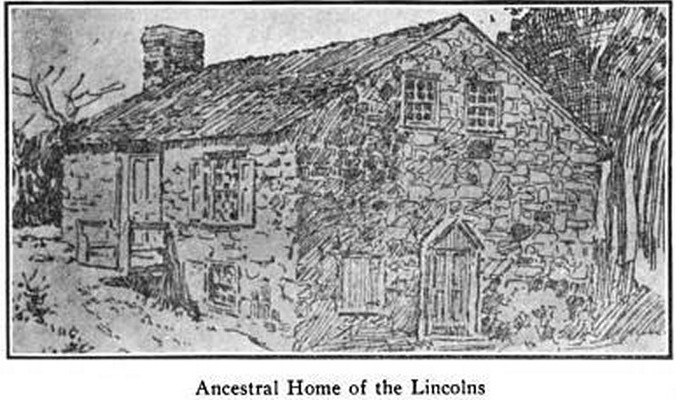
Sketch of the house published in 1907 from an earlier drawing. The sketch likely shows the state of the building before 1760.

President Lincoln had only a vague knowledge of his Pennsylvania ancestors, believing that they were Quakers from Berks County. The first Mordecai Lincoln lived in Scituate, Massachusetts. Two of his sons, Abraham and Mordecai Jr., the president's great-great-grandfather, first moved to New Jersey before 1714 and then to Pennsylvania in 1720. Mordecai Jr. settled near the present day Coventryville, Chester County and became a partner in the Coventry Forge with Samuel Nutt Sr. and William Bransom, then selling that interest for five hundred pounds in 1726. He moved to Amity Township, Philadelphia County (now Exeter Township, Berks County) sometime after 1727. In 1729 Mordecai Jr. leased a thousand-acre farm and married his second wife, Mary Robeson. He later bought the farm and built his house on it about 1733. The house was enlarged about 1760 and a separate summer kitchen was built in the early nineteenth century.

The Mordecai Lincoln House is four miles south of the Daniel Boone Homestead, birthplace of famous frontiersman Daniel Boone, and the two families clearly were acquainted. Mordecai Lincoln Jr. served as a justice of the peace, road inspector, and militia captain or commissioner for defense against the Indians. He died in 1736, shortly before the birth of a son, also named Abraham. This Abraham married the first cousin of Daniel Boone, Anne Boone, who was a Quaker but who was censured by the Exeter Friends Meeting for marrying a non-Quaker. This fact indicates that the Lincolns were not Quakers, even though Mordecai Jr. is believed to be buried in the Exeter Friends Burial Ground. In his will, Mordecai Jr. left land in New Jersey to his sons by his first wife. His land in Pennsylvania was left to his sons by his second wife, with his son Mordecai inheriting the house.

John Lincoln, the eldest son of Mordecai Jr., was great-grandfather of President Lincoln. He was born in 1716 in New Jersey and owned several pieces of land in Lancaster and Berks counties. He lived at least 35 years in Pennsylvania, including 8 years in Amity Township. In 1765 he sold his Pennsylvania land before moving to the Shenandoah Valley in Virginia. Several of his descendants were also named Mordecai or Abraham.

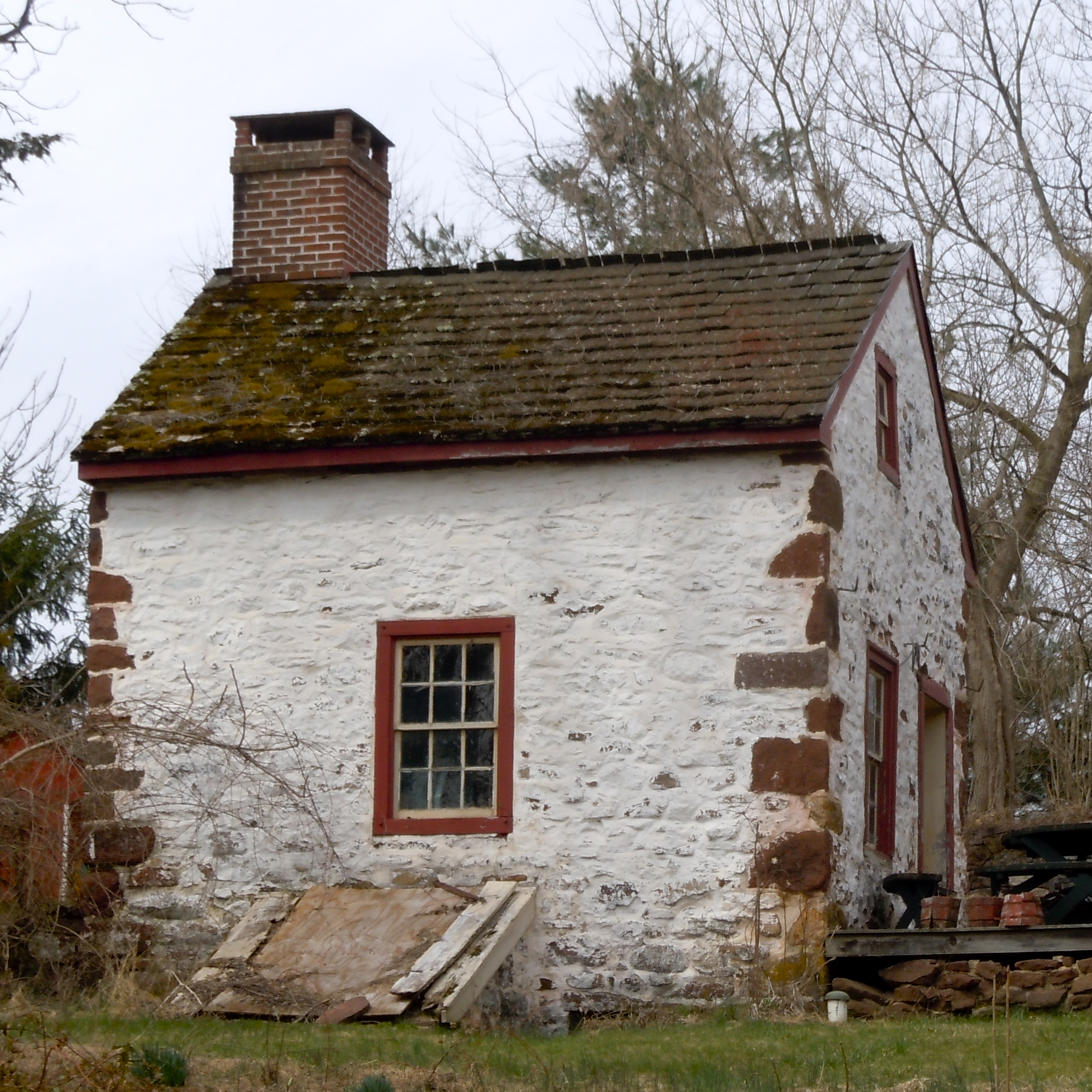
Summer kitchen

== Architecture ==
The 1733 section of the house, with its gable facing the road, is banked into the hill with two stories rising above the basement level. Viewed from the road, It is about 30 feet wide by 20 feet deep, with two rooms, one on each side. It is one of the oldest English-style houses in Berks County, and resembles the Penn Plan design propagated by William Penn in the early days of Pennsylvania. Nevertheless, with the gable-end to the front and its banking into the hill, it also resembles the German vernacular style common in Berks County in the eighteenth century. The basement contains a walk-in fireplace about 7 feet wide.

The 1760 addition is stepped up the hill by about 11 inches and has a similar plan. It is about 30 feet wide and 36 feet deep. The walls of both sections are 18 inches thick and constructed of local stone. Dormers were added to the roof about 1830, and have been retained in the restoration that began in 1987. The summer kitchen, about 20 feet south of the 1760 addition, was built in the early nineteenth century. It is constructed of red sandstone, but is now painted white. It has 2 stories plus a large basement and includes another walk-in fireplace on its first floor.

The house was used as a farmhouse into the twentieth century. For about 20 years ending in 1987 it was abandoned and neglected, with a large hole in the roof opening up. A complete renovation in 1987-88 returned the house to its c. 1760 form.

== See also ==
- Mordecai Lincoln House (Springfield, Kentucky)
