= Bibliography of slavery in the United States =

Works relating to slavery in the United States

This bibliography of slavery in the United States is a guide to books documenting the history of slavery in the U.S., from its colonial origins in the 17th century through the adoption of the 13th Amendment to the Constitution, which officially abolished the practice in 1865. In addition, links are provided to related bibliographies, in the United States and articles elsewhere in Wikipedia.

== Histories ==
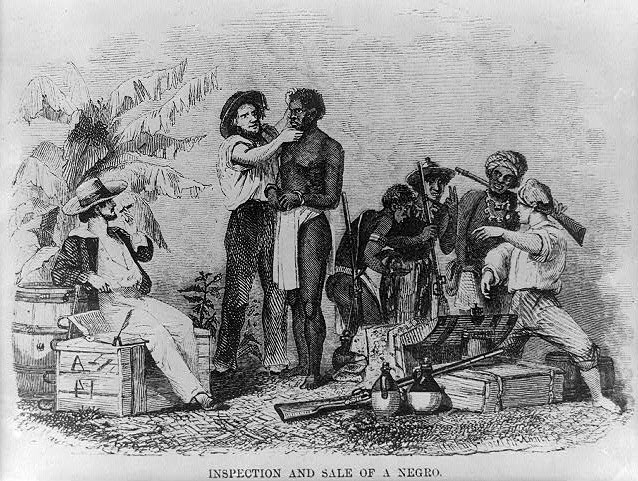
Inspection of an African man being sold into slavery.

- Bennett, Lerone Jr. (1966) [1962]. Before the Mayflower: A History of the Negro in America, 1619-1966. Chicago: Johnson Publishing Company, Inc.
- Berlin, Ira (1998). Many Thousands Gone: The First Two Centuries of Slavery in North America. Cambridge, MA: Belknap Press of Harvard University Press. ISBN 0-674-81092-9. Bancroft Prize for American History, 1999
- —— (2003). Generations of Captivity: A History of African-American Slaves. Cambridge, MA: Belknap Press of Harvard University Press. ISBN 0-674-01061-2.
- Brown, Richard D. (1976). Slavery in American Society. Lexington, MA: D.C. Heath and Company. ISBN 0669000736.
- Christian, Charles M.; Bennet, Sari (1998). Black Saga: The African American Experience, A Chronology. Boston: Houghton Mifflin Company. ISBN 0-395-68717-9.
- David, Paul A. (1976). Reckoning with Slavery: A Critical Study in the Quantitative History of American Negro Slavery. New York: Oxford University Press. ISBN 0-19-502034-0.
- Davis, David Brion (2006). Inhuman Bondage: The Rise and Fall of Slavery in the New World. New York: Oxford University Press. ISBN 978-0-19-514073-6.
- Drescher, Seymour (2009). Abolition: A History of Slavery and Antislavery. New York: Cambridge University Press. ISBN 9781139482967.
- Fischer, David Hackett (2022). African Founders: How Enslaved People Expanded American Ideals. New York: Simon and Schuster. ISBN 9781982145118.
- Fogel, Robert (1989). Without Consent or Contract: The Rise and Fall of American Slavery. New York: W.W. Norton & Company, Inc. ISBN 0-393-01887-3.
- Foner, Eric (2017) [2005]. Give Me Liberty!: An American History, Volume 1. New York: W.W. Norton & Company. ISBN 978-0-393-60339-2.
- —— (2017) [2005]. Give Me Liberty!: An American History, Volume 2. New York: W.W. Norton & Company. ISBN 978-0-393-28313-6.
- Genovese, Eugene D. (1974). Roll, Jordan, Roll: The World the Slaves Made. New York: Pantheon Books. Bancroft Prize for American History, 1975
- Johnson, Charles; Smith, Patricia (1999). Africans in America: America's Journey Through Slavery. New York: Houghton Mifflin Harcourt.
- Jones, Jacqueline; Wood, Peter H.; Borstelmann, Thomas; May, Elaine Tyler; Ruiz, Vicki L. (2017) [2011]. Created Equal: A History of the United States, Volume I: To 1877. Boston: Pearson Education, Inc. ISBN 978-0-13-410198-9.
- ——; ——; ——; ——; —— (2017) [2011]. Created Equal: A History of the United States, Volume II: Since 1865. Boston: Pearson Education, Inc. ISBN 978-0-13-410199-6.
- Kolchin, Peter (1987). Unfree Labor: American Slavery and Russian Serfdom. Cambridge, MA: Belknap Press of Harvard University Press. ISBN 0-674-92097-X. Bancroft Prize for American History, 1988
- Mann, Charles C. (2011). 1493: Uncovering the New World Columbus Created. New York: Alfred A. Knopf.
- Oakes, James (1983) [1982]. The Ruling Race: A History of American Slaveholders. New York: Vintage Books. ISBN 0-394-71639-6.
- Painter, Nell Irvin (2007). Creating Black Americans: African-American History and Its Meanings, 1619 to the Present. New York: Oxford University Press. ISBN 978-0-19-513756-9.
- —— (2010). The History of White People. New York: W.W. Norton & Company, Inc. ISBN 978-0-393-04934-3.
- Quarles, Benjamin (1996) [1964]. The Negro in the Making of America. New York: Simon & Schuster. ISBN 0-684-81888-4.
- Rodriguez, Junius P. (1999). Chronology of World Slavery. Santa Barbara, CA: ABC-CLIO, Inc. ISBN 0-87436-884-7.
- Schermerhorn, Calvin (2018). Unrequited Toil: A History of United States Slavery. New York: Cambridge University Press. ISBN 978-1-107-02766-4.
- Schneider, Dorothy; Schneider, Carl J. (2000). Slavery in America: From Colonial Times to the Civil War, An Eyewitness History. New York: Facts on File. ISBN 0-8160-3863-5.
- Smith, Clint (2021). How the Word Is Passed: A Reckoning with the History of Slavery across America. New York: Little, Brown and Company. ISBN 978-0316492935. National Book Critics Circle Award for Nonfiction, 2021
- Tannenbaum, Frank (1947) [1946]. Slave and Citizen: The Negro in Americas. New York: Alfred A. Knopf.
- Walker, James W. (1992) [1976]. The Black Loyalists: The Search for a Promised Land in Nova Scotia and Sierra Leone, 1783-1870. Toronto: University of Toronto Press. ISBN 0-8020-7402-2.
- Washington, Booker T. (1909). The Story of the Negro: The Rise of the Race from Slavery, Volume I. New York: Association Press (National Association for the Advancement of Colored People).
- —— (1909). The Story of the Negro: The Rise of the Race from Slavery, Volume II. New York: Association Press (National Association for the Advancement of Colored People).
- White, Deborah Gray; Bay, Mia; Martin, Waldo E. Jr., eds. (2013). Freedom on My Mind: A History of African Americans, Volume 1. Boston: Bedford/St. Martins. ISBN 978-1-319-06052-7.
- ——; ——; ——, eds. (2013). Freedom on My Mind: A History of African Americans, Volume 2: Since 1865. Boston: Bedford/St. Martins. ISBN 978-1-319-06053-4.
- Wilentz, Sean (2005). The Rise of American Democracy: Jefferson to Lincoln. New York: W.W. Norton & Company, Inc. ISBN 0-393-05820-4.
- —— (1871). History of the Rise and Fall of the Slave Power in America. Vol. 2. Boston: James R. Osgood and Co.
- Wood, Betty (1997). The Origins of American Slavery: Freedom and Bondage in the English Colonies. New York: Hill and Wang. ISBN 0-8090-7456-7.

=== Regions ===
==== The North ====
- Berlin, Ira; Harris, Leslie M., eds. (2005). Slavery in New York. New York: New Press. ISBN 1-56584-997-3.
- Farrow, Anne (2006). Complicity: How the North Promoted, Prolonged, and Profited from Slavery. New York: Ballantine Books. ISBN 0-345-46783-3.
- Hardesty, Jared Ross (2018). Unfreedom: Slavery and Dependence in Eighteenth-Century Boston. New York: New York University Press. ISBN 978-1-4798-0184-8.
- Hodges, Graham Russell Hodge (1999). Root and Branch: African Americans in New York and East Jersey, 1613—1863. Chapel Hill, NC: The University of North Carolina Press. ISBN 0-8078-2492-5.
- Litwack, Leon F. (1961). North of Slavery: The Negro in the Free States, 1790–1860. Chicago: University of Chicago Press. ISBN 9780226485850.
- Nash, Gary B. (2007). Forging Freedom: The Formation of Philadelphia's Black Community, 1720-1840. Kent, OH: Kent State University Press. ISBN 978-0-87338-565-7.
- Ottley, Roi; Weatherby, William J., eds. (1967). The Negro in New York: An Informal Social History, 1626-1940. New York: Praeger Publishers.
- Whitfield, Harvey Amani (2016). North to Bondage: Loyalist Slavery in the Maritimes. Vancouver, BC: UBC (University of British Columbia) Press. ISBN 978-0-7748-3229-8.
- Young, Cory James (April 2019). "From North to Natchez during the Age of Gradual Abolition". The Pennsylvania Magazine of History and Biography. 143 (2): 117–139. ISSN 0031-4587. JSTOR 10.5215/pennmaghistbio.143.2.0117.

==== The South ====
- Boles, John B. (2015). Black Southerners, 1619–1869. Lexington, KY: University Press of Kentucky. ISBN 978-0-8131-5786-3.
- Breen, T.H.; Innes, Stephen (1980). 'Myne Owne Ground': Race and Freedom on Virginia's Eastern Shore, 1640-1676. New York: Oxford University Press. ISBN 0-19-503206-3.
- Bullock, Henry Allen (1967). A History of Negro Education in the South, from 1619 to the Present. Cambridge, MA: Harvard University Press. ISBN 9780674399501. Bancroft Prize for American History, 1968
- Campbell, Randolph B. (1989). An Empire for Slavery: The Peculiar Institution in Texas, 1821-1865. Baton Rouge, LA: Louisiana State University Press. ISBN 0-8071-1505-3.
- Colburn, David R.; Landers, Jane L., eds. (1995). The African American Heritage of Florida. Gainesville, FL: University Press of Florida. ISBN 0-8130-1332-1.
- Craven, Wesley Frank (1971). White, Red, and Black: The Seventeenth-Century Virginian. Charlottesville, VA: The University Press of Virginia. ISBN 0-8139-0372-6.
- Dunaway, Wilma A. (2003). Slavery in the American Mountain South. New York: Cambridge University Press. ISBN 0-521-81275-5.
- Ely, Melvin Patrick (2004). Israel on the Appomattox: A Southern Experiment in Freedom. New York: Alfred A. Knopf. ISBN 0-679-44738-5. Bancroft Prize for American History, 2005
- Engs, Robert Francis (1979). Freedom's First Generation: Black Hampton, Virginia, 1861-1890. Philadelphia: University of Pennsylvania Press. ISBN 0-8122-7768-6.
- Faust, Drew Gilpin (1977). A Sacred Circle: The Dilemma of the Intellectual in the Old South, 1840-1860. Baltimore: Johns Hopkins University Press. ISBN 0-8018-1967-9.
- Fields, Barbara J. (1985). Slavery and Freedom on the Middle Ground: Maryland During the Nineteenth Century. New Haven, CT: Yale University Press. ISBN 0-300-02340-5.
- Freehling, William W. (1966) [1965]. Prelude to Civil War: The Nullification Controversy in South Carolina, 1816-1836. New York: Oxford University Press. ISBN 0-19-507681-8. Bancroft Prize for American History, 1967
- Genovese, Eugene D.; Fox-Genovese, Elizabeth (2011). Fatal Self-Deception: Slaveholding Paternalism in the Old South. New York: Cambridge University Press. ISBN 978-1-107-01164-9.
- Greenberg, Kenneth S (1996). Honor & Slavery. Princeton, NJ: Princeton University Press. ISBN 0-691-02734-X.
- Hahn, Steven (2003). A Nation Under Our Feet: Black Political Struggles in the Rural South from Slavery to the Great Migration. Cambridge, MA: Belknap Press of Harvard University Press. ISBN 0-674-01169-4. Bancroft Prize for American History, 2004; Pulitzer Prize for History, 2004
- Haskell, Alexander B. (2017). For God, King and People: Forging Commonwealth Bonds in Renaissance Virginia. Chapel Hill, NC: University of North Carolina Press (for the Omohundro Institute of Early American History and Culture, Williamsburg, Virginia). ISBN 9781469618029.
- Ingersoll, Thomas N. (1999). Mammon and Manon in Early New Orleans: The First Slave Society in the Deep South, 1718-1819. Knoxville, TN: The University of Tennessee Press. ISBN 1-57233-023-6.
- Jennison, Watson W. (2012). Cultivating Race: The Expansion of Slavery in Georgia, 1750–1860. Lexington, KY: University Press of Kentucky. ISBN 978-0-8131-3426-0.
- Jewett, Clayton E.; Allen, John O. (2004). Slavery in the South: A State-By-State History. Westport, CT: Greenwood Press. ISBN 0-313-32019-5.
- Kay, Marvin L. Michael; Cary, Lorin Lee (1995). Slavery in North Carolina, 1748-1775. Chapel Hill, NC: The University of North Carolina Press. ISBN 0-8078-2197-7.
- Merritt, Keri Leigh (2017). Masterless Men: Poor Whites and Slavery in the Antebellum South. New York: Cambridge University Press. ISBN 9781107184244.
- Painter, Nell Irvin (2002). Southern History across the Color Line. Chapel Hill, NC: University of North Carolina Press. ISBN 0-8078-2692-8.
- Rutman, Darrett B.; Rutman, Anita H. (1984). A Place in Time: Middlesex County, Virginia, 1650-1750. New York: W.W. Norton & Company, Inc. ISBN 0-393-01801-6.
- Sellers, James Benson (1950). Slavery in Alabama. University, AL: University of Alabama Press.
- Sydnor, Charles S. (1965) [1933]. Slavery in Mississippi. Gloucester, MA: Peter Smith.
- Stampp, Kenneth M. (1956). The Peculiar Institution: Slavery in the Ante-Bellum South. New York: Vintage Books.
- Taylor, Alan (2013). The Internal Enemy: Slavery and War in Virginia, 1772-1832. New York: W.W. Norton & Company. ISBN 978-0-393-07371-3. Pulitzer Prize for History, 2014
- Taylor, Joe Gray (1969) [1963]. Slavery in Louisiana. Metairie, LA: Louisiana Historical Association. ISBN 9780837116372.
- Trexler, Harrison Anthony (1914). Slavery in Missouri, 1804–1865. Lancaster, PA: The New Era Printing Company.
- Wasserman, Adam (2010) [2009]. A People's History of Florida 1513–1876: How Africans, Seminoles, Women, and Lower Class Whites Shaped the Sunshine State. Scotts Valley, California: CreateSpace Independent Publishing Platform. ISBN 978-1-4421670-9-4.
- West, Emily (2004). Chains of Love: Slave Couples in Antebellum South Carolina. Urbana, IL: University of Illinois Press. ISBN 0-252-02903-8.
- Wood, Peter H. (1974). Black Majority: Negroes in Colonial South Carolina from 1670 through the Stono Rebellion. New York: W.W. Norton & Company, Inc. ISBN 0-393-31482-0.

=== Historical eras ===
==== Colonial Era: 16th century—1776 ====
- Bailyn, Bernard (2012). The Barbarous Years: The Peopling of British North America: The Conflict of Civilizations, 1600–1675. New York: Alfred A. Knopf. ISBN 978-0-394-51570-0.
- Eltis, David (2000). The Rise of African Slavery in the Americas. New York: Cambridge University Press. ISBN 0-521-65231-6.
- Hashaw, Tim (2007). The Birth of Black America: The First African Americans and the Pursuit of Freedom at Jamestown. New York: Carroll & Graf Publishers. ISBN 978-0-7867-1718-7.
- Knight, K.I. (2019). Unveiled, the Twenty & Odd: Documenting the First Africans in England's America 1619-1625 and Beyond. Clermont, FL: First Freedom Publishing LLC. ISBN 9781733807708.
- Mancall, Peter, ed. (2018). The Atlantic World and Virginia, 1550-1624. Chapel Hill, NC: The University of North Carolina Press (for the Omohundro Institute of Early American History and Culture, Williamsburg, Virginia). ISBN 978-1-4384-3979-2.
- McKissack, Pat (2004). Hard Labor: The First African Americans. New York: Alladin Paperbacks. ISBN 0-689-86149-4.
- Morgan, Kenneth O. (2000). Slavery and Servitude in North America, 1607–1800. Edinburgh, Scotland: Edinburgh University Press. ISBN 1-85331-210-X.
- Morgan, Jennifer L. (2021). Reckoning with Slavery: Gender, Kinship, and Capitalism in the Early Black Atlantic. Durham, NC: Duke University Press. ISBN 9781478021452.
- Smith, Abbott Emerson (1971) [1947]. Colonists in Bondage: White Servitude and Convict Labor in America, 1607-1776. New York: W.W. Norton & Company, Inc. ISBN 9780393005929.
- —— (2003) [1996]. Strange New Land: Africans in Colonial America. New York: Oxford University Press. ISBN 978-0-19-515823-6.

==== Revolutionary Era: 1776—early 19th century ====
- Berlin, Ira; Hoffman, Ronald, eds. (1983). Slavery and Freedom in the Age of the American Revolution. Charlottesville, VA: University Press of Virginia. ISBN 0-8139-0969-4.
- Blumrosen, Alfred W.; Blumrosen, Ruth G. (2005). Slave Nation: How Slavery United the Colonies and Sparked the American Revolution. Naperville, IL: Sourcebooks, Inc. ISBN 978-1-4022-0697-9.
- Bolton, S. Charles. Fugitivism: Escaping Slavery in the Lower Mississippi Valley, 1820-1860 (University of Arkansas Press, 2019) online
- Countryman, Edward (2012). Enjoy the Same Liberty: Black Americans and the Revolutionary Era. Lanham, MD: Rowman & Littlefield Publishers. ISBN 978-1-4422-0028-9.
- Davis, David Brion (1999) [1975]. The Problem of Slavery in the Age of Revolution, 1770-1823. Baton Rouge, LA: Louisiana State University Press. ISBN 9780195126716. National Book Award for History and Biography, 1976
- Egerton, Douglas R. (2009). Death or Liberty: African Americans and Revolutionary America. New York: Oxford University Press. ISBN 978-0-19-530669-9.
- Kaplan, Sidney (1973). The Black Presence in the Era of the American Revolution, 1770–1800. Greenwich, CT: New York Graphic Society. ISBN 0-8212-0541-2.
- Larson, Edward J. (2023). American Inheritance: Liberty and Slavery in the Birth of a Nation, 1765–1795. New York: W.W. Norton & Company, Inc. ISBN 978-0-393-88220-9.
- Wright, Donald R. (2000) [1990]. African Americans in the Colonial Era: From African Origins Through the American Revolution (2nd ed.). Wheeling, IL: Harlan Davidson, Inc. ISBN 978-0-88295-955-9.

==== Civil War Era: 1850s—1870s ====
- Dunning, William Archibald (1910) [1897]. Essays on the Civil War and Reconstruction and Related Topics. New York: The Macmillan Company.
- Freehling, William W. (2007) [1990]. The Road to Disunion, Volume I: Secessionists at Bay. New York: Oxford University Press. ISBN 978-0-19-505814-7.
- —— (2007) [1990]. The Road to Disunion, Volume II: Secessionists Triumph. New York: Oxford University Press. ISBN 978-0-19-505815-4.
- Litwack, Leon (1979). Been in the Storm So Long: The Aftermath of Slavery. New York: Alfred A. Knopf, Inc. ISBN 978-0394743981. National Book Award for History (paperback), 1981; Pulitzer Prize for History,1980
- Oates, Stephen B. (1997). The Approaching Fury: Voices of the Storm, 1820-1861. New York: HarperCollins Publishers, Inc. ISBN 0-06-01 6784-X.
- Potter, David M. (1976). The Impending Crisis, 1848-1861. New York: Harper & Row. ISBN 0-06-013403-8. Pulitzer Prize for History, 1977
- Sewell, Richard H. (1988). A House Divided: Sectionalism and the Civil War, 1848-1865. Baltimore: Johns Hopkins University Press. ISBN 0-8018-3531-3.

== Biographies ==
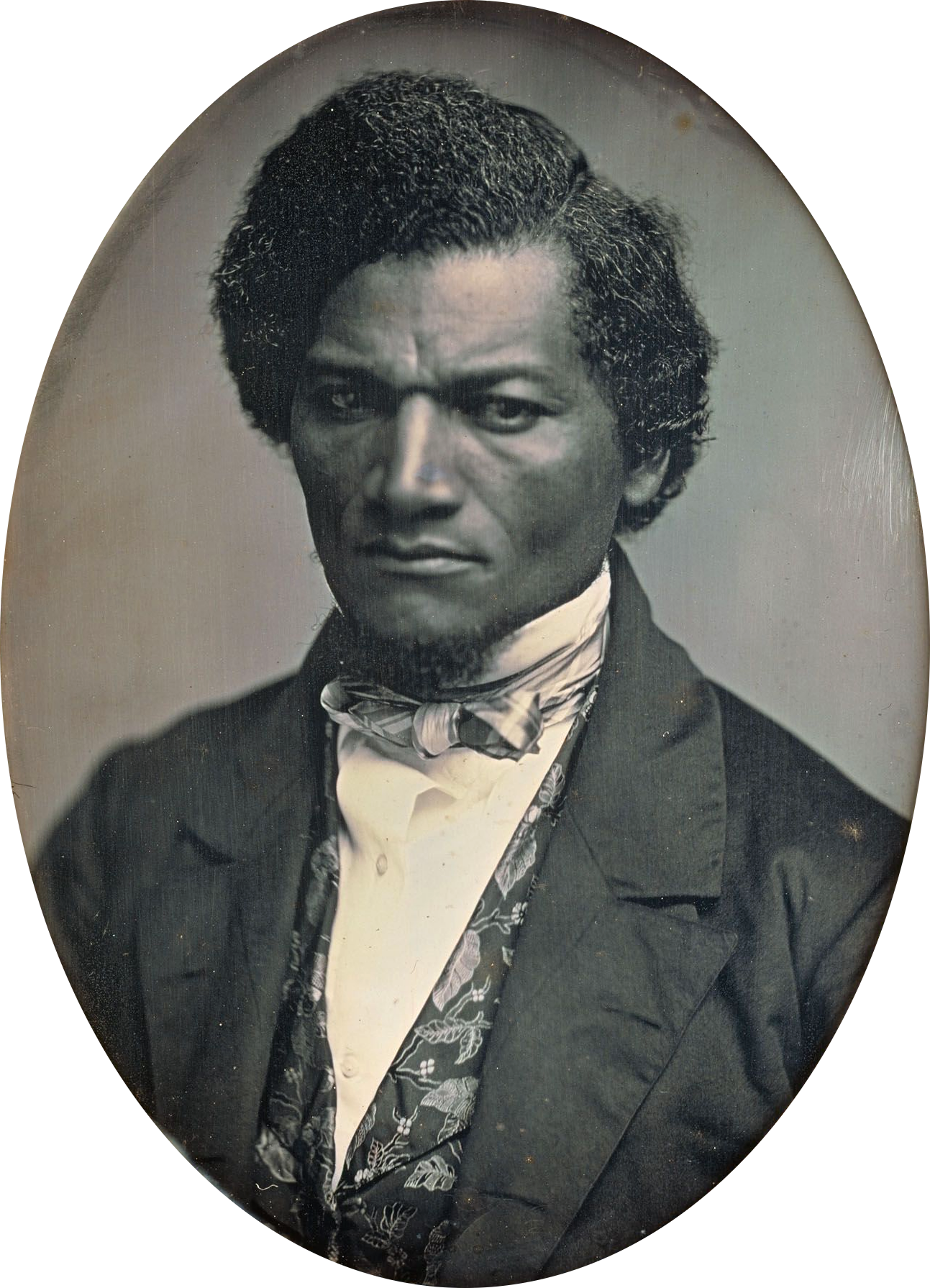
David W. Blight's 2018 biography of abolitionist Frederick Douglass won the Pulitzer Prize for History.

- Alford, Terry (1977). Prince among Slaves. New York: Oxford University Press. ISBN 0-19-504223-9.
- Andrews, William L. (1986). To Tell a Free Story: The First Century of Afro-American Autobiography, 1760-1865. Urbana, IL: University of Illinois Press. ISBN 0-252-01222-4.
- Ball, Edward (1998). Slaves in the Family. New York: Farrar, Straus & Giroux. ISBN 0-374-26582-8. National Book Award for Nonfiction, 1998
- Bell, Malcolm Jr. (1987). Major Butler's Legacy: Five Generations of a Slaveholding Family. Athens, GA: The University of Georgia Press. ISBN 0-8203-0897-8.
- Betts, Robert B. (2000) [1985]. In Search of York: The Slave Who Went to the Pacific with Lewis and Clark. Boulder, CO: University Press of Colorado. ISBN 0-87081-618-7.
- Blight, David W. (2020) [2018]. Frederick Douglass: Prophet of Freedom. New York: Simon & Schuster. ISBN 9781416590316. Pulitzer Prize for History, 2019; Bancroft Prize for American History, 2019
- Bradford, Sarah H. (1981) [1961]. Harriet Tubman: The Moses of Her People. Gloucester, MA: Peter Smith. ISBN 0-8446-1717-2.
- Braxton, Joanne, ed. (1989). Black Women Writing Autobiography: A Tradition within a Tradition. Philadelphia: Temple University Press. ISBN 0-87722-639-3.
- Chesnut, Mary Boykin Miller (1981) [1905]. Woodward, C. Vann (ed.). Mary Chesnut's Civil War. New Haven, CT: Yale University Press. ISBN 0-300-02459-2. Pulitzer Prize for History, 1982
- Collison, Gary (1997). Shadrach Minkins: From Fugitive Slave to Citizen. Cambridge, MA: Harvard University Press. ISBN 0-674-80298-5.
- Egerton, Douglas R. Egerton (1999). He Shall Go Out Free: The Lives of Denmark Vesey. Madison, WI: Madison House. ISBN 0-945612-67-2.
- Faust, Drew Gilpin (1982). James Henry Hammond and the Old South: A Design for Mastery. Baton Rouge, LA: Louisiana State University Press. ISBN 978-0-8071-1048-5.
- Foner, ed. (1971). Nat Turner. Englewood Cliffs, NJ: Prentice-Hall. ISBN 013-933143-3.
- Gordon-Reed, Annette (1997). Thomas Jefferson and Sally Hemings: An American Controversy. Charlottesville, VA: University of Virginia Press. ISBN 0-8139-1698-4.
- Hanks, Stephen (2019). Twenty Africans: Their Story, and Discovery of Their Black, Red, & White Descendants. Portland, OR: Inkwater Press. ISBN 978-1629016573.
- Hinks, Peter P. (1997). To Awaken My Afflicted Brethren: David Walker and the Problem of Antebellum Slave Resistance. University Park, PA: Pennsylvania State University Press. ISBN 0-271-01578-0.
- Hurston, Zora Neale (2018). Barracoon: The Story of the Last "Black Cargo". New York: HarperCollins. ISBN 9780062748225.
- Johnson, Michael P. (1984). Black Masters: A Free Family of Color in the Old South. New York: W.W. Norton & Company, Inc. ISBN 0-393-30314-4.
- Logan, Rayford W.; Winston, Michael R., eds. (1982). Dictionary of American Negro Biography. New York: W.W. Norton & Company, Inc. ISBN 0-393-01513-0.
- McFeely, William S. (1991). Frederick Douglass. New York: W.W. Norton & Company, Inc. ISBN 0-393-31376-X.
- McGinty, Brian (2017). The Rest I Will Kill: William Tillman and the Unforgettable Story of How a Free Black Man Refused to Become a Slave. New York: Liveright Publishing Corporation. ISBN 978-1-63149-301-0.
- Oates, Stephen B. (1984) [1970]. To Purge This Land with Blood: A Biography of John Brown. Amherst, MA: The University of Massachusetts Press. ISBN 0-87023-458-7.
- Pease, Jane H.; Pease, William H. (1972). Bound with Them in Chains: A Biographical History of the Antislavery Movement. Westport, CT: Greenwood Press, Inc. ISBN 0-8371-6265-3.
- Rediker, Marcus (2017). The Fearless Benjamin Lay: The Quaker Dwarf Who Became the First Revolutionary Abolitionist. London: Verso Books. ISBN 978-1-78663-472-6.
- Rhodes, Jane (1999) [1998]. Mary Ann Shadd Cary: The Black Press and Protest in the Nineteenth Century. Bloomington, IN: Indiana University Press. ISBN 0-253-33446-2.
- Rosengarten, Theodore (1974). All God's Dangers: The Life of Nate Shaw. New York: Alfred A. Knopf, Inc. ISBN 0-394-49084-3.
- —— (1987). Tombee: Portrait of a Cotton Planter, with the Plantation Journal of Thomas B. Chaplin (1822-1890). New York: McGraw-Hill Book Company. ISBN 0-07-053821-2.
- Schweninger, Loren (1984). From Tennessee Slave to St. Louis Entrepreneur: The Autobiography of James Thomas. Columbia, MO: University of Missouri Press. ISBN 9780826204318.
- Stauffer, John (2008). Giants: The Parallel Lives of Frederick Douglass and Abraham Lincoln. New York: Twelve. ISBN 978-0-446-54300-2.
- Sterling, Dorothy (1958). Captain of the Planter: The Story of Robert Smalls. Garden City, NY: Doubleday & Company, Inc.
- —— (1971). The Making of an Afro-American: Martin Robison Delany, 1812-1885. Garden City, NY: Doubleday & Company, Inc.
- Taylor, Elizabeth Dowling (2012). A Slave in the White House: Paul Jennings and the Madisons. New York: St. Martin's Press. ISBN 978-1137000187.
- Thomas, Lamont D. (1986). Rise to Be a People: A Biography of Paul Cuffe. Urbana, IL: University of Illinois Press. ISBN 0-252-01212-7.
- Thompson, Mack (1962). Moses Brown, Reluctant Reformer. Chapel Hill, NC: University of North Carolina Press.
- Washington, Booker T. (2003) [1901]. Brundage, W. Fitzhugh (ed.). Up From Slavery: An Autobiography. Boston: Bedford/St. Martins. ISBN 0-312-39448-9.
- Whitten, David O. (1981). Andrew Durnford: A Black Sugar Planter in Antebellum Louisiana. Natchitoches, LA: Northwestern State University Press. ISBN 0917898-06-0.

== Essay collections ==
The following collections explore either related topics or a range of issues tied to slavery. Many of the essays are by leading scholars on the subject.

- Adams, Herbert B., ed. (1969) [1893-1914]. Slavery in the States: Selected Essays. New York: Negro Universities Press. ISBN 9780837120850.
- Aptheker, Herbert (1964). Essays in the History of the American Negro. New York: International Publishers, Inc. ISBN 9780717800612.
- Baptist, Edward E.; Camp, Stephanie M.H., eds. (2006). New Studies in the History of American Slavery. Athens, GA: The University of Georgia Press. ISBN 978-0-8203-2563-7.
- Brooten, Bernadette J., ed. (2010). Beyond Slavery: Overcoming Its Religious and Sexual Legacies. New York: Palgrave Macmillan US. doi:10.1057/9780230113893. ISBN 978-0-230-10017-6.
- Cooper, Frederick; Scott, Rebecca J.; Holt, Thomas C. (2000). Beyond Slavery: Explorations of Race, Labor, and Citizenship in Postemancipation Societies. Chapel Hill, NC: The University of North Carolina Press. ISBN 0-8078-2541-7.
- Countryman, Edward, ed. (1999). How Did American Slavery Begin?: Readings. Boston: Bedford/St. Martin's. ISBN 0-312-18261-9.
- Engerman, Stanley L.; Genovese, Eugene D., eds. (1975). Race and Slavery in the Western Hemisphere: Quantitative Studies. Princeton, NJ: Princeton University Press. ISBN 0-691-10024-1.
- Engerman, Stanley Lewis (1999). Terms of Labor: Slavery, Serfdom, and Free Labor. Stanford, CA: Stanford University Press. ISBN 978-0-8047-3521-6.
- Fredrickson, George M. (1988). The Arrogance of Race: Historical Perspectives on Slavery, Racism, and Social Inequality. Middletown, CT: Wesleyan University Press. ISBN 0-8195-5177-5.
- Freehling, William W. (1994). The Reintegration of American History: Slavery and the Civil War. New York: Oxford University Press. ISBN 0-19-508807-7.
- Gispen, Kees (1990). What Made the South Different?: Essays and Comments. Jackson, MS: University Press of Mississippi. ISBN 0-87805-454-5.
- Nash, Gary B.; Weiss, Richard, eds. (1970). The Great Fear: Race in the Mind of America. New York: Holt, Rinehart and Winston. ISBN 9780030852701.
- Newton, James E.; Lewis, Ronald L., eds. (1978). The Other Slaves: Mechanics, Artisans, and Craftsmen. Boston: G.K. Hall & Co. ISBN 0-8161-8102-0.
- Palmer, Colin A., ed. (1998). The Worlds of Unfree Labour: From Indentured Servitude to Slavery. Brookfield, VT: Ashgate Publishing Company. ISBN 0-86078-515-7.
- Paquette, Robert L.; Smith, Mark M., eds. (2010). The Oxford Handbook of Slavery in the Americas. New York: Oxford University Press. ISBN 978-0-19-922799-0.
- Phillips, Ulrich Bonnell (1968). Genovese, Eugene D. (ed.). The Slave Economy of the Old South: Selected Essays in Economic and Social History. Baton Rouge, LA: Louisiana State University Press.
- Rose, Peter I., ed. (2008) [1970]. Slavery and Its Aftermath. New Brunswick, NJ: AldineTransaction. ISBN 978-0-202-30941-5.
- Sansing, David G. (1978). What Was Freedom's Price?: Essays. Jackson, MS: University Press of Mississippi. ISBN 0-87805-046-9.
- Tate, Thad W.; Ammerman, David, eds. (1979). The Chesapeake in the Seventeenth Century: Essays on Anglo-American Society. New York: W.W. Norton & Company, Inc. ISBN 0-393-00956-4.
- Weinstein, Allen; Gatell, Frank Otto; Sarasohn, David, eds. (1979) [1968]. American Negro Slavery: A Modern Reader. New York: Oxford University Press. ISBN 0-19-502470-2.
- Woodward, C. Vann (1993) [1960]. The Burden of Southern History. Baton Rouge, LA: Louisiana State University Press. ISBN 0-8071-1894-X.

== Encyclopedias ==
- Harper, William; Hammond, James H.; Simms, William Gilmore; Dew, Thomas Roderick (1852). The Pro-Slavery Argument; As Maintained by the Most Distinguished Writers of the Southern States. Charleston, SC: Walker, Richards & Co.
- Kingsley, Zephaniah (2000) [1828]. Stowell, Daniel W. (ed.). Balancing Evils Judiciously: The Proslavery Writings of Zephaniah Kingsley. Gainesville, FL: University Press of Florida. ISBN 9780813021171.

== Topics ==
=== Abolition/anti-slavery ===
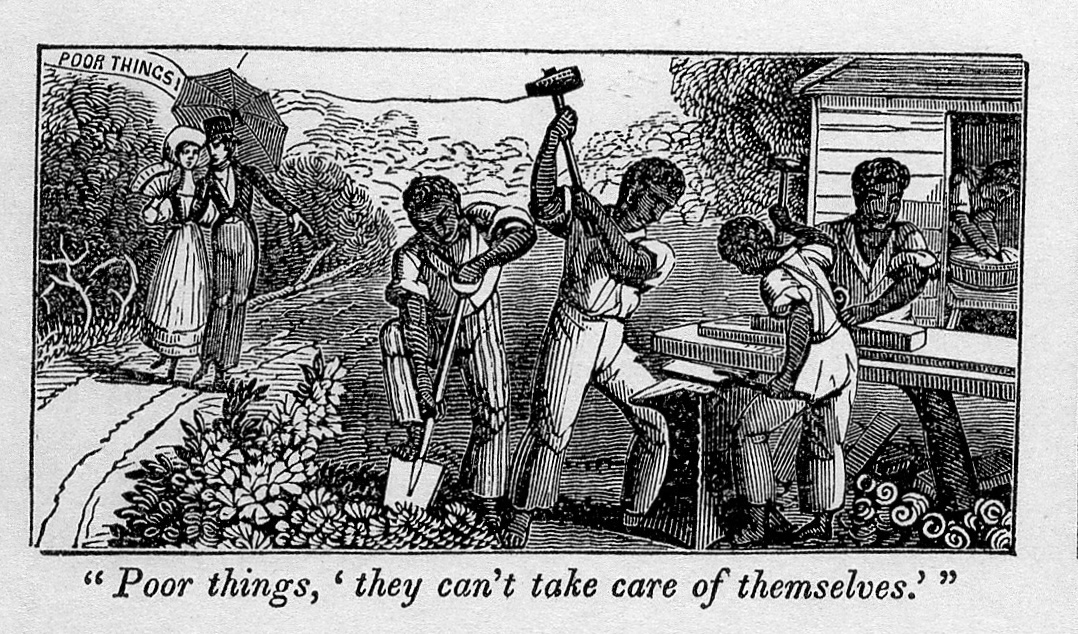
Proslavery arguments held that blacks were incapable of caring for themselves.

- Aptheker, Herbert (1968) [1948]. To Be Free: Studies in American Negro History. New York: International Publishers Co., Inc.
- —— (1989). Abolitionism: A Revolutionary Movement. Boston: Twayne Publishers. ISBN 0-8057-9702-5.
- Barnes, Gilbert Hobbs (1957) [1933]. The Antislavery Impulse, 1830—1844. Gloucester, MA: Peter Smith.
- Blackburn, Robin (1988). The Overthrow of Colonial Slavery. New York: Verso. ISBN 0-86091-188-8.
- Blackett, R.J.M. (1983). Building an Anti-Slavery Wall: Black Americans in the Atlantic Abolitionist Movement, 1830-1860. Baton Rouge, LA: Louisiana State University Press. ISBN 0-8071-1082-5.
- Blackmon, Douglas A. (2008). Slavery by Another Name: The Re-Enslavement of Black Americans from the Civil War to World War II. New York: Doubleday. ISBN 978-0-385-50625-0.
- Bruns, Roger, ed. (1977). Am I Not a Man and a Brother: The Antislavery Crusade of Revolutionary America. New York: Chelsea House. ISBN 0-87754-035-7.
- Coddon, Karin (2004). Black Abolitionists. Farmington Hills, MI: Greenhaven Press. ISBN 0-7377-1711-4.
- Colman, Julia; Thompson, Matilda G. (1859). The Child's Anti-Slavery Book: Containing a Few Words about American Slave Children and Stories of Slave-Life. New York: Carlton & Porter.
- Cutter, Martha J. (2017). The Illustrated Slave: Empathy, Graphic Narrative, and the Visual Culture of the Transatlantic Abolition Movement, 1800-1852. Athens, GA: The University of Georgia Press. ISBN 9780820351162.
- Davis, David Brion (1970) [1966]. The Problem of Slavery in Western Culture. London: Pelican Books.
- —— (2015) [2014]. The Problem of Slavery in the Age of Emancipation. New York: Knopf Doubleday Publishing Group. ISBN 9780307389695. National Book Critics Circle Award for Nonfiction, 2014
- Dillon, Merton L. (1974). The Abolitionists: The Growth of a Dissenting Minority. DeKalb, IL: Northern Illinois University Press. ISBN 0-87580-044-0.
- Dottin, Paul Anthony (2002). The End of Race as We Know It: Slavery, Segregation, and the African American Quest for Redress. Boca Raton, FL: Florida Atlantic University. ISBN 9780493912769.
- Dumond, Dwight Lowell (1966) [1961]. Antislavery: The Crusade for Freedom in America. New York: W.W. Norton & Company, Inc.
- Foner, Eric (2016). The Slave's Cause: A History of Abolition. New Haven, CT: Yale University Press. ISBN 978-0-300-18137-1.
- Gellman, David Nathaniel (2006). Emancipating New York: The Politics of Slavery and Freedom, 1777–1827. Baton Rouge, LA: Louisiana State University. ISBN 978-0-8071-3174-9.
- Goodell, William (1844). Views of American Constitutional Law in Its Bearing Upon American Slavery. Utica, NY: Jackson & Chaplin.
- Grover, Kathryn (2001). The Fugitive's Gibraltar: Escaping Slaves and Abolitionism in New Bedford. Amherst, MA: University of Massachusetts Press. ISBN 1-55849-271-2.
- Hammond, John Craig; Mason, Matthew, eds. (2011). Contesting Slavery: The Politics of Bondage and Freedom in the New American Nation. Charlottesville, VA: University of Virginia Press. ISBN 978-0-8139-3105-0.
- Harrold, Stanley. American Abolitionism: Its Direct Political Impact from Colonial Times into Reconstruction (U of Virginia Press, 2019) online.
- Harrold, Stanley (2001). American Abolitionists. New York: Longman. ISBN 0-582-35738-1.
- Hinks, Peter; McKivigan, John, eds. (2015). Abolition and Antislavery: A Historical Encyclopedia of the American Mosaic. Santa Barbara, CA: Greenwood, ABC-CLIO, LLC. ISBN 978-1-61069-827-6.
- Hochschild, Adam (2005). Bury the Chains: Prophets and Rebels in the Fight to Free an Empire's Slaves. Boston: Houghton Mifflin. ISBN 0-618-10469-0.
- Kraditor, Aileen S. (1969) [1967]. Means and Ends in American Abolitionism: Garrison and His Critics on Strategy and Tactics, 1834-1850. Chicago: Vintage Books. ISBN 9780394708492.
- Locke, Mary Stoughton (1965) [1901]. Anti-Slavery in America, from the Introduction of African Slaves to the Prohibition of the Slave Trade. Gloucester, MA: Peter Smith.
- Mathews, Donald G., ed. (1972). Agitation for Freedom: The Abolitionist Movement. New York: John Wiley & Sons. ISBN 0-471-57623-9.
- McCarthy, Timothy Patrick; Stauffer, John, eds. (2006). Prophets of Protest: Reconsidering the History of American Abolitionism. New York: New Press. ISBN 978-1-56584-992-1.
- McKivigan, John R., ed. (1999). Abolitionism and American Law. New York: Garland Publishing, Inc. ISBN 0-8153-3109-6.
- McPherson, James M. (1975). The Abolitionist Legacy: From Reconstruction to the NAACP. Princeton, NJ: Princeton University Press. ISBN 0-691-04637-9.
- —— (1995). The Struggle for Equality: Abolitionists and the Negro in the Civil War and Reconstruction. Princeton, NJ: Princeton University Press. ISBN 978-0691005553.
- Moore, Wilbert E. (1971). American Negro Slavery and Abolition: A Sociological Study. New York: The Third Press.
- Morgan, Edmund S. (1995) [1975]. American Slavery, American Freedom: The Ordeal of Colonial Virginia. New York: W.W. Norton & Company, Inc. ISBN 0-393-31288-7.
- Mullin, Michael, ed. (1976). American Negro Slavery: A Documentary History. Columbia, SC: University of South Carolina Press. ISBN 0-87249-339-3.
- Nellis, Eric Guest (2013). Shaping the New World: African Slavery in the Americas, 1500-1888. New York: University of Toronto Press, Inc. ISBN 978-1-4426-0764-4.
- Newman, Richard; Rael, Patrick; Lapsansky, Philip, eds. (2001). Pamphlets of Protest: An Anthology of Early African-American Protest Literature, 1790-1860. New York: Routledge. ISBN 0-415-92443-X.
- O'Brien, James Bronterre (1885). The Rise, Progress, and Phases of Human Slavery: How It Came into the World and How It Shall Be Made to Go Out. London: William Reeves.
- Oakes, James (2007). The Radical and the Republican: Frederick Douglass, Abraham Lincoln, and the Triumph of Antislavery Politics. New York: W.W. Norton & Company, Inc. ISBN 978-0-393-06194-9.
- —— (2013). Freedom National: The Destruction of Slavery in the United States, 1861-1865. New York: W.W. Norton & Company, Inc. ISBN 978-0-393-06531-2.
- —— (2014). The Scorpion's Sting: Antislavery and the Coming of the Civil War. New York: W.W. Norton & Company, Inc. ISBN 978-0-393-23993-5.
- —— (2021). The Crooked Path to Abolition: Abraham Lincoln and the Antislavery Constitution. New York: W.W. Norton & Company, Inc. ISBN 9781324005865.
- Pease, Jane H.; Pease, William H. (1972). Bound with Them in Chains: A Biographical History of the Antislavery Movement. Westport, CT: Greenwood Press, Inc. ISBN 0-8371-6265-3.
- Perry, Lewis (1973). Radical Abolitionism: Anarchy and the Government of God in Antislavery Thought. Ithaca, NY: Cornell University Press. ISBN 0-8014-0754-0.
- —— (1981) [1979]. Antislavery Reconsidered: New Perspectives on the Abolitionists. Baton Rouge, LA: Louisiana State University Press. ISBN 0-8071-0479-5.
- Quarles, Benjamin (1972) [1969]. Black Abolitionists. New York: Oxford University Press. ISBN 0-19-500804-9.
- Rael, Patrick (2015). Eighty-Eight Years: The Long Death of Slavery in the United States, 1777–1865. Athens, GA: University of Georgia Press. ISBN 978-0-8203-3395-3.
- Rhodes, Jane (1999) [1998]. Mary Ann Shadd Cary: The Black Press and Protest in the Nineteenth Century. Bloomington, IN: Indiana University Press. ISBN 0-253-33446-2.
- Ripley, C. Peter (1985). The Black Abolitionist Papers, Volume I: The British Isles, 1830-1865. Chapel Hill, NC: The University of North Carolina Press. ISBN 0-8078-1625-6. 1st of 5 volumes
- —— (1985). The Black Abolitionist Papers, Volume II: Canada, 1830-1865. Chapel Hill, NC: The University of North Carolina Press. ISBN 0-8078-1698-1. 2nd of 5 volumes
- ——, ed. (2015) [2007]. Encyclopedia of Emancipation and Abolition in the Transatlantic World, Vols. 1-3. New York: Routledge. ISBN 978-0-7656-1257-1.
- Root, Erik S. (2008). All Honor to Jefferson?: The Virginia Slavery Debates and the Positive Good Thesis. Lanham, MD: Lexington Books. ISBN 978-0-7391-2217-4.
- Scott, John Anthony (1978) [1974]. Hard Trials on My Way: Slavery and the Struggle Against It, 1800-1860. New York: New American Library. ISBN 0-3948-2045-2.
- Senior, Nassau William (1856). American Slavery. London: T. Fellowes.
- Sewell, Richard H. (1965). John P. Hale and the Politics of Abolition. Cambridge, MA: Harvard University Press. ISBN 9780674433243.
- —— (1976). Ballots for Freedom: Antislavery Politics in the United States, 1837-1860. New York: Oxford University Press. ISBN 9780393009668.
- Sinha, Manisha (2016). The Slave's Cause: A History of Abolition. New Haven, CT: Yale University Press. ISBN 978-0-300-18208-8. Frederick Douglass Book Prize.
- Stewart, James Brewer (1976). Holy Warriors: The Abolitionists and American Slavery. New York: Hill and Wang. ISBN 0-8090-5519-8.
- Striner, Richard (2006). Father Abraham: Lincoln's Relentless Struggle to End Slavery. New York: Oxford University Press. ISBN 978-0-19-518306-1.
- Thompson, Mack (1962). Moses Brown, Reluctant Reformer. Chapel Hill, NC: University of North Carolina Press.
- Thurston, Richard Bowers; Baldwin, Abraham Chittenden; Williston, Timothy (1857). Three Prize Essays on American Slavery. Boston: Congregational Board of Publications.
- Vorenberg, Michael (2001). Final Freedom: The Civil War, the Abolition of Slavery, and the Thirteenth Amendment. New York: Cambridge University Press. ISBN 0-521-65267-7.
- Walters, Ronald G. (1984) [1978]. The Antislavery Appeal: American Abolitionism after 1830. Baltimore: Johns Hopkins University Press. ISBN 0-393-95444-7.
- Wiecek, William M. (1977). The Sources of Antislavery Constitutionalism in America, 1760–1848. Ithaca, NY: Cornell University Press. ISBN 0-8014-1089-4.
- Wilentz, Sean (2018). No Property in Man: Slavery and Antislavery at the Nation's Founding. Cambridge, MA: Harvard University Press. ISBN 9780674972223.
- Winch, Julie (2016). Between Slavery and Freedom: Free People of Color in America from Settlement to the Civil War. Lanham, MD: Rowman & Littlefield. ISBN 978-0-7425-5114-5.
- Yellin, Jean Fagan (1994). The Abolitionist Sisterhood: Women's Political Culture in Antebellum America. Ithaca, NY: Cornell University Press. ISBN 0-8014-2728-2.
- Zdrok-Ptaszek, Jodie, ed. (2002). The Anti-Slavery Movement. San Diego, CA: Greenhaven Press. ISBN 0-7377-1047-0.
- Zilversmit, Arthur (1967). The First Emancipation: The Abolition of Slavery in the North. Chicago: University of Chicago Press.

=== Agriculture/plantations ===
- Armstead, Myra Beth Young (2012). Freedom's Gardener: James F. Brown, Horticulture, and the Hudson Valley in Antebellum America. New York: New York University Press. ISBN 978-0-8147-0510-0.
- Ball, Edward (1998). Slaves in the Family. New York: Farrar, Straus & Giroux. ISBN 0-374-26582-8.
- Beckert, Sven (2014). Empire of Cotton: A Global History. New York: Alfred A. Knopf. ISBN 978-0-375-41414-5. Bancroft Prize for American History, 2015
- Bell, Malcolm Jr. (1987). Major Butler's Legacy: Five Generations of a Slaveholding Family. Athens, GA: The University of Georgia Press. ISBN 0-8203-0897-8.
- Berlin, Ira; Morgan, Philip D. (1993). Cultivation and Culture: Labor and the Shaping of Slave Life in the Americas. Charlottesville, VA: University Press of Virginia. ISBN 0-8139-1421-3.
- Berry, Daina Ramey (2010). Swing the Sickle for the Harvest Is Ripe: Gender and Slavery in Antebellum Georgia. Urbana, IL: University of Illinois Press. ISBN 978-0-252-03146-5.
- Blassingame, John Wesley (1979). The Slave Community: Plantation Life in the Antebellum South. New York: Oxford University Press. ISBN 0-19-502562-8.
- Bowman, Shearer Davis (1993). Masters and Lords: Mid-Nineteenth Century U.S. Planters and Prussian Junkers. New York: Oxford University Press. ISBN 0-19-505281-1.
- Bruce, Philip Alexander (1907). Social Life of Virginia in the Seventeenth Century: An Inquiry into the Origin of the Higher Planting Class, Together with an Account of the Habits, Customs, and Diversions of the People. Richmond, VA: Whittet & Shepperson.
- Carney, Judith A.; Rosomoff, Richard Nicholas (2009). In the Shadow of Slavery: Africa's Botanical Legacy in the Atlantic World. Berkeley, CA: University of California Press. ISBN 978-0-520-25750-4.
- Dunn, Richard S. (1973). Sugar and Slaves: The Rise of the Planter Class in the English West Indies, 1624-1713. New York: W.W. Norton & Company, Inc. ISBN 0-393-00692-1.
- Easterby, J.H., ed. (1945). The South Carolina Rice Plantation as Revealed in the Papers of Robert F.W. Allston. Chicago: University of Chicago Press.
- Fox-Genovese, Elizabeth (1988). Within the Plantation Household: Black and White Women of the Old South. Chapel Hill, NC: The University of North Carolina Press. ISBN 0-8078-1808-9.
- Genovese, Eugene D. (1971) [1969]. The World the Slaveholders Made. New York: Vintage Books.
- Glymph, Thavolia (2008). Out of the House of Bondage: The Transformation of the Plantation Household. New York: Cambridge University Press. ISBN 978-0-521-87901-9.
- Gray, Lewis Cecil (1958) [1933]. History of Agriculture in the Southern United States to 1860, Vol. 1. Gloucester, MA: Peter Smith.
- —— (1958) [1933]. History of Agriculture in the Southern United States to 1860, Vol. 2. Gloucester, MA: Peter Smith.
- Johnson, Walter (2013). River of Dark Dreams: Slavery and Empire in the Cotton Kingdom. Cambridge, MA: Belknap Press of Harvard University Press. ISBN 978-0-674-04555-2.
- King, Wilma (1997) [1995]. Stolen Childhood: Slave Youth in Nineteenth-Century America. Bloomington, IN: Indiana University Press. ISBN 0-253-32904-3.
- Kulikoff, Allan (1986). Tobacco and Slaves: The Development of Southern Cultures in the Chesapeake, 1680–1800. Chapel Hill, NC: University of North Carolina Press. ISBN 0-8078-1671-X.
- —— (1992). The Agrarian Origins of American Capitalism. Charlottesville, VA: University of Virginia Press. ISBN 0-8139-1388-8.
- Littlefield, Daniel C. (1981). Rice and Slaves: Ethnicity and the Slave Trade in Colonial South Carolina. Baton Rouge, LA: Louisiana State University Press. ISBN 0-8071-0794-8.
- Main, Gloria L. (1982). Tobacco Colony: Life in Early Maryland, 1650-1720. Princeton, NJ: Princeton University Press. ISBN 0-691-04693-X.
- Morgan, Lynda J. (1992). Emancipation in Virginia's Tobacco Belt, 1850-1870. Athens, GA: University of Georgia Press. ISBN 0-8203-1415-3.
- Phillips, Ulrich Bonnell (1918). American Negro Slavery: A Survey of the Supply, Employment and Control of Negro Labor as Determined by the Plantation Regime. New York: D. Appleton and Co.
- Reidy, Joseph P. (1992). From Slavery to Agrarian Capitalism in the Cotton Plantation South, Central Georgia, 1800–1880. Chapel Hill, NC: University of North Carolina Press. ISBN 0-8078-2061-X.
- Scarborough, William Kauffman (1966). The Overseer: Plantation Management in the Old South. Baton Rouge, LA: Louisiana State University Press.
- Small, Stephen; Eichstedt, Jennifer (2002). Representations of Slavery: Race and Ideology in Southern Plantation Museums. Washington, DC: Smithsonian Institution Press. ISBN 1-58834-071-6.
- Smith, Julia Floyd (1973). Slavery and Plantation Growth in Antebellum Florida, 1821–1860. Gainesville, FL: University of Florida Press. ISBN 0-8130-0323-7.
- Smith, Mark M. (1997). Mastered by the Clock: Time, Slavery, and Freedom in the American South. Chapel Hill, NC: University of North Carolina Press. ISBN 0-8078-2344-9.
- Vincent, Stephen A. (1999). Southern Seed, Northern Soil: African-American Farm Communities in the Midwest, 1765-1900. Bloomington, IN: Indiana University Press. ISBN 0-253-33577-9.
- Vlach, John Michael (1993). Back of the Big House: The Architecture of Plantation Slavery. Chapel Hill, NC: University of North Carolina Press. ISBN 0-8078-2085-7.
- Walsh, Lorena S. (2010). Motives of Honor, Pleasure, and Profit: Plantation Management in the Colonial Chesapeake, 1607-1763. Chapel Hill, NC: University of North Carolina Press (for the Omohundro Institute of Early American History and Culture, Williamsburg, Virginia). ISBN 978-0-8078-3234-9.
- Wright, Gavin (1978). The Political Economy of the Cotton South: Households, Markets, and Wealth in the Nineteenth Century. New York: W.W. Norton & Company, Inc. ISBN 0-393-05686-4.
- Yafa, Stephen (2005). Big Cotton: How a Humble Fiber Created Fortunes, Wrecked Civilizations, and Put America on the Map. Viking. ISBN 0-670-03367-7.

=== Constitution/law ===
- Allain, Jean (2012). The Legal Understanding of Slavery: From the Historical to the Contemporary. New York: Oxford University Press. ISBN 9780199660469.
- Belz, Herman (1978). Emancipation and Equal Rights: Politics and Constitutionalism in the Civil War Era. New York: W.W. Norton & Company, Inc. ISBN 0-393-05692-9.
- Bogues, Anthony; Cliatt, Cass; Levy, Allison, eds. (2021) [2006]. Slavery and Justice Report (PDF). Providence, RI: Brown University's Steering Committee on Slavery and Justice.
- Brewster, Francis E. (1850). Slavery and the Constitution. Both Sides of the Question. Philadelphia: unknown publisher.
- Campbell, James M. (2013). Crime and Punishment in African American History. New York: Palgrave Macmillan. ISBN 978-0-230-27380-1.
- Fede, Andrew (1992). People Without Rights: An Interpretation of the Fundamentals of the Law of Slavery in the U.S. South. New York: Garland Publishing, Inc. ISBN 0-8153-0894-9.
- Fehrenbacher, Don E. (1978). The Dred Scott Case: Its Significance in American Law and Politics. New York: Oxford University Press. ISBN 0-19-502403-6. Pulitzer Prize for History, 1979
- —— (1981). Slavery, Law, and Politics: The Dred Scott Case in Historical Perspective. New York: Oxford University Press. ISBN 0-19-502882-1.
- Finkelman, Paul (1981). An Imperfect Union: Slavery, Federalism, and Comity. Chapel Hill, NC: University of North Carolina Press. ISBN 0-8078-1438-5.
- —— (1997). Dred Scott v. Sandford: A Brief History with Documents. Boston: Bedford Books. ISBN 0-312-12807-X.
- ——, ed. (2002). Slavery & The Law. Lanham, MD: Rowman & Littlefield. ISBN 0-945612-36-2.
- Goldstone, Lawrence (2005). Dark Bargain: Slavery, Profits, and the Struggle for the Constitution. New York: Walker & Company. ISBN 0-8027-1460-9.
- Goldwin, Robert A.; Kaufman, Art, eds. (1988). Slavery and Its Consequences: The Constitution, Equality, and Race. Washington, DC: American Enterprise Institute for Public Policy Research. ISBN 0-8447-3649-X.
- Harris, J. William (2009). The Hanging of Thomas Jeremiah: A Free Black Man's Encounter with Liberty. New Haven, CT: Yale University Press. ISBN 978-0-300-15214-2.
- Higginbotham, A. Leon (1978). In the Matter of Color: Race and the American Legal Process: The Colonial Period. New York: Oxford University Press. ISBN 0-19-502387-0.
- Howard, Warren S. (1963). American Slavers and the Federal Law, 1837-1862. Berkeley, CA: University of California Press.
- Lynd, Staughton, ed. (1968). Class Conflict, Slavery, and the United States Constitution: Ten Essays. Indianapolis, IN: Bobbs-Merrill.
- Morris, Thomas D. (1974). Free Men All: The Personal Liberty Laws of the North, 1780-1860. Baltimore: Johns Hopkins University Press. ISBN 9781584771074.
- —— (1996). Southern Slavery and the Law, 1619–1860. Chapel Hill: University of North Carolina Press. ISBN 0-8078-4817-4.
- Tsesis, Alexander (2004). The Thirteenth Amendment and American Freedom: A Legal History. New York: New York University Press. ISBN 0-8147-8276-0.
- —— (2008). We Shall Overcome: A History of Civil Rights and the Law. New Haven, CT: Yale University Press. ISBN 978-0-300-11837-7.
- Tushnet, Mark V. (1981). The American Law of Slavery, 1810-1860: Considerations of Humanity and Interest. Princeton, NJ: Princeton University Press. ISBN 978-0-691-65702-8.
- Van Cleve, George William (2010). A Slaveholders' Union: Slavery, Politics, and the Constitution in the Early American Republic. Chicago: University of Chicago Press. ISBN 978-0-226-84668-2.
- Wiecek, William M. (1977). The Sources of Antislavery Constitutionalism in America, 1760–1848. Ithaca, NY: Cornell University Press. ISBN 0-8014-1089-4.

=== Economics/capitalism ===
- Aitken, Hugh G.J., ed. (1971). Did Slavery Pay?: Readings in the Economics of Slavery in the United States. Boston: Houghton Mifflin Company. ISBN 9780395112373.
- Ashworth, John (1995). Slavery, Capitalism, and Politics in the Antebellum Republic. New York: Cambridge University Press. ISBN 0-521-47487-6.
- Bales, Kevin (1999). Disposable People: New Slavery in the Global Economy. Berkeley, CA: University of California Press. ISBN 0-520-21797-7.
- Bateman, Fred; Weiss, Thomas (1980). A Deplorable Scarcity: The Failure of Industrialization in the Slave Economy. Chapel Hill, NC: University of North Carolina Press. ISBN 0-8078-1447-4.
- —— (2014). The Half Has Never Been Told: Slavery and the Making of American Capitalism. New York: Basic Books. ISBN 978-0-465-00296-2.
- ——; Rockman, Seth, eds. (2016). Slavery's Capitalism: A New History of American Economic Development. Philadelphia: University of Pennsylvania Press. ISBN 978-0-8122-4841-8.
- Berlin, Ira; Morgan, Philip D. (1991). The Slaves' Economy: Independent Production by Slaves in the Americas. Portland, OR: Frank Cass. ISBN 0-7146-3436-0.
- Bruce, Philip Alexander (1935) [1895]. Economic History of Virginia in the Seventeenth Century, Volume I. New York: The Macmillan Company.
- —— (1935) [1895]. Economic History of Virginia in the Seventeenth Century, Volume II. New York: The Macmillan Company.
- Conrad, Alfred H.; Meyer, John R. (1964). The Economics of Slavery, and Other Studies in Econometric History. Chicago: Aldine Publishing Company.
- Fogel, Robert William; Engerman, Stanley L. (1995). Time on the Cross: The Economics of American Negro Slavery. New York: W.W. Norton & Company, Inc. ISBN 0-393-31218-6.
- Galenson, David W. (1981). White Servitude in Colonial America: An Economic Analysis. New York: Cambridge University Press. ISBN 0-521-23686-X.
- Genovese, Eugene D. (1966) [1961]. The Political Economy of Slavery: Studies in the Economy and Society of the Slave South. New York: Pantheon Books.
- ——; Fox-Genovese, Elizabeth (1983). Fruits of Merchant Capital: Slavery and Bourgeois Property in the Rise and Expansion of Capitalism. New York: Oxford University Press. ISBN 0-19-503157-1.
- Gutman, Herbert George (1975). Slavery and the Numbers Game: A Critique of Time on the Cross. Urbana, IL: University of Illinois Press. ISBN 0-252-00564-3.
- Hudson, Larry E. Jr. (1994). Working toward Freedom: Slave Society and Domestic Economy in the American South. Rochester, NY: University of Rochester Press. ISBN 1-878822-37-3.
- Huston, James L. (2003). Calculating the Value of the Union: Slavery, Property Rights, and the Economic Origins of the Civil War. Chapel Hill, NC: The University of North Carolina Press. ISBN 0-8078-2804-1.
- —— (1992). The Agrarian Origins of American Capitalism. Charlottesville, VA: University of Virginia Press. ISBN 0-8139-1388-8.
- Kranz, Rachel (2004). African-American Business Leaders and Entrepreneurs. New York: Facts On File, Inc. ISBN 0-8160-5101-1.
- Marable, Manning (1983). How Capitalism Underdeveloped Black America: Problems in Race, Political Economy, and Society. Boston: South End Press. ISBN 0-89608-165-6.
- McCusker, John J.; Menard, Russell R. (1985). The Economy of British America, 1607-1789. Chapel Hill, NC: University of North Carolina Press (for the Institute of Early American History and Culture). ISBN 0-8078-1635-3.
- McGlynn, Frank; Drescher, Seymour (1992). The Meaning of Freedom: Economics, Politics, and Culture After Slavery. Pittsburgh: University of Pittsburgh Press. ISBN 0-8229-3695-X.
- Phillips, Ulrich Bonnell (1968). Genovese, Eugene D. (ed.). The Slave Economy of the Old South: Selected Essays in Economic and Social History. Baton Rouge, LA: Louisiana State University Press.
- Reidy, Joseph P. (1992). From Slavery to Agrarian Capitalism in the Cotton Plantation South, Central Georgia, 1800–1880. Chapel Hill, NC: University of North Carolina Press. ISBN 0-8078-2061-X.
- Satre, Lowell J. (2005). Chocolate on Trial: Slavery, Politics, and the Ethics of Business. Athens, OH: Ohio University Press. ISBN 0-8214-1625-1.
- Schermerhorn, Jack Lawrence; Schermerhorn, Calvin (2015). The Business of Slavery and the Rise of American Capitalism, 1815-1860. New Haven, CT: Yale University Press. ISBN 978-0-300-19200-1.
- Williams, Eric Eustace (1966). Capitalism and Slavery. New York: G.P. Putnam's Sons. ISBN 9780399500398.
- Wright, Gavin (1978). The Political Economy of the Cotton South: Households, Markets, and Wealth in the Nineteenth Century. New York: W.W. Norton & Company, Inc. ISBN 0-393-05686-4.
- —— (2006). Slavery and American Economic Development. Baton Rouge, LA: Louisiana State University Press. ISBN 978-0-8071-3183-1.

=== Emancipation/freedom ===
- Arnold, Isaac Newton (1867). The History of Abraham Lincoln, and the Overthrow of Slavery. Chicago: Clarke & Co., Publishers.
- Ayers, Edward L. (2017). The Thin Light of Freedom: The Civil War and Emancipation in the Heart of America. New York: W.W. Norton & Company, Inc. ISBN 978-0-393-29263-3.
- Bennett, Lerone Jr. (2007) [1999]. Forced into Glory: Abraham Lincoln's White Dream. Chicago: Johnson Publishing. ISBN 978-0-87485-085-7.
- Berlin, Ira; Hoffman, Ronald, eds. (1983). Slavery and Freedom in the Age of the American Revolution. Charlottesville, VA: University Press of Virginia. ISBN 0-8139-0969-4.
- —— (1992) [1974]. Slaves Without Masters: The Free Negro in the Antebellum South. New York: The New Press. ISBN 1-56584-028-3.
- ——; Fields, Barbara J.; Miller, Steven F.; Reidy, Joseph P.; Rowland, Leslie S. (1992). Free at Last: A Documentary History of Slavery, Freedom, and the Civil War. New York: The New Press. ISBN 1-56584-015-1.
- ——; ——; ——; ——; —— (1992). Slaves No More: Three Essays on Emancipation and the Civil War. New York: Cambridge University Press. ISBN 0-521-43102-6.
- Blackburn, Robin (2011). The American Crucible: Slavery, Emancipation and Human Rights. London; New York: Verso. ISBN 978-1-84467-569-2.
- Blair, William A.; Younger, Karen Fisher, eds. (2009). Lincoln's Proclamation: Emancipation Reconsidered. Chapel Hill, NC: The University of North Carolina Press. ISBN 978-0-8078-3316-2.
- Brewster, Todd (2014). Lincoln's Gamble: The Tumultuous Six Months that Gave America the Emancipation Proclamation and Changed the Course of the Civil War. New York: Scribner. ISBN 978-1-4516-9386-7.
- Bruce, Philip Alexander (1889). The Plantation Negro as a Freeman: Observations on His Character, Condition, and Prospects in Virginia. New York: G.P. Putnam's Sons.
- Carnahan, Burrus M. (2007). Act of Justice: Lincoln's Emancipation Proclamation and the Law of War. Lexington, KY: The University Press of Kentucky. ISBN 978-0-8131-2463-6.
- Cohen, David William; Greene, Jack P., eds. (1974). Neither Slave Nor Free: The Freedman of African Descent in the Slave Societies of the New World. Baltimore: Johns Hopkins University Press. ISBN 0-8018-1374-3.
- Duncan, Russell (1986). Freedom's Shore: Tunis Campbell and the Georgia Freedmen. Athens, GA: The University of Georgia Press. ISBN 0-8203-0876-5.
- Durden, Robert F. (1972). The Gray and the Black: The Confederate Debate on Emancipation. Baton Rouge, LA: Louisiana State University Press. ISBN 0-8071-0244-X.
- Engerman, Stanley L. (2007). Slavery, Emancipation & Freedom: Comparative Perspectives. Baton Rouge, LA: Louisiana State University Press. ISBN 978-0-8071-3236-4.
- Fields, Barbara J. (1985). Slavery and Freedom on the Middle Ground: Maryland During the Nineteenth Century. New Haven, CT: Yale University Press. ISBN 0-300-02340-5.
- Foner, Eric; Brown, Joshua (2005). Forever Free: The Story of Emancipation and Reconstruction. New York: Alfred A. Knopf. ISBN 0-375-40259-4.
- —— (2010). The Fiery Trial: Abraham Lincoln and American Slavery. New York: W.W. Norton & Company, Inc. ISBN 978-0-393-06618-0. Bancroft Prize for American History, 2011; Pulitzer Prize for History, 2011
- Gerteis, Louis S. (1973). From Contraband to Freedman: Federal Policy Toward Southern Blacks, 1861-1865. Westport, CT: Greenwood Press. ISBN 0-19-507681-8.
- Guelzo, Allen C. (2004). Lincoln's Emancipation Proclamation: The End of Slavery in America. New York: Simon & Schuster. ISBN 0-7432-2182-6.
- Halpern, Rick; Dal Lago, Enrico, eds. (2002). Slavery and Emancipation. Malden, MA: Blackwell Publishing Ltd. ISBN 0-631-21734-7.
- Hanger, Kimberly S. (2006) [1997]. Bounded Lives, Bounded Places: Free Black Society in Colonial New Orleans, 1769-1803. Durham, NC: Duke University Press. ISBN 0-8223-1906-3.
- Harding, Vincent (1981). There Is a River: The Black Struggle for Freedom in America. New York: Harcourt Brace Jovanovich. ISBN 0-15-689089-5.
- Hashaw, Tim (2007). The Birth of Black America: The First African Americans and the Pursuit of Freedom at Jamestown. New York: Carroll & Graf Publishers. ISBN 978-0-7867-1718-7.
- Holzer, Harold (2012). Lincoln: How Abraham Lincoln Ended Slavery in America. New York: Newmarket Press for ItBooks. ISBN 978-0-06-226511-1.
- —— (2015). A Just and Generous Nation: Abraham Lincoln and the fight for American Opportunity. New York: Basic Books. ISBN 978-0-465-02830-6.
- Horton, James O.; Horton, Lois (1999) [1979]. Black Bostonians: Family Life and Community Struggle in the Antebellum North. New York: Holmes & Meir. ISBN 0-8419-1379-X.
- —— (1997). In Hope of Liberty: Culture, Community and Protest among Northern Free Blacks. New York: Oxford University Press. ISBN 0-19-504732-X.
- Howard, Victor B. (1983). Black Liberation in Kentucky: Emancipation and Freedom, 1862-1864. Lexington, KY: The University Press of Kentucky. ISBN 0-8131-1433-0.
- Johnson, Michael P. (1984). Black Masters: A Free Family of Color in the Old South. New York: W.W. Norton & Company, Inc. ISBN 0-393-30314-4.
- Jones, Howard (1999). Abraham Lincoln and a New Birth of Freedom: The Union and Slavery in the Diplomacy of the Civil War. Lincoln, NE: University of Nebraska Press. ISBN 0-8032-2582-2.
- Kachun, Mitch (2003). Festivals of Freedom: Memory and Meaning in African American Emancipation Celebrations, 1808–1915. Amherst, MA: University of Massachusetts Press. ISBN 1-55849-407-3.
- Larson, Edward J. (2023). American Inheritance: Liberty and Slavery in the Birth of a Nation, 1765–1795. New York: W.W. Norton & Company, Inc. ISBN 978-0-393-88220-9.
- Levine, Lawrence W. (2007) [1977]. Black Culture and Black Consciousness: Afro-American Folk Thought from Slavery to Freedom. New York: Oxford University Press. ISBN 978-0-19-530569-2.
- Litwack, Leon F. (1961). North of Slavery: The Negro in the Free States, 1790–1860. Chicago: University of Chicago Press. ISBN 9780226485850.
- Long, David E. (1994). The Jewel of Liberty: Abraham Lincoln's Re-Election and the End of Slavery. Mechanicsburg, PA: Stackpole Books. ISBN 978-0-8117-3441-7.
- Morgan, Edmund S. (1995) [1975]. American Slavery, American Freedom: The Ordeal of Colonial Virginia. New York: W.W. Norton & Company, Inc. ISBN 0-393-31288-7.
- Nash, Gary B.; Soderlund, Jean R. (1991). Freedom by Degrees: Emancipation in Pennsylvania and Its Aftermath. New York: Oxford University Press. ISBN 0-19-504583-1.
- Oakes, James (1990). Slavery and Freedom: An Interpretation of the Old South. New York: Alfred A. Knopf, Inc. ISBN 0-394-53677-0.
- Patterson, Orlando (1991). Freedom in the Making of Western Culture. New York: Basic Books.
- Proenza-Coles, Christina (2019). American Founders: How People of African Descent Established Freedom in the New World. Montgomery, AL: New South Books. ISBN 9781588383310.
- Ripley, C. Peter (1976). Slaves and Freedmen in Civil War Louisiana. Baton Rouge, LA: Louisiana State University Press. ISBN 0-8071-0187-7.
- Roberts, John W. (1989). From Trickster to Badman: The Black Folk Hero in Slavery and Freedom. Philadelphia: University of Pennsylvania. ISBN 0-8122-8141-1.
- Rodriguez, Junius P., ed. (2015) [2007]. Encyclopedia of Emancipation and Abolition in the Transatlantic World, Vols. 1-3. New York: Routledge. ISBN 978-0-7656-1257-1.
- Rugemer, Edward Bartlett (2008). The Problem of Emancipation: The Caribbean Roots of the American Civil War. Baton Rouge, LA: Louisiana State University Press. ISBN 978-0-8071-3338-5.
- Sansing, David G. (1978). What Was Freedom's Price?: Essays. Jackson, MS: University Press of Mississippi. ISBN 0-87805-046-9.
- Schweninger, Loren (1997). Black Property Owners in the South, 1790-1915. Urbana, IL: University of Illinois Press. ISBN 0-252-01678-5.
- Sherrard, Owen Aubrey (1973). Freedom from Fear: The Slave and His Emancipation. Westport, CT: Greenwood Press. ISBN 0-8371-7024-9.
- Smith, Elbert B. (1967). The Death of Slavery: The United States, 1837-65. Chicago: The University of Chicago Press.
- Smith, Mark M. (1997). Mastered by the Clock: Time, Slavery, and Freedom in the American South. Chapel Hill, NC: University of North Carolina Press. ISBN 0-8078-2344-9.
- Zilversmit, Arthur (1967). The First Emancipation: The Abolition of Slavery in the North. Chicago: University of Chicago Press.

=== Government/politics ===
- Anbinder, Tyler (1992). Nativism and Slavery: The Northern Know Nothings and the Politics of the 1850s. New York: Oxford University Press. ISBN 0-19-507233-2.
- Ashworth, John (1995). Slavery, Capitalism, and Politics in the Antebellum Republic. New York: Cambridge University Press. ISBN 0-521-47487-6.
- Baker, Jean H. (1984). Affairs of Party: The Political Culture of Mid-Nineteenth Century Democrats. Ithaca, NY: Cornell University Press. ISBN 0-8014-1513-6.
- Belz, Herman (1978). Emancipation and Equal Rights: Politics and Constitutionalism in the Civil War Era. New York: W.W. Norton & Company, Inc. ISBN 0-393-05692-9.
- Berwanger, Eugene H. (1967). The Frontier against Slavery: Western Anti-Negro Prejudice and the Slavery Extension Controversy. Urbana, IL: University of Illinois Press.
- ——; Simpson, Brooks D. (2007) [1997]. Union and Emancipation: Essays on Politics and Race in the Civil War Era. Kent, OH: Kent State University Press. ISBN 978-0-87338-951-8.
- Brady, Steven J. (2022). Chained to History: Slavery and U.S. Foreign Relations to 1865. Ithaca, NY: Cornell University Press. ISBN 9781501761058.
- Bynum, Victoria E. (1992). Unruly Women: The Politics of Social and Sexual Control in the Old South. Chapel Hill, NC: The University of North Carolina Press. ISBN 0-8078-2016-4.
- Childers, Christopher (2012). The Failure of Popular Sovereignty: Slavery, Manifest Destiny, and the Radicalization of Southern Politics. Lawrence: University Press of Kansas. ISBN 978-0-7006-1868-2.
- Cowie, Jefferson (2022). Freedom's Dominion: A Saga of White Resistance to Federal Power. New York: Basic Books. ISBN 9781541672819. Pulitzer Prize for History, 2023
- Fehrenbacher, Don E. (1978). The Dred Scott Case: Its Significance in American Law and Politics. New York: Oxford University Press. ISBN 0-19-502403-6. Pulitzer Prize for History, 1979
- Finkelman, Paul (2010). In the Shadow of Freedom: The Politics of Slavery in the National Capital. Athens, OH: Ohio University Press (for the United States Capitol Historical Society). ISBN 978-0-8214-1934-2.
- Foner, Eric (1995) [1970]. Free Soil, Free Labor, Free Men: The Ideology of the Republican Party Before the Civil War. New York: Oxford University Press. ISBN 0-19-501352-2.
- —— (1980). Politics and Ideology in the Age of the Civil War. New York: Oxford University Press. ISBN 0-19-502781-7.
- Freehling, Alice Goodyear (1982). Drift Toward Dissolution: The Virginia Slavery Debate of 1831–1832. Baton Rouge, LA: Louisiana State University Press. ISBN 0-8071-1035-3.
- Holt, Michael (1983) [1978]. The Political Crisis of the 1850s. New York: W.W. Norton & Company, Inc. ISBN 0-393-95370-X.
- —— (1968). Intellectual Origins of American Radicalism. New York: Pantheon Books.
- Mason, Matthew (2006). Slavery and Politics in the Early American Republic. Chapel Hill, NC: University of North Carolina Press. ISBN 978-0-8078-3049-9.
- McGlynn, Frank; Drescher, Seymour (1992). The Meaning of Freedom: Economics, Politics, and Culture After Slavery. Pittsburgh: University of Pittsburgh Press. ISBN 0-8229-3695-X.
- Miller, William Lee (1996) [1995]. Arguing about Slavery: The Great Battle in the United States Congress. New York: Alfred A. Knopf, Inc. ISBN 0-394-56922-9.
- Nagel, Paul C. (1964). One Nation Indivisible: The Union in American Thought, 1776-1861. New York: Oxford University Press.
- Robinson, Donald L. (1970). Slavery in the Structure of American Politics, 1765–1820. New York: Harcourt Brace Jovanovich. ISBN 0-15-182972-1.
- Sewell, Richard H. (1965). John P. Hale and the Politics of Abolition. Cambridge, MA: Harvard University Press. ISBN 9780674433243.
- —— (1976). Ballots for Freedom: Antislavery Politics in the United States, 1837-1860. New York: Oxford University Press. ISBN 9780393009668.
- Silbey, Joel H. (1985). The Partisan Imperative: The Dynamics of American Politics Before the Civil War. New York: Oxford University Press. ISBN 0-19-503551-8.
- Smith, William Henry (1903). A Political History of Slavery: Being an Account of the Slavery Controversy from the Earliest Agitation in the Eighteenth Century to the Close of the Reconstruction Period in America. New York: G.P. Putnam's Sons.

=== Material culture ===
- Katz-Hyman, Martha B.; Rice, Kym S., eds. (2010). World of a Slave: Encyclopedia of the Material Life of Slaves in the United States. Santa Barbara, CA: Greenwood. ISBN 978-0-313-34942-3.
- McGill, Joseph Jr.; Frazier, Herb (2023). Sleeping with the Ancestors: How I Followed the Footprints of Slavery. New York: Hachette Books. ISBN 9780306829666.
- Vlach, John Michael (1991). By the Work of Their Hands: Studies in Afro-American Folklife. Charlottesville, VA: University Press of Virginia. ISBN 978-0-8139-1366-7.

=== Native Americans ===
- Craven, Wesley Frank (1971). White, Red, and Black: The Seventeenth-Century Virginian. Charlottesville, VA: The University Press of Virginia. ISBN 0-8139-0372-6.
- Halliburton, R. Jr. (1977). Red over Black: Black Slavery among the Cherokee Indians. Westport, CT: Greenwood Press. ISBN 0-8371-9034-7.
- Katz, William Loren (1997) [1986]. Black Indians: A Hidden Heritage. New York: Aladdin Paperbacks, Simon & Schuster. ISBN 978-1442446373.
- Lauber, Almon Wheeler (1913). Indian Slavery in Colonial Times Within the Present Limits of the United States. Studies in History, Economics, and Public Law. Vol. 54. New York: Columbia University.
- Littlefield, Daniel F. Jr. (1977). Africans and Seminoles: From Removal to Emancipation. Westport, CT: Greenwood Press. ISBN 0-8371-9529-2.
- Lopenzina, Drew (2012). Red Ink: Native Americans Picking Up the Pen in the Colonial Period. Albany, NY: State University of New York Press. ISBN 978-1-4384-3979-2.
- —— (2017). Through an Indian's Looking-Glass: A Cultural Biography of William Apess, Pequot. Amherst, MA: University of Massachusetts Press. ISBN 9781625342584.
- Minges, Patrick N. (2003). Slavery in the Cherokee Nation: The Keetoowah Society and the Defining of a People, 1855–1867. New York: Routledge. ISBN 0-415-94586-0.
- Mulroy, Kevin (2016). The Seminole Freedmen: A History. Norman, OK: University of Oklahoma Press. ISBN 978-0-8061-3865-7.
- Nash, Gary B. (1974). Red, White, and Black: The Peoples of Early America. Englewood Cliffs, NJ: Prentice-Hall. ISBN 0-13-769810-0.
- Olexer, Barbara (2005) [1982]. The Enslavement of the American Indian in Colonial Times. Columbia, MD: Joyous Publishing. ISBN 0-9722740-4-9.
- Perdue, Theda (1979). Slavery and the Evolution of Cherokee Society, 1540–1866. Knoxville, TN: University of Tennessee Press. ISBN 978-0870495304.
- Reséndez, Andrés (2016). The Other Slavery: The Uncovered Story of Indian Enslavement in America. New York: Houghton Mifflin Harcourt. ISBN 978-0544947108. Bancroft Prize for American History, 2017
- Roundtree, Helen (2006). Pocahontas, Powhatan, Opechancanough: Three Indian Lives Changed by Jamestown. Charlottesville, VA: University of Virginia Press. ISBN 978-0-8139-2596-7.
- Snyder, Christina (2010). Slavery in Indian Country: The Changing Face of Captivity in Early America. Cambridge, MA: Harvard University Press. ISBN 978-0-674-04890-4.
- Sturm, Circe (2002). Blood Politics: Race, Culture, and Identity in the Cherokee Nation of Oklahoma. Berkeley, CA: University of California Press. ISBN 978-0-520-23097-2.
- Wasserman, Adam (2010) [2009]. A People's History of Florida 1513–1876: How Africans, Seminoles, Women, and Lower Class Whites Shaped the Sunshine State. Scotts Valley, California: CreateSpace Independent Publishing Platform. ISBN 978-1-4421670-9-4.
- Yarbrough, Fay A. (2008). Race and the Cherokee Nation: Sovereignty in the Nineteenth Century. Philadelphia: University of Pennsylvania Press. ISBN 978-0-8122-4056-6.

=== Proslavery ===
- Ambrose, Douglas (1997). Henry Hughes and Proslavery Thought in the Old South. Baton Rouge, LA: Louisiana State University Press. ISBN 0-8071-2080-4.
- Armstrong, George D. (1857). The Christian Doctrine of Slavery. New York: Charles Scribner.
- Faust, Drew Gilpin, ed. (1981). Ideology of Slavery: Proslavery Thought in the Antebellum South, 1830-1860. Baton Rouge, LA: University of Louisiana Press. ISBN 0-8071-0855-3.
- Jenkins, William Sumner (1960). Pro-Slavery Thought in the Old South. Gloucester, MA: Peter Smith.
- McKitrick, Eric L., ed. (1963). Slavery Defended: The Views of the Old South. Englewood Cliffs, NJ: Prentice-Hall.
- Smith, John David (1985). An Old Creed for the New South: Proslavery Ideology and Historiography, 1865-1918. Westport, CT: Greenwood Press. ISBN 0-313-23648-8.
- Tise, Larry E. (1987). Proslavery: A History of the Defense of Slavery in America, 1701-1840. Athens, GA: University of Georgia Press. ISBN 0-8203-0927-3.

=== Race/racism ===
- Arthur, John (2007). Race, Equality, and the Burdens of History. Cambridge: Cambridge University Press. ISBN 978-0-521-87937-8.
- Berwanger, Eugene H. (1967). The Frontier against Slavery: Western Anti-Negro Prejudice and the Slavery Extension Controversy. Urbana, IL: University of Illinois Press.
- Blight, David W.; Simpson, Brooks D. (2007) [1997]. Union and Emancipation: Essays on Politics and Race in the Civil War Era. Kent, OH: Kent State University Press. ISBN 978-0-87338-951-8.
- Breen, T.H.; Innes, Stephen (1980). 'Myne Owne Ground': Race and Freedom on Virginia's Eastern Shore, 1640-1676. New York: Oxford University Press. ISBN 0-19-503206-3.
- Brown, Kathleen M. (1996). Good Wives, Nasty Wenches, and Anxious Patriarchs: Gender, Race, and Power in Colonial Virginia. Chapel Hill, NC: University of North Carolina Press (for the Omohundro Institute of Early American History and Culture, Williamsburg, Virginia). ISBN 0-8078-2307-4.
- Bruce, Dickson (2001). The Origins of African American Literature, 1680-1865. Charlottesville, VA: University of Virginia Press. ISBN 0-8139-2066-3.
- Byrd, W. Michael; Clayton, Linda A. (2000). An American Health Dilemma, Volume I: A Medical History of African Americans and the Problem of Race, Beginnings to 1900. New York: Routledge. ISBN 0-415-92449-9.
- ——; —— (2002). An American Health Dilemma: Volume II: Race, Medicine, and Health Care in the United States, 1900-2000. New York: Routledge. ISBN 0-415-92737-4.
- Capitani, Diane N. (2009). Truthful Pictures: Slavery Ordained by God in the Domestic Sentimental Novel of the Nineteenth-Century South. Lanham, MD: Lexington Books. ISBN 978-0-7391-1232-8.
- Cooley, Thomas (2001). The Ivory Leg in the Ebony Cabinet: Madness, Race, and Gender in Victorian America. Amherst, MA: University of Massachusetts Press. ISBN 1-55849-284-4.
- Currie, Stephen (2011). African American Literature. Detroit, MI: Lucent Books, Gale, Cengage Learning. ISBN 978-1-4205-0383-8.
- Degler, Carl N. (1971). Neither Black Nor White: Slavery and Race Relations in Brazil and the United States. New York: The Macmillan Company. Bancroft Prize for American History, 1972
- Dew, Charles B. (2016). The Making of a Racist: A Southerner Reflects on Family, History, and the Slave Trade. Charlottesville, VA: University of Virginia Press. ISBN 9780813938875.
- Engerman, Stanley L.; Genovese, Eugene D., eds. (1975). Race and Slavery in the Western Hemisphere: Quantitative Studies. Princeton, NJ: Princeton University Press. ISBN 0-691-10024-1.
- Finkelman, Paul (1996). Slavery and the Founders: Race and Liberty in the Age of Jefferson. Armonk, NY: M.E. Sharpe. ISBN 1-56324-590-6.
- Fredrickson, George M. (1971). The Black Image in the White Mind: The Debate on Afro-American Character and Destiny, 1817–1914. New York: Harper & Row. ISBN 0-8195-6188-6.
- —— (1988). The Arrogance of Race: Historical Perspectives on Slavery, Racism, and Social Inequality. Middletown, CT: Wesleyan University Press. ISBN 0-8195-5177-5.
- Gates, Henry Louis Jr., ed. (2009). Lincoln on Race and Slavery. Princeton, NJ: Princeton University Press. ISBN 978-0-691-14234-0.
- Gerbner, Katharine (2018). Christian Slavery: Conversion and Race in the Protestant Atlantic World. Philadelphia: University of Pennsylvania Press. ISBN 9780812294903.
- Gilbert, Lisa (February 2018). "Resistance within Enslavement as a Case Study for Personhood in American History". The History Teacher. 51 (2): 221–246. ISSN 0018-2745.
- Goldwin, Robert A.; Kaufman, Art, eds. (1988). Slavery and Its Consequences: The Constitution, Equality, and Race. Washington, DC: American Enterprise Institute for Public Policy Research. ISBN 0-8447-3649-X.
- Gomez, Michael A. (1998). Exchanging Our Country Marks: The Transformation of African Identities in the Colonial and Antebellum South. Chapel Hill, NC: The University of North Carolina Press. ISBN 0-8078-2387-2.
- Grant, Madison (1933). The Conquest of a Continent, or the Expansion of Races in America. New York: Charles Scribner's Sons.
- Handlin, Oscar; Handlin, Mary (1957). Race and Nationality in American Life. Boston: Little, Brown and Company.
- Higginbotham, A. Leon (1978). In the Matter of Color: Race and the American Legal Process: The Colonial Period. New York: Oxford University Press. ISBN 0-19-502387-0.
- Hill, Herbert; Jones, James E. Jr., eds. (1993). Race in America: The Struggle for Equality. Madison, WI: The University of Wisconsin Press. ISBN 0-299-13420-2.
- Hodges, Graham Russell Hodge (1999). Root and Branch: African Americans in New York and East Jersey, 1613—1863. Chapel Hill, NC: The University of North Carolina Press. ISBN 0-8078-2492-5.
- Hudson, Larry E. Jr. (1994). Working Toward Freedom: Slave Society and Domestic Economy in the American South. Rochester, NY: University of Rochester Press. ISBN 1-878822-37-3.
- Johnston, James H. (1970). Race Relations in Virginia and Miscegenation in the South, 1776-1860. Amherst, MA: University of Massachusetts Press.
- Jordan, Winthrop D. (1968). White Over Black: American Attitudes toward the Negro, 1550-1812. Chapel Hill, NC: University of North Carolina Press (for the Institute of Early American History and Culture at Williamsburg, VA). Bancroft Prize for American History, 1969; National Book Award for History and Biography, 1969
- —— (1974). The White Man's Burden: Historical Origins of Racism in the United States. New York: Oxford University Press. ISBN 0-19-501743-9.
- Jones, Martha S. (2018). Birthright Citizens: A History of Race and Rights in Antebellum America. New York: Cambridge University Press. ISBN 9781107150348.
- Kiple, Kenneth F.; King, Virginia Himmeisteib (2003). Another Dimension to the Black Diaspora: Diet, Disease, and Racism. Cambridge, UK: Cambridge University Press. ISBN 0-521-23664-9.
- Lander, James (2010). Lincoln & Darwin: Shared Visions of Race, Science, and Religion. Carbondale, IL: Southern Illinois University Press. ISBN 978-0-8093-2990-8.
- Manganelli, Kimberly Snyder (2012). Transatlantic Spectacles of Race: The Tragic Mulatta and the Tragic Muse. New Brunswick, NJ: Rutgers University Press. ISBN 978-0-8135-4987-3.
- Morgan, Marcyliena (2002). Language, Discourse and Power in African American Culture. New York: Cambridge University Press. ISBN 978-0-521-00149-6.
- Nash, Gary B.; Weiss, Richard, eds. (1970). The Great Fear: Race in the Mind of America. New York: Holt, Rinehart and Winston. ISBN 9780030852701.
- Phillips, Patrick (2016). Blood at the Root: A Racial Cleansing in America. New York: W.W. Norton & Company, Inc. ISBN 978-0393293012.
- Pope, Joanne (1998). Disowning Slavery: Gradual Emancipation and "Race" in New England. Ithaca, NY: Cornell University Press. ISBN 0-8014-3413-0.
- Roediger, David R. (1991). The Wages of Whiteness: Race and the Making of the American Working Class. London: Verso Books. ISBN 0-86091-334-1.
- Rothman, Joshua D. (2003). Notorious in the Neighborhood: Sex and Interracial Relationships Across the Color Line in Virginia, 1787–1861. Chapel Hill, NC: University of North Carolina Press. ISBN 978-0-8078-2768-0.
- Rucker, Walter C. (2006). The River Flows On: Black Resistance, Culture, and Identity Formation in Early America. Baton Rouge, LA: Louisiana State University Press. ISBN 0-8071-3109-1.
- Smedley, Audrey (1999). Race in North America: Origin and Evolution of a Worldview. Boulder, CO: Westview Press. ISBN 0-8133-3448-9.
- Smith, John David (1999). Slavery, Race, and American History: Historical Conflict, Trends, and Method, 1866-1953. Armonk, NY: M.E. Sharpe. ISBN 0-7656-0377-2.
- Sommerville, Diane Miller (2004). Rape and Race in the Nineteenth-Century South. Chapel Hill, NC: The University of North Carolina Press. ISBN 0-8078-5560-X.
- Sowell, Thomas (2005). Black Rednecks and White Liberals. New York: Encounter Books. ISBN 1-59403-086-3.
- Strauss, Jill; Ford, Dionne; LaNier, Shannon; Westrick, A.B. (2019). Slavery's Descendants: Shared Legacies of Race and Reconciliation. New Brunswick, NJ: Rutgers University Press. ISBN 9781978800786.
- Washington, Booker T. (1909). The Story of the Negro: The Rise of the Race from Slavery, Volume I. New York: Association Press (National Association for the Advancement of Colored People).
- —— (1909). The Story of the Negro: The Rise of the Race from Slavery, Volume II. New York: Association Press (National Association for the Advancement of Colored People).
- West, Emily (2004). Chains of Love: Slave Couples in Antebellum South Carolina. Urbana, IL: University of Illinois Press. ISBN 0-252-02903-8.
- Wilder, Craig Steven (2013). Ebony & Ivy: Race, Slavery, and the Troubled History of America's Universities. New York: Bloomsbury Press. ISBN 978-1-59691-681-4.
- Wilkins, Carolyn M. (2010). Damn Near White: An African American Family's Rise from Slavery to Bittersweet Success. Columbia, MO: University of Missouri Press. ISBN 978-0-8262-1899-5.
- Williamson, Joel (1980). New People: Miscegenation and Mulattoes in the United States. New York: Free Press. ISBN 0-02-934790-4.
- —— (1984). The Crucible of Race: Black-White Relations in the American South Since Emancipation. New York: Oxford University Press. ISBN 0-19-503382-5.
- Woodward, C. Vann (1971). American Counterpoint: Slavery and Racism in the North-South Dialogue. Boston: Little, Brown & Company.
- —— (1971). American Counterpoint: Slavery and Racism in the North-South Dialogue. Boston: Little, Brown & Company.

=== Slave trade ===
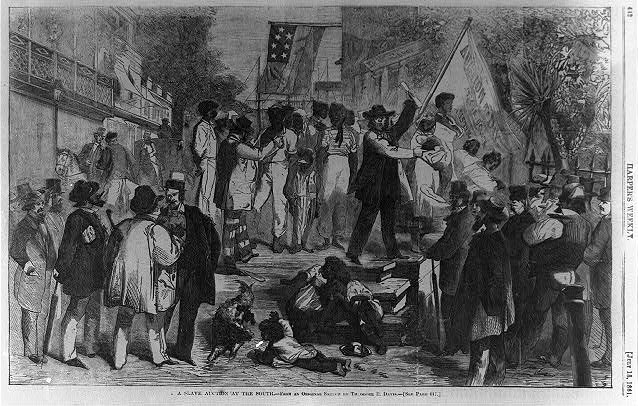
Engraving of a slave auction in the Southern United States.

- Araujo, Ana Lucia (2017). Reparations for Slavery and the Slave Trade: A Transnational and Comparative History. Bloomsbury. ISBN 978-1-3500-1059-8.
- Bailyn, Bernard (1986). Voyagers to the West: A Passage in the Peopling of America on the Eve of the Revolution. New York: Alfred A. Knopf. ISBN 0-394-51569-2.
- Blake, W.O. (1859) [1857]. The History of Slavery and the Slave Trade, Ancient and Modern. Columbus, OH: unknown publisher.
- Bracey, John H. Jr.; Sinha, Manisha (2004). African American Mosaic: A Documentary History from the Slave Trade to the Twenty-First Century, Volume One: To 1877. Upper Saddle River, NJ: Prentice Hall. ISBN 0-13-092287-0.
- Burnside, Madeleine; Robotham, Rosemarie (1997). Spirits of the Passage: The Transatlantic Slave Trade in the Seventeenth Century. Key West, FL: Mel Fisher Maritime Heritage Society. ISBN 0-684-81819-1.
- Coughtry, Jay (1981). The Notorious Triangle: Rhode Island and the African Slave Trade, 1700–1807. Philadelphia: Temple University Press. ISBN 0-87722-218-5.
- Curtin, Philip D. (1969). The Atlantic Slave: A Census. Madison, WI: The University of Wisconsin Press.
- Dew, Charles B. (2016). The Making of a Racist: A Southerner Reflects on Family, History, and the Slave Trade. Charlottesville, VA: University of Virginia Press. ISBN 9780813938875.
- Diedrich, Maria; Gates, Henry Louis Jr.; Pedersen, Carl, eds. (1999). Black Imagination and the Middle Passage. New York: Oxford University Press. ISBN 0-19-512640-8.
- Diène, Doudou, ed. (2001). From Chains to Bonds: The Slave Trade Revisited. New York: Berghahn Book. ISBN 1-57181-265-2.
- Domingues da Silva, Daniel B. (2017). The Atlantic Slave Trade from West Central Africa, 1780-1867. New York: Cambridge University Press. ISBN 978-1-107-17626-3.
- Dow, George Francis (1968) [1927]. Slave Ships and Slaving. Salem, MA: Cornell Maritime Press, Inc.
- Du Bois, W.E.B. (1896). The Suppression of the African Slave Trade to the United States of America, 1638-1870. New York: Longmans, Green, & Co., Publishers.
- Gemery, Henry A.; Hogendorn, Jan S., eds. (1979). The Uncommon Market: Essays in the Economic History of the Atlantic Slave Trade. New York: Academic Press. ISBN 0-12-279850-3.
- Gomez, Michael (2005). Reversing Sail: A History of the African Diaspora. New York: Cambridge University Press. ISBN 0-521-80662-3.
- Grindal, Peter (2016). Opposing the Slavers: The Royal Navy's Campaign against the Atlantic Slave Trade. London: I.B. Tauris & Co. Ltd. ISBN 978-1-78453-387-8.
- Horne, Gerald (2007). The Deepest South: The United States, Brazil, and the African Slave Trade. New York: New York University Press. ISBN 978-0-8147-3688-3.
- Inikori, J.E.; Engerman, Stanley L., eds. (1992). The Atlantic Slave Trade: Effects on Economies, Societies and Peoples in Africa, the Americas, and Europe. Durham, NC: Duke University Press. ISBN 0822312433.
- Johnson, Walter (1999). Soul by Soul: Life inside the Antebellum Slave Market. Cambridge, MA: Harvard University Press. ISBN 0-674-82148-3.
- Klein, Herbert S. (1978). The Middle Passage: Comparative Studies in the Atlantic Slave Trade. Princeton, NJ: Princeton University Press. ISBN 0-691-03119-3.
- Klein, Herbert S. (2010). The Atlantic Slave Trade. New York: Cambridge University Press. ISBN 978-0-521-18250-8.
- Linebaugh, Peter; Rediker, Marcus (2000). The Many-Headed Hydra: Sailors, Slaves, Commoners, and the Hidden History of the Revolutionary Atlantic. Boston: Beacon Press. ISBN 0-8070-5006-7.
- Littlefield, Daniel C. (1981). Rice and Slaves: Ethnicity and the Slave Trade in Colonial South Carolina. Baton Rouge, LA: Louisiana State University Press. ISBN 0-8071-0794-8.
- Locke, Mary Stoughton (1965) [1901]. Anti-Slavery in America, from the Introduction of African Slaves to the Prohibition of the Slave Trade. Gloucester, MA: Peter Smith.
- Mannix, Daniel P.; Cowley, Malcolm (1965) [1962]. Black Cargoes: A History of the Atlantic Slave Trade, 1518-1865. New York: The Viking Press, Inc.
- Martínez, Jenny S. (2012). The Slave Trade and the Origins of International Human Rights Law. New York: Oxford University Press. ISBN 978-0-19-539162-6.
- O'Malley, Gregory E. (2014). Final Passages: The Intercolonial Slave Trade of British America, 1619-1807. Chapel Hill, NC: The University of North Carolina Press (for the Omohundro Institute of Early American History and Culture, Williamsburg, Virginia). ISBN 978-1-4696-1534-9.
- Pope-Hennessy, James (1968). Sins of the Fathers: A Study of the Atlantic Slave Traders, 1441-1807. Alfred A. Knopf, Inc.
- Rawley, James A. (1981). The Transatlantic Slave Trade: A History. New York: W.W. Norton & Company, Inc. ISBN 0-393-01471-1.
- Rediker, Marcus B. (2007). The Slave Ship: A Human History. New York: Viking. ISBN 978-0-670-01823-9.
- —— (2014). Outlaws of the Atlantic: Sailors, Pirates, and Motley Crews in the Age of Sail. Boston: Beacon Press. ISBN 978-0-8070-3410-1.
- Reynolds, Edward (1985). Stand the Storm: A History of the Atlantic Slave Trade. New York: Allison & Busby. ISBN 0-85031-575-1.
- Rivers, Larry Eugene (2000). Slavery in Florida: Territorial Days to Emancipation. Gainesville, FL: University Press of Florida. ISBN 0-8130-1813-7.
- Schafer, Daniel L. (2013). Zephaniah Kingsley Jr. and the Atlantic World: Slave Trader, Plantation Owner, Emancipator. Gainesville, FL: University Press of Florida. ISBN 978-0813044620.
- Smallwood, Stephanie E. (2007). Saltwater Slavery: A Middle Passage from Africa to the American Diaspora. Cambridge, MA: Harvard University Press. ISBN 978-0-674-02349-9.
- Tadman, Michael (1989). Speculators and Slaves: Masters, Traders, and Slaves in the Old South. Madison, WI: University of Wisconsin Press. ISBN 0-299-11850-9.
- Thomas, Hugh (1997). The Slave Trade: The Story of the Atlantic Slave Trade, 1440–1870. New York: Simon and Schuster. ISBN 0-684-81063-8.

=== Religion ===
- Drake, Thomas E. (1965) [1950]. Quakers and Slavery in America. Gloucester, MA: Peter Smith.
- George, Carol V.R. (1973). Segregated Sabbaths; Richard Allen and the Emergence of Independent Black Churches 1760–1840. New York: Oxford University Press.
- Martin, Joan M. (2000). More Than Chains and Toil: A Christian Work Ethic of Enslaved Women. Louisville, KY: Westminster John Knox Press. ISBN 0-664-25800-X.
- Stark, Rodney (2003). For the Glory of God: How Monotheism Led to Reformations, Science, Witch-hunts, and the End of Slavery. Princeton, NJ: Princeton University Press. ISBN 0-691-11436-6.

=== Rebellions/resistance ===
- Aptheker, Herbert (1945) [1943]. American Negro Slave Revolts. New York: Columbia University Press.
- —— (1966). Nat Turner's Slave Rebellion, Together with the Full Text of the So-called 'Confessions' of Nat Turner Made in Prison in 1831. New York: Humanities Press, Inc.
- Bell, Karen Cook (2021). Running from Bondage: Enslaved Women and Their Remarkable Fight for Freedom in Revolutionary America. New York: Cambridge University Press. ISBN 978-1-108-83154-3.
- Blight, David W. (2007). Slave No More: Two Men Who Escaped to Freedom: Including Their Own Narratives of Emancipation. Boston: Houghton Mifflin Harcourt. ISBN 978-0-15-101232-9.
- Boritt, Gabor S.; Hancock, Scott (2007). Slavery, Resistance, Freedom. New York: Oxford University Press. ISBN 978-0-19-538460-4.
- Bracey, John Jr.; Meier, August; Rudwick, Elliott, eds. (1971). American Slavery: The Question of Resistance. Belmont, CA: Wadsworth Publishing Company, Inc. ISBN 0-534-00017-7.
- Bynum, Victoria E. (2016) [2001]. The Free State of Jones: Mississippi's Longest Civil War. Chapel Hill, NC: The University of North Carolina Press. ISBN 978-1-4696-2705-2.
- Campbell, Stanley W. (1970) [1968]. The Slave Catchers: Enforcement of the Fugitive Slave Law, 1850-1860. Chapel Hill, NC: The University of North Carolina Press. ISBN 0-8078-1141-6.
- Clavin, Matthew J. (2019). The Battle of Negro Fort: The Rise and Fall of a Fugitive Slave Community. New York: New York University Press. ISBN 9781479811106.
- Daly, John Patrick (2002). When Slavery Was Called Freedom: Evangelicalism, Proslavery, and the Causes of the Civil War. Lexington, KY: University Press of Kentucky. ISBN 0-8131-2241-4.
- Davis, Thomas J. (1990). A Rumor of Revolt: The "Great Negro Plot" in Colonial New York. Amherst, MA: University of Massachusetts Press. ISBN 0-87023-725-X.
- Dunbar, Erica Armstrong (2017). Never Caught: The Washingtons' Relentless Pursuit of their Runaway Slave, Ona Judge. New York: 37 Ink/Atria. ISBN 978-1-5011-2639-0.
- Franklin, John Hope; Schweninger, Loren (1999). Runaway Slaves: Rebels on the Plantation. New York: Oxford University Press. ISBN 0-19-508451-9.
- Frey, Sylvia R. (1991). Water from the Rock: Black Resistance in a Revolutionary Age. Princeton, NJ: Princeton University Press. ISBN 0-691-04784-7.
- Genovese, Eugene D. (1979). From Rebellion to Revolution: African-American Slave Revolts in the Making of the New World. Baton Rouge, LA: Louisiana State University Press. ISBN 0-8071-0586-4.
- Hinks, Peter P. (1997). To Awaken My Afflicted Brethren: David Walker and the Problem of Antebellum Slave Resistance. University Park, PA: Pennsylvania State University Press. ISBN 0-271-01578-0.
- Hoffer, Peter Charles (2003). The Great New York Conspiracy of 1741: Slavery, Crime, and Colonial Law. Lawrence, KS: University Press of Kansas. ISBN 978-0-7006-1245-1.
- Johnson, Mat (2007). The Great Negro Plot: A Tale of Conspiracy and Murder in Eighteenth-Century New York. New York: Bloomsbury USA. ISBN 978-1-58234-099-9.
- Jones, Howard (1987). Mutiny on the Amistad: The Saga of a Slave Revolt and Its Impact on American Abolition, Law, and Diplomacy. New York: Oxford University Press. ISBN 0-19-503828-2. Basis for the film Amistad
- Jordan, Winthrop D. (1995) [1993]. Tumult and Silence at Second Creek: An Inquiry into a Civil War Slave Conspiracy. Baton Rouge, LA: Louisiana State University Press. ISBN 0-8071-2039-1. Bancroft Prize for American History, 1994
- Kly, Yussuf Naim, ed. (2006). The Invisible War: The African American Anti-Slavery Resistance from the Stono Rebellion through the Seminole Wars. Atlanta, GA: Clarity Press, Inc. ISBN 9780932863508.
- Maltz, Earl M. (2010). Fugitive Slave on Trial: The Anthony Burns Case and Abolitionist Outrage. Lawrence, KS: University Press of Kansas. ISBN 978-0-7006-1735-7.
- Mullin, Gerald W. (1972). Flight and Rebellion: Slave Resistance in Eighteenth-Century Virginia. New York: Oxford University Press. ISBN 0-19-501514-2.
- Oates, Stephen B. (1990) [1975]. The Fires of Jubilee: Nat Turner's Fierce Rebellion. New York: Harper Perennial. ISBN 0-06-013228-0.
- Pargas, Damian Alan, ed. (2018). Fugitive Slaves and Spaces of Freedom in North America. Gainesville, FL: University Press of Florida. ISBN 9780813056036.
- Price, Richard (1996) [1973]. Maroon Societies: Rebel Slave Communities in the Americas. Baltimore: Johns Hopkins University Press. ISBN 0-8018-5496-2.
- Rasmussen, Daniel (2011). American Uprising: The Untold Story of America's Largest Slave Revolt. New York: HarperCollins. ISBN 978-0-06-199521-7.
- Rediker, Marcus (2012). The Amistad Rebellion: An Atlantic Odyssey of Slavery and Freedom. New York: Viking. ISBN 978-0-670-02504-6.
- Rucker, Walter C. (2006). The River Flows On: Black Resistance, Culture, and Identity Formation in Early America. Baton Rouge, LA: Louisiana State University Press. ISBN 0-8071-3109-1.
- Sale, Maggie Montesinos (1997). The Slumbering Volcano: American Slave Ship Revolts and the Production of Rebellious Masculinity. Durham, NC: Duke University Press. ISBN 0-8223-1983-7.
- Sanborn, Franklin Benjamin (1900). John Brown and His Friends. Middebury, VT: Pamphlet from Abernethy Collection of American Literature, Middlebury College. JSTOR 28478314.
- Schama, Simon (2006). Rough Crossings: Britain, the Slaves and the American Revolution. New York: HarperCollins Publishers. ISBN 978-0-06-053916-0. National Book Critics Circle Award for Nonfiction, 2006
- Weisenburger, Steven (1998). Modern Medea: A Family Story of Slavery and Child-Murder from the Old South. New York: Hill and Wang. ISBN 0-8090-6953-9.
- Wood, Peter H. (1974). Black Majority: Negroes in Colonial South Carolina from 1670 through the Stono Rebellion. New York: W.W. Norton & Company, Inc. ISBN 0-393-31482-0.

=== Underground railroad ===
- Blight, David W., ed. (2004). Passages to Freedom: The Underground Railroad in History and Memory. Washington, DC: Smithsonian Books. ISBN 1-58834-157-7.
- Buckmaster, Henrietta (1969) [1941]. Let My People Go: The Story of the Underground Railroad and the Growth of the Abolition Movement. Boston: Beacon Press.
- Foner, Eric (2015). Gateway to Freedom: The Hidden History of the Underground Railroad. New York: W.W. Norton & Company, Inc. ISBN 978-0-393-35219-1.
- Hudson, J. Blaine (2006). Encyclopedia of the Underground Railroad. Jefferson, NC: McFarland & Co. ISBN 978-0-7864-2459-7.
- Pettit, Eber M. (1999) [1879]. Sketches in the History of the Underground Railroad. Westfield, NY: Chautauqua Region Press. ISBN 0-9658955-3-X.
- Siebert, Wilbur H. (1968) [1898]. The Underground Railroad from Slavery to Freedom. Gloucester, MA: Peter Smith.
- Smedley, R.C. (1883). History of the Underground Railroad in Chester and the Neighboring Counties of Pennsylvania. Lancaster, PA: Office of the Journal.
- Snodgrass, Mary Ellen (2008). The Underground Railroad: An Encyclopedia of People, Places, and Operations, Vol. 1. Armonk, NY: M.E. Sharpe. ISBN 978-0-7656-8093-8.
- Still, William (1872). The Underground Railroad: A Record of Facts, Authentic Narratives, Letters, etc. Philadelphia: Porter and Coates.
- Strother, Horatio T. (1962). The Underground Railroad in Connecticut. Middletown, CT: Wesleyan University Press.

=== Women ===
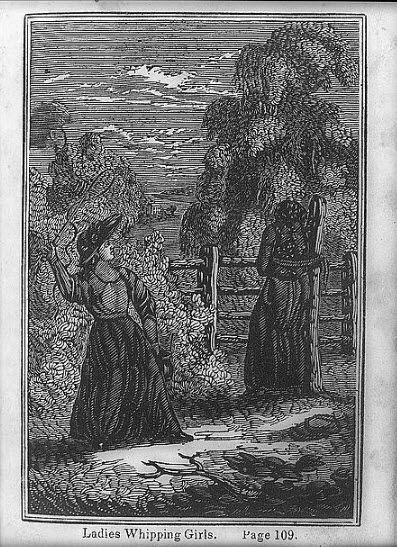
Woman whipping slave girl.

- Adams, Catherine; Pleck, Elizabeth (2010). Love of Freedom: Black Women in Colonial and Revolutionary New England. Oxford University Press. ISBN 978-0-19-538909-8.
- Braxton, Joanne, ed. (1989). Black Women Writing Autobiography: A Tradition within a Tradition. Philadelphia: Temple University Press. ISBN 0-87722-639-3.
- Bynum, Victoria E. (1992). Unruly Women: The Politics of Social and Sexual Control in the Old South. Chapel Hill, NC: The University of North Carolina Press. ISBN 0-8078-2016-4.
- Campbell, Gwyn; Elbourne, Elizabeth, eds. (2014). Sex, Power, and Slavery. Athens, OH: Ohio University Press. ISBN 978-0-8214-4490-0.
- Faust, Drew Gilpin, ed. (1996). Mothers of Invention: Women of the Slaveholding South in the American Civil War. Chapel Hill, NC: University of North Carolina Press. ISBN 0-8078-2255-8.
- Finley, Alexandra J. (2020). An Intimate Economy: Enslaved Women, Work, and America's Domestic Slave Trade. Chapel Hill, N.C.: University of North Carolina Press. ISBN 9781469655123. JSTOR 10.5149/9781469655130_finley.
- Foster, Thomas (2019). Rethinking Rufus: Sexual Violations of Enslaved Men. Athens, GA: University of Georgia Press. ISBN 978-0820355221.
- Fox-Genovese, Elizabeth (1988). Within the Plantation Household: Black and White Women of the Old South. Chapel Hill, NC: The University of North Carolina Press. ISBN 0-8078-1808-9.
- Frederickson, Mary E.; Walters, Delores M. (2013). Gendered Resistance: Women, Slavery, and the Legacy of Margaret Garner. Urbana, IL: University of Illinois Press. ISBN 978-0-252-03790-0.
- Gaspar, David Barry; Hine, Darlene Clark (1996). More Than Chattel: Black Women and Slavery in the Americas. Bloomington, IN: Indiana University Press. ISBN 0-253-33017-3.
- Hine, Darlene Clark; Thompson, Kathleen (1997). A Shining Thread of Hope: The History of Black Women in America. New York: Broadway Books. ISBN 0-7679-0110-X.
- Hodes, Martha (1997). White Women, Black Men: Illicit Sex in the Nineteenth-Century South. New Haven, CT: Yale University Press. ISBN 0-300-06970-7.
- Hunter, Tera W (1997). To 'Joy My Freedom: Southern Black Women's Lives and Labors after the Civil War. Cambridge, MA: Harvard University Press. ISBN 0-674-89309-3.
- Johnson, Jessica Marie (2020). Wicked Flesh: Black Women, Intimacy, and Freedom in the Atlantic World. Philadelphia, PA: University of Pennsylvania Press. ISBN 9780812252385.
- Jones, Jacqueline (2010) [1985]. Labor of Love, Labor of Sorrow: Black Women, Work, and the Family from Slavery to the Present. New York: Basic Books. ISBN 978-0-465-01881-9.
- Jones-Rogers, Stephanie E. (2019). They Were Her Property: White Women as Slave Owners in the American South. New Haven, Connecticut: Yale University Press. ISBN 978-0-300-21866-4.
- Lebsock, Susan (1985) [1984]. The Free Women of Petersburg: Status and Culture in a Southern Town, 1784-1860. New York: W.W. Norton & Company, Inc. ISBN 0-393-95264-9. Bancroft Prize for American History, 1985
- Lewis, Catherine M.; Lewis, J. Richard (2011). Women and Slavery in America: A Documentary History. Fayetteville, AR: University of Arkansas Press. ISBN 978-1-55728-957-5.
- Martin, Joan M. (2000). More Than Chains and Toil: A Christian Work Ethic of Enslaved Women. Louisville, KY: Westminster John Knox Press. ISBN 0-664-25800-X.
- Morton, Patricia, ed. (1996). Discovering the Women in Slavery: Emancipating Perspectives on the American Past. Athens, GA: University of Georgia Press. ISBN 0-8203-1756-X.
- Noble, Jeanne (1978). Beautiful, Also, Are the Souls of My Black Sisters: A History of the Black Woman in America. Englewood Cliffs, NJ: Prentice Hall. ISBN 0-13-066555-X.
- Nunley, Tamika Y. (2021). At the Threshold of Liberty: Women, Slavery, and Shifting Identities in Washington, D.C. Chapel Hill, NC: The University of North Carolina Press. ISBN 9781469662213.
- Patton, Venetria K. (2000). Women in Chains: The Legacy of Slavery in Black Women's Fiction. Albany, NY: State University of New York Press. ISBN 0-7914-4343-4.
- Pinto, Samantha (2020). Infamous Bodies: Early Black Women's Celebrity and the Afterlives of Rights. Durham, NC: Duke University Press. ISBN 9781478009283.
- Schafer, Judith K. (Spring 1987). ""Open and Notorious Concubinage": The Emancipation of Slave Mistresses by Will and the Supreme Court in Antebellum Louisiana". Louisiana History: The Journal of the Louisiana Historical Association. 28 (2): 165–182. ISSN 0024-6816.
- Scherer, Lester B. (1975). Slavery and the Churches in Early America, 1619-1819. Grand Rapids, MI: William B. Eerdmans Publishing Company. ISBN 0-8028-3458-2.
- Schwalm, Leslie (1997). A Hard Fight for We: Women's Transition from Slavery to Freedom in South Carolina'. Urbana, IL: University of Illinois Press. ISBN 0-252-02259-9.
- Smithers, Gregory D. (2012). Slave Breeding : Sex, Violence, and Memory in African American History. Gainesville, FL: University Press of Florida. ISBN 978-0-8130-4238-1.
- Sobel, Mechal (1979). Trabelin On: The Slave Journey to an Afro-Baptist Faith. Westport, CT: Greenwood Press. ISBN 0-8371-9887-9.
- Soderlund, Jean R. (1985). Quakers and Slavery: A Divided Spirit. Princeton, NJ: Princeton University Press. ISBN 0-691-04732-4.
- Sterling, Dorothy (1984). We Are Your Sisters: Black Women in the Nineteenth Century. New York: W.W. Norton & Company, Inc. ISBN 978-0-393-31629-2.
- Sublette, Ned; Sublette, Constance (2016). The American Slave Coast: A History of the Slave-Breeding Industry. Chicago: Chicago Review Press. ISBN 978-1-61374-820-6.
- Weiner, Marli Frances (1997). Mistresses and Slaves: Plantation Women in South Carolina, 1830-80. Urbana, IL: University of Illinois Press. ISBN 0-252-02322-6.
- White, Deborah Gray (1999). Ar'n't I a Woman?: Female Slaves in the Plantation South. New York: W.W. Norton & Company, Inc. ISBN 0-393-02217-X.
- Yellin, Jean Fagan (1994). The Abolitionist Sisterhood: Women's Political Culture in Antebellum America. Ithaca, NY: Cornell University Press. ISBN 0-8014-2728-2.

== Primary sources ==
- Benezet, Anthony; Wesley, John (1858). Views of American Slavery Taken a Century Ago. Philadelphia: Association of Friends for the Diffusion of Religious and Useful Knowledge.
- Birney, James Gillespie (1885) [1842]. The American Churches: The Bulwarks of American Slavery. Concord, NH: Parker Pillsbury.
- Bourne, George (1834). Picture of Slavery in the United States of America. Middletown, CT: Edwin Hunt.
- Brown, William Wells (1971) [1867]. The Negro in the American Rebellion. New York: The Citadel Press. ISBN 0-8065-0238-X.
- Cairnes, John Elliott (1863) [1862]. The Slave Power: Its Character, Career, and Probable Designs: Being an Attempt to Explain the Real Issues Involved in the American Contest. London: Macmillan and Co.
- Child, Lydia Maria (1996) [1833]. Karcher, Carolyn (ed.). An Appeal in Favor of That Class of Americans Called Africans. Amherst, MA: University of Massachusetts Press. ISBN 1-55849-006-X.
- Coffin, Joshua; Pinckney, Thomas (1970) [1822/1860]. Slave Insurrections: Selected Documents. Westport, CT: Negro Universities Press. ISBN 9780837117980.
- Crane, William (1865). Anti-Slavery in Virginia: Extracts from Thos. Jefferson, Gen. Washington and Others Relative to the 'Blighting Curse of Slavery'. Debates on the 'Nat Turner Insurrection'. Baltimore: J.F. Weishampel.
- Goodell, William (1968) [1853]. The American Slave Code in Theory and Practice. New York: Negro Universities Press.
- Leigh, Frances Butler (1969) [1883]. Ten Years on a Georgia Plantation since the War. New York: Negro Universities Press. ISBN 9780837111773.
- Lincoln, Abraham (2001). Johnson, Michael P. (ed.). Abraham Lincoln, Slavery, and the Civil War: Selected Writings and Speeches. Boston: Bedford/St. Martin's. ISBN 0-312-22763-9.
- Mathews, Edward (1853). The Shame and Glory of the American Baptists; or, Slaveholders versus Abolitionists (pamphlets). Bristol, England: Thomas Mathews. JSTOR 60221921.
- Miller, James, ed. (2001). The Complete History of American Slavery. San Diego, California: Greenhaven Press. ISBN 0737704241.
- Moore, George H. (1866). Notes on the History of Slavery in Massachusetts. New York: D. Appleton & Co.
- Rose, Willie Lee, ed. (1976). A Documentary History of Slavery in North America. New York: Oxford University Press. ISBN 0-19-501978-4.
- Ross, Alexander Milton (1972) [1876]. Recollections and Experiences of an Abolitionist from 1855 to 1865. Northbrook, IL: Metro Books, Inc. ISBN 9780841100749.
- Scott, Thomas Allan (1995). Cornerstones of Georgia History: Documents That Formed the State. Athens, GA: University of Georgia Press. ISBN 0-8203-1706-3.
- Shi, David Emory; Mayer, Holly A., eds. (2016) [1999]. For the Record: A Documentary History of America, Vol. 1: From First Contact through Reconstruction. New York: W.W. Norton & Company, Inc. ISBN 978-0-393-28303-7.
- ——; ——, eds. (2016) [1999]. For the Record: A Documentary History of America, Vol. 2: From Reconstruction through Contemporary Times. New York: W.W. Norton & Company, Inc. ISBN 978-0-393-28304-4.
- Stowe, Harriet Beecher (1853). A Key to Uncle Tom's Cabin. Boston: J. P. Jewett & Co. OL 21879838M.
- Torrey, Jesse Jr. (1971) [1822]. American Slave Trade: From Colonial Times to the Civil War. New York: Negro Universities Press. ISBN 9780837156668.
- Wedderburn, Robert (1991) [1802-1828]. McCalman, Iain (ed.). The Horrors of Slavery and Other Writings by Robert Wedderburn. Princeton, NJ: Markus Wiener Publishers. ISBN 1-55876-051-2.

=== Abolition/anti-slavery ===
- Bacon, Thomas (1813). Sermons Addressed to Masters and Servants, Published in the Year 1734. Winchester, VA: John Heiskell, Printer.
- Colman, Julia; Thompson, Matilda G. (1859). The Child's Anti-Slavery Book: Containing a Few Words about American Slave Children and Stories of Slave-Life. New York: Carlton & Porter.
- Crane, William (1865). Anti-Slavery in Virginia: Extracts from Thos. Jefferson, Gen. Washington and Others Relative to the 'Blighting Curse of Slavery'. Debates on the 'Nat Turner Insurrection'. Baltimore: J.F. Weishampel.
- Douglass, Frederick (1863). The Constitution of the United States: Is It Pro-Slavery or Anti-Slavery? (pamphlets). Halifax, West Yorkshire, England: T. and W. Birthwhistle, Printers. JSTOR 60227764.
- Drake, Charles E. (September 17, 1862). The War of Slavery upon the Constitution: Address of Charles E. Drake on the Anniversary of the Constitution Delivered in St. Louis. [St. Louis?.
- Goodell, William (1844). Views of American Constitutional Law in Its Bearing Upon American Slavery. Utica, NY: Jackson & Chaplin.
- —— (1968) [1853]. The American Slave Code in Theory and Practice. New York: Negro Universities Press.
- Hiller, Oliver Prescott (1860). A Chapter on Slavery: Presenting a Sketch of Its Origin and History, with the Reasons for Its Permission and the Probable Manner of Its Removal. London: Hudson & Son.
- Holley, Sallie (1899). Chadwick, John White (ed.). A Life for Liberty: Anti-Slavery and Other Letters of Sallie Holley. New York: G.P. Putnam’s Sons.
- Kenrick, John (1817). The Horrors of Slavery. Cambridge, MA: Hilliard and Metcalf.
- Mathews, Edward (1853). The Shame and Glory of the American Baptists; or, Slaveholders versus Abolitionists (pamphlets). Bristol, England: Thomas Mathews. JSTOR 60221921.
- O'Brien, James Bronterre (1885) [1842]. The Rise, Progress, and Phases of Human Slavery: How It Came into the World and How It Shall Be Made to Go Out. London: William Reeves.
- Phillips, Wendell (1968) [1863]. Speeches, Lectures, and Letters. New York: Negro Universities Press.
- Rankin, John (1833). Letters on American Slavery: Addressed to Mr. Thomas Rankin, Merchant at Middlebrook, Augusta County, Virginia. Boston: Garrison & Knapp.
- Richardson, Nathaniel Smith (1864). The Union, the Constitution, and Slavery. New York: American Bible Society.
- Ross, Alexander Milton (1972) [1876]. Recollections and Experiences of an Abolitionist from 1855 to 1865. Northbrook, IL: Metro Books, Inc. ISBN 9780841100749.
- Seebohm, Frederic (1865). The Crisis of Emancipation in America, Being a Review of the History of Emancipation, from the Beginning of the American War to the Assassination of President Lincoln. London: A.W. Bennett.
- Senior, Nassau William (1856). American Slavery. London: T. Fellowes.
- Smith, Gerrit (1844). Constitutional Argument Against American Slavery. Utica, NY: Jackson & Chaplin.
- Spooner, Lysander (1845). The Unconstitutionality of Slavery. Boston: Bella Marsh.
- Stewart, Alvan (1845). A Legal Argument Before the Supreme Court of the State of New Jersey, at the May Term, 1845, at Trenton, for the Deliverance of 4,000 Persons from Bondage. New York: Finch & Weed.
- Thomas, E. (1834). A Concise View of the Slavery of the People of Colour in the United States. Philadelphia: E. Thomas (self).
- Thurston, Richard Bowers; Baldwin, Abraham Chittenden; Williston, Timothy (1857). Three Prize Essays on American Slavery. Boston: Congregational Board of Publications.
- Torrey, Jesse Jr. (1970) [1817]. A Portraiture of Domestic Slavery in the United States... St. Clair Shores, MI: Scholarly Press. ISBN 9780403001842.
- Walker, David (1830). Walker's Appeal, in Four Articles. Boston: D. Walker.
- Weld, Theodore Dwight (1839). American Slavery As It Is: Testimony of a Thousand Witnesses. New York: American Anti-Slavery Society.

=== Biographies/narratives ===
- Andrews, William L.; Mason, Regina E., eds. (2008). Five Black Lives. New York: Oxford University Press. ISBN 978-0-19-534331-1.
- Andrews, William L. (2019). Slavery and Class in the American South: A Generation of Slave Narrative Testimony, 1840-1865. New York: Oxford University Press. ISBN 9780190908393.
- Aptheker, Herbert (1966). Nat Turner's Slave Rebellion, Together with the Full Text of the So-called 'Confessions' of Nat Turner Made in Prison in 1831. New York: Humanities Press, Inc.
- Ashton, Susanna (2010). I Belong to South Carolina: South Carolina Slave Narratives. Columbia, SC: University of South Carolina Press. ISBN 978-1-57003-900-3.
- Ball, Charles (1970) [1837]. Fifty Years in Chains (Slavery in the United States: A Narrative of the Life and Adventures of Charles Ball, a Black Man Who Lived Forty Years in Maryland, South Carolina and Georgia, as a Slave). Mineola, NY: Dover Publications. ISBN 0-486-43096-0.
- Barnwell, Marion, ed. (1997). A Place Called Mississippi: Collected Narratives. Jackson, MS: University Press of Mississippi. ISBN 0-87805-963-6.
- Bearse, Austin (1880). Reminiscences of Fugitive-Slave Law Days in Boston. Boston: Warren Richardson.
- Berlin, Ira; Favreau, Marc; Miller, Steven F., eds. (1998). Remembering Slavery: African Americans Talk About Their Personal Experiences of Slavery and Freedom. New York: The New Press. ISBN 9781595587633.
- Blassingame, John, ed. (1977). Slave Testimony: Two Centuries of Letters, Speeches, Interviews, and Autobiographies. Baton Rouge, LA: Louisiana State University Press. ISBN 0-8071-0184-2.
- Bontemps, Arna, ed. (1969). Great Slave Narratives. Boston: Beacon Press.
- Bontemps, Arna, ed. (1971). Five Black Lives: The Autobiographies of Venture Smith, James Mars, William Grimes, The Rev. G.W. Offley, James L. Smith. Middletown, CT: Wesleyan University Press. ISBN 0-8195-6190-8.
- Botkin, B.A., ed. (1945). Lay My Burden Down: A Folk History of Slavery. Chicago: University of Chicago Press.
- Brown, William Wells (2003) [1848]. From Fugitive Slave to Free Man: The Autobiographies of William Wells Brown. Columbia, MO: University of Missouri Press. ISBN 0-8262-1475-4.
- Canot, Théodore (2002) [1854]. Adventures of an African Slaver: Captain Theodore Canot. Mineola, NY: Dover Publications, Inc. ISBN 0-486-42512-6.
- Crew, Spencer R.; Bunch, Lonnie G. III; Price, Clement A., eds. (2015). Memories of the Enslaved: Voices from the Slave Narratives. Santa Barbara, CA: Praeger. ISBN 978-1-4408-3778-4.
- Davis, Charles T. (1985). The Slave's Narrative. New York: Oxford University Press. ISBN 0-19-503276-4.
- Douglass, Frederick (1988) [1845]. Bloom, Harold (ed.). Frederick Douglass's Narrative of the Life of Frederick Douglass. New York: Chelsea House. ISBN 1-55546-014-3.
- —— (1855). My Bondage and My Freedom. New York: Miller, Orton & Mulligan.
- Dresser, Amos (1836). Narrative of Amos Dresser: With Stone's letters from Natchez, an Obituary Notice of the Writer, and Two Letters from Tallahassee, Relating to the Treatment of Slaves. New York: American Anti-Slavery Society.
- Egypt, Ophelia S.; Masuoka, J.; Johnson, Charles S., eds. (1945). Unwritten History of Slavery: Autobiographical Accounts of Negro Ex-Slaves. Nashville, TN: Fisk University Press.
- Equiano, Olaudah (2001). Sollors, Werner (ed.). The Interesting Narrative of the Life of Olaudah Equiano, or Gustavus Vassa, the African. Written by Himself. New York: W.W. Norton & Company, Inc. ISBN 0-393-97494-4.
- Goings, Henry (2012). Schermerhorn, Calvin; Plunkett, Michael; Gaynor, Edward (eds.). Rambles of a Runaway from Southern Slavery. Carter G. Woodson Institute Series. Introduction by Calvin Schermerhorn. Charlottesville, Virginia: University of Virginia Press. ISBN 978-0-8139-3238-5. LCCN 2011036683. OCLC 752286963. Project MUSE book 14738.
- Gilbert, Olive (1853). Narrative of Sojourner Truth, a Northern Slave: Emancipated from Bodily Servitude by the State of New York in 1828. New York: Edward O. Jenkins.
- Holley, Sallie (1899). Chadwick, John White (ed.). A Life for Liberty: Anti-Slavery and Other Letters of Sallie Holley. New York: G.P. Putnam’s Sons.
- Jacobs, Harriet A.; Griffin, Farah Jasmine (2005) [1861]. Incidents in the Life of a Slave Girl: Written by Herself. Barnes & Noble Classics. ISBN 978-1-59308-283-3.
- Jones, Thomas (1880) [1850]. The Experience of Thomas Jones, Who Was a Slave for Forty-Three Years. Boston: A.T. Bliss & Co.
- Keckley, Elizabeth (1988) [1868]. Behind the Scenes: Thirty Years a Slave, and Four Years in the White House. New York: Oxford University Press. ISBN 0-19-505259-5.
- Kemble, Frances Anne (1863). Journal of a Residence on a Georgia Plantation in 1838–1839. New York: Harper & Brothers, Publishers.
- Lundy, Benjamin (1969) [1847]. The Life, Travels and Opinions of Benjamin Lundy. New York: Negro Universities Press. ISBN 9780837121796.
- Minges, Patrick, ed. (2006). Far More Terrible for Women: Personal Accounts of Women in Slavery. Winston-Salem, NC: John F. Blair, Publisher. ISBN 978-0-89587-323-1.
- Northup, Solomon (1859) [1853]. Twelve Years a Slave: Narrative of Solomon Northup, a Citizen of New York, Lidnapped in Washington City in 1841, and Rescued in 1853, from a Cotton Plantation near the Red River in Louisiana. New York: C.M. Saxton.
- Pickard, Kate E.R. (1968) [1856]. The Kidnapped and the Ransomed Being the Personal Recollections of Peter Still and His Wife Vina, after Forty Years of Slavery. New York: Negro Universities Press.
- Redpath, James (1996) [1859]. McKivigan, John B. (ed.). The Roving Editor, or, Talks with Slaves in the Southern States. University Park, PA: Pennsylvania State University Press.
- Smallwood, Thomas (2000) [1851]. A Narrative of Thomas Smallwood (Coloured Man). Toronto: Mercury Press. ISBN 1-55128-082-5. Credited with coining the term "Underground Railroad" a decade earlier
- Stepto, Robert B. (1979). From Behind the Veil: A Study of Afro-American Narrative. Urbana, IL: University of Illinois Press. ISBN 0-252-00752-2.
- Stewart, Maria W. (1987) [1831-1879]. Maria W. Stewart, America's First Black Woman Political Writer: Essays and Speeches. Bloomington, IN: Indiana University Press. ISBN 0-253-36342-X.
- Stone, Kate (1995) [1861-1868, 1955]. Brokenburn: The Journal of Kate Stone, 1861-1868. Baton Rouge, LA: Louisiana State University Press. ISBN 0-807 1-2042-1.
- Williams, James (1838). Narrative of James Williams, an American Slave, who was for several years a driver on a cotton plantation in Alabama. Boston: Isaac Knapp (for the American Anti-Slavery Society).
- Yetman, Norman R. (1970). Life under the "Peculiar Institution": Selections from the Slave Narrative Collection. New York: Holt, Rinehart, and Winston. ISBN 978-0-03-081424-2.

=== Proslavery ===
- —— (1861). The Sable Cloud: A Southern Tale, with Northern Comments. Boston: Ticknor and Fields.
- Colfax, Richard H. (1833). Evidence against the Views of the Abolitionists, Consisting of Physical and Moral Proofs, of the Natural Inferiority of the Negroes. New York: James T.M. Bleakley, Publisher.
- Drayton, William (1836). The South Vindicated from the Treason and Fanaticism of the Northern Abolitionists. Philadelphia: H. Manly.
- Elliott, E.N., ed. (1860). Cotton Is King, and Pro-Slavery Arguments: Comprising the Writings of Hammond, Harper, Christy, Stringfellow, Hodge, Bledsoe, and Cartwright, on This Important Subject. Augusta, GA: Pritchard, Abbott & Loomis.
- Fitzhugh, George (1854). Sociology for the South: Or, the Failure of Free Society. Richmond, VA: A. Morris, Publishers.
- Harper, William; Hammond, James H.; Simms, William Gilmore; Dew, Thomas Roderick (1852). The Pro-Slavery Argument; As Maintained by the Most Distinguished Writers of the Southern States. Charleston, SC: Walker, Richards & Co.
- Kingsley, Zephaniah (2000) [1828]. Stowell, Daniel W. (ed.). Balancing Evils Judiciously: The Proslavery Writings of Zephaniah Kingsley. Gainesville, FL: University Press of Florida. ISBN 9780813021171.
- Sleigh, William Willcocks (1838). Abolitionism exposed! Proving that the principles of abolitionism are injurious to the slaves themselves, destructive to this nation, and contrary to the express commands of God... Philadelphia: D. Schneck.

== For younger readers ==
- Aliki (1965). A Weed Is a Flower: The Life of George W. Carver. Englewood Cliffs, NJ: Prentice-Hall, Inc.
- Altman, Linda Jacobs (2004). The Politics of Slavery: Fiery National Debates Fueled by the Slave Economy. Berkeley Heights, NJ: Enslow Publishers, Inc. ISBN 0-7660-2154-8.
- Armentrout, David; Armentrout, Patricia (2004). The Emancipation Proclamation. Vero Beach, FL: Rourke Publishing LLC. ISBN 1-59515-233-4.
- Aronson, Marc (2010). Sugar Changed the World: A Story of Magic, Spice, Slavery, Freedom, and Science. Boston: Clarion Books. ISBN 978-0-618-57492-6.
- Best, B.J. (2016). Abraham Lincoln, the Emancipation Proclamation, and the Thirteenth Amendment. New York: Cavendish Square Publishing. ISBN 978-1-50260-530-6.
- Bontemps, Arna (1958). Story of the Negro. New York: Alfred A. Knopf, Inc.
- Bowen, David (1965). Struggle Within: Race Relations in the United States. New York: W.W. Norton & Company, Inc.
- Burchard, Peter (1999). Lincoln and Slavery. New York: Atheneum Books for Young Readers. ISBN 0-689-81570-0.
- Chambers, Bradford, ed. (1968). Chronicles of Negro Protest: A Background Book for Young People Documenting the History of Black Power. New York: Parents' Magazine Press.
- Colman, Julia; Thompson, Matilda G. (1859). The Child's Anti-Slavery Book: Containing a Few Words about American Slave Children and Stories of Slave-Life. New York: Carlton & Porter.
- Currie, Stephen (2003). Escapes from Slavery. San Diego, CA: Lucent Books. ISBN 1-59018-276-6.
- Davis, Kenneth C. (2016). In the Shadow of Liberty: The Hidden History of Slavery, Four Presidents, and Five Black Lives. New York: Henry Holt and Company. ISBN 9781627793117.
- DeFord, Deborah H. (2006). Life under Slavery. Philadelphia: Chelsea House. ISBN 0-8160-6135-1.
- Eskridge, Ann E. (2004). Slave Uprisings and Runaways: Fighting for Freedom and the Underground Railroad. Berkeley Heights, NJ: Enslow Publishers, Inc. ISBN 0-7660-2154-8.
- Garrison, Mary (2002). Slaves Who Dared: The Stories of Ten African-American Heroes. Shippensburg, PA: White Mane Kids. ISBN 1-57249-272-4.
- Goodman, Walter (1969). Black Bondage: The Life of Slaves in the South. New York: Farrar, Straus & Giroux.
- Gorrell, Gena K. (1996). North Star to Freedom: The Story of the Underground Railroad. Toronto, ONT: Stoddart Publishing Co. Limited.
- Gresko, Jessica A. (2007). Slave Rebellions. Detroit: Lucent Books. ISBN 9781590185483.
- Hamilton, Virginia (1993). Many Thousand Gone: African Americans from Slavery to Freedom. New York: Alfred A. Knopf. ISBN 0-394-92873-3.
- Hermann, Spring (2010). The Struggle for Freedom, 1770 to 1870. London: Heinemann Library. ISBN 978-0-431194-03-5.
- Hughes, Langston (1954). Famous American Negroes. New York: Dodd, Mead & Company.
- —— (1958). Famous Negro Heroes of America. New York: Dodd, Mead & Company.
- Ingraham, Leonard W. (1968). Slavery in the United States. New York: Franklin Watts, Inc. ISBN 978-0-531-00630-6.
- Isaacs, Sally Senzell (2001). Life on a Southern Plantation. Chicago: Heinemann Library. ISBN 1-57572-316-6.
- Jordan, Anne Devereaux; Schomp, Virginia (2007). Slavery and Resistance. New York: Marshall Cavendish Benchmark. ISBN 978-0-7614-2178-8.
- Kleinman, Joseph; Kurtis-Kleinman, Eileen (2001). Life on an African Slave Ship. San Diego, CA: Lucent Books. ISBN 1-56006-653-9.
- Landon, Elaine (2001). Slave Narratives: The Journey to Freedom. New York: Franklin Watts, Inc. ISBN 9780531117439.
- Lester, Julius; Feelings, Tom (1986) [1968]. To Be a Slave. New York: Scholastic Inc. ISBN 0-590-42460-2.
- Lewis, Cicely (2022). Resistance to Slavery: From Escape to Everyday Rebellion. Minneapolis, MN: Lerner Publications. ISBN 9781728439068.
- Liston, Robert A. (1972). Slavery in America: The Heritage of Slavery. New York: McGraw-Hill Book Company.
- Littlejohn, Randy (2004). A Timeline of the Slave Trade in America. New York: Rosen Publishing Group. ISBN 0-8239-4540-5.
- McGovern, Ann (1965). Runaway Slave: The Story of Harriet Tubman. New York: The Four Winds Press.
- McKissack, Pat (1987). Frederick Douglass: The Black Lion. Chicago: Childrens Press. ISBN 0-516-03221-6.
- McLaurin, Melton Alonza (1991). Celia, A Slave. Athens, GA: University of Georgia Press. ISBN 0-8203-1352-1.
- McNeese, Tim (2004). The Rise and Fall of American Slavery: Freedom Denied, Freedom Gained. Berkeley Heights, NJ: Enslow Publishers, Inc. ISBN 0-7660-2156-4.
- Millender, Dharathula H. (1965). Crispus Attucks, Boy of Valor. Indianapolis, IN: Bobbs-Merrill.
- Owen, Robert Dale (1864). The Wrong of Slavery, the Right of Emancipation, and the Future of the African Race in the United States. Philadelphia: J.R. Lippincott & Co.
- Patterson, Lillie (1991) [1962]. Booker T. Washington: Leader of His People. New York: Chelsea Juniors. ISBN 0-7910-1427-4.
- —— (1991). Frederick Douglass: Freedom Fighter. New York: Chelsea Juniors. ISBN 9780791014103.
- Pine, Tillie S.; Levine, Joseph (1967). The Africans Knew. New York: McGraw-Hill Book Company.
- Schleichert, Elizabeth (1998). The Thirteenth Amendment: Ending Slavery. Berkeley Heights, NJ: Enslow Publishers, Inc. ISBN 0-89490-897-9.
- Shorto, Russell (1991). Abraham Lincoln and the End of Slavery. Brookfield, CT: Millbrook Press. ISBN 1-878841-12-2.
- Strangis, Joel (1999). Lewis Hayden and the War Against Slavery. New Haven, CT: Linnet Books. ISBN 0-208-02430-1.
- Tapper, Suzanne Cloud (2017). Views on Slavery: In the Words of Enslaved Africans, Merchants, Owners, and Abolitionists. New York, NY: Enslow Publishing. ISBN 978-0-7660-7553-5.
- Taylor, Yuval; Judge, Kathleen, eds. (2005). Growing Up in Slavery: Stories of Young Slaves as Told by Themselves. Chicago: Lawrence Hill Books. ISBN 978-1-55652-635-0.
- Tomek, Beverly C. (2014). Pennsylvania Hall: A "Legal Lynching" in the Shadow of the Liberty Bell. New York: Oxford University Press. ISBN 978-0-19-983760-1.
- Woog, Adam (2009). The Emancipation Proclamation: Ending Slavery in America. New York: Chelsea House Publishers. ISBN 978-1-60413-307-3.
