= Thomas Borstelmann =

American historian (born 1958)

- Born: April 4, 1958 (age 68)

Academic background
- Education: Stanford University (B.A.); Duke University (M.A., Ph.D.)

Thomas ("Tim") Borstelmann (born April 4, 1958) is an American historian. He was the Elwood N. and Katherine Thompson Distinguished Professor of History at the University of Nebraska–Lincoln from 2003 until his retirement in 2025.

== Life ==
He was born on April 4, 1958. He graduated from the Phillips Exeter Academy. He completed his B.A. degree from Stanford University. He completed his M.A. and Ph.D. from Duke University. He taught at Cornell University from 1991 to 2003. He served as President of the Society for Historians of American Foreign Relations (SHAFR) in 2015.

== Bibliography ==
- The Cold War and the Color Line: American Race Relations in the Global Arena
- The 1970s: A New Global History from Civil Rights to Economic Inequality
- Apartheid's Reluctant Uncle: The United States and Southern Africa in the Early Cold War
- Created Equal: A History of the United States
- Just Like Us: The American Struggle to Understand Foreigners
