= Patrick Minges =

American historian

Patrick Neal Minges (35), is an American author and historian specializing in the cultural interactions among Native Americans and Africans. With several books to his credit, he continues to write and teach.

== Education ==
Minges graduated from East Carolina University with a master's in Counseling. He then earned a M.Div and Ph.D. at the Union Theological Seminary.

== Writing career ==
Minges is the author of several books, most of which deal with the various Native American tribes of North America, their long histories and their rich cultures.

== Books ==
- Slavery in the Cherokee Nation: The Keetoowah Society and the Defining of a People 1855-1867 (2003)
- Black Indian Slave Narratives (2004)
- Far More Terrible for Women: Personal Accounts of Women in Slavery (2006)
