= Audrey Smedley =

American anthropologist (1930–2020)

- Born: 1930; Detroit, Michigan
- Died: October 14, 2020 (aged 89–90); Beltsville, Maryland
- Education: University of Michigan (BA, MA); University of Manchester (PhD)
- Occupation: Anthropologist

Audrey Smedley (1930 – October 14, 2020) was an American social anthropologist and professor emeritus at Virginia Commonwealth University in anthropology and African-American studies.

== Early life and education ==
Smedley received her B.A. and M.A. in history and anthropology from the University of Michigan, and a Ph.D. in social anthropology from the University of Manchester in the UK, based on field research in northern Nigeria. She taught undergraduate and graduate-level courses in social anthropology, African societies and cultures, the history of anthropology, and anthropological theory.

== Career ==
Smedley wrote on the history of anthropology and the origin and evolution of the idea of human races since the late 1970s. Her research interests also included comparative slavery, human ecological adaptation, and the roles of women in patrilineal societies.
