= Russell Duncan (professor) =

Author

Russell Duncan is a history professor in Denmark. He has written books about American history including the Reconstruction era. He was interviewed for the American Experience program. He has written entries for the New Georgia Encyclopedia.

He has given presentations on various American political subjects both historical and contemporary.

In 2021, Malcolm-Jamal Warner acquired the film rights to his book Freedom Shore about Tunis Campbell and other freedmen in Georgia. Warner planned to produce and star in the production.

== Writings ==
- Where Death and Glory Meet
- Contemporary America: An Age of Anger and Resistance (2018)
- Journal of Archibald C. McKinley
- Transnational America
- Freedom's Shore; Tunis Campbell and the Georgia Freedmen
- First Person Past: American Autobiographies
- Entrepreneur for Equality: Governor Rufus Bullock, Commerce, and Race in Post-Civil War Georgia
- Where death and glory meet : Colonel Robert Gould Shaw and the 54th Massachusetts Infantry (1999)
- The Complete Civil War Writings of Ambrose Pierce, co-editor
