= Théodore Canot =

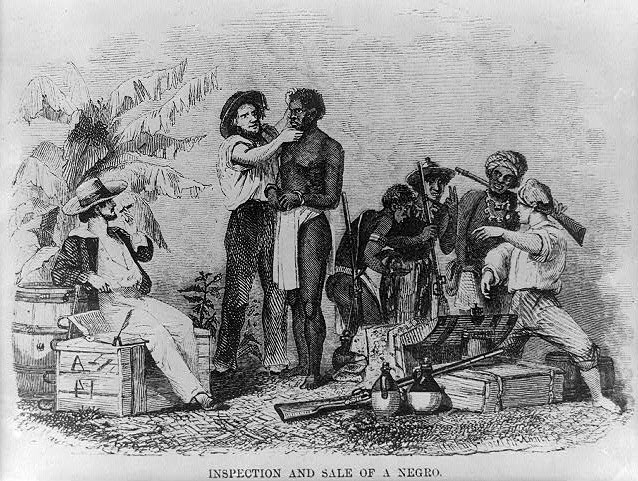
- African man being inspected prior to sale into slavery. Also present are African slave traders who are presumably selling the man to white traders
- Born: 1804
- Died: 1860 (aged 55–56)
- Occupation(s): writer, slave trader

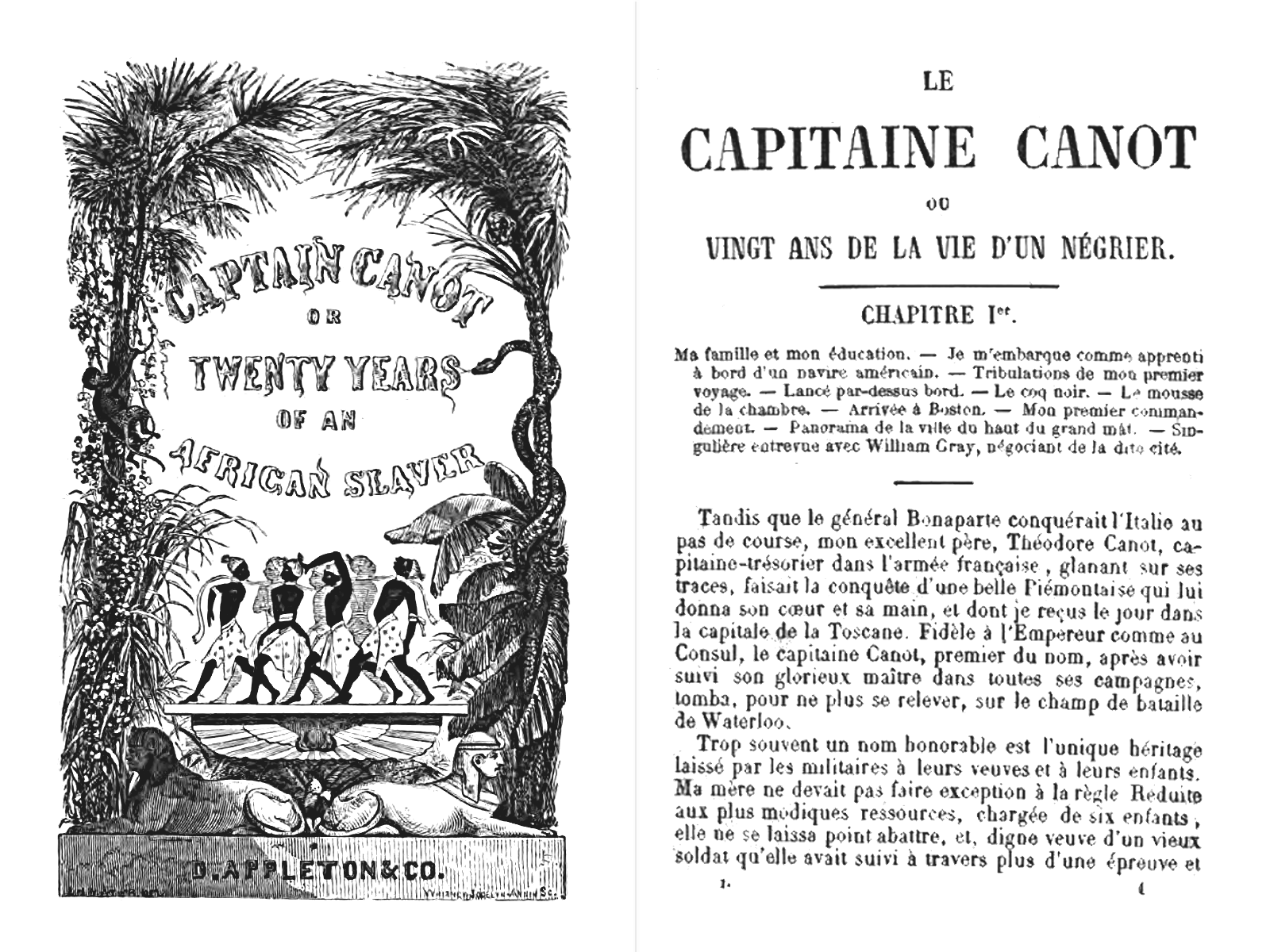
Captain Canot, Twenty Years of the Life of a Slaveman (1854)

Théodore Canot (1804–1860) was a slave trader and writer of Franco-Florentine origin.

Living in Florence, he embarked in 1819 in Livorno for America never to return. From 1820 to 1840, with a talent for language practice and for commerce, he became one of the most important slave traders active between Cuba and the coasts of Guinea, Liberia and Sierra Leone.

First embarking on merchant ships, he was quickly confronted with piracy which developed after the end of the slave trade by the nations in the Antilles. He then moved to the coast region of Guinea, at the mouth of the Rio Pongo, as an employee and quickly as a trusted man and then on his own. He also made numerous journeys of convoys of cargoes of slaves to Cuba, thus recounting his races with British "cruisers," the rebellions of slaves, mutinies, shipwrecks.

Around 1840, he abandoned the slave trade to become a plantation operator in the same region. He still occasionally engaged in slave trafficking. In 1854, he wrote an account of his eventful life. It offers an interesting testimony to the slave society of the time, both Europeans and African tribes who integrated this trade into their lifestyles.

== Bibliography ==
- Canot, Théodore. Les aventures d'un négrier, 1820-1840, Éditions l'Ancre de Marine, 2008, ISBN 978-2-84141-220-4
- Capitaine Canot (pseud. Théophile Conneau) Twenty years of the life of a slave trader Amyot, Paris 1854
