= Bibliography of Abraham Lincoln =

This bibliography of Abraham Lincoln is a comprehensive list of written and published works about or by Abraham Lincoln, the 16th president of the United States. In terms of modern sources containing Lincoln's letters and writings, scholars rely on The Collected Works of Abraham Lincoln, edited by Roy Basler, and others. It only includes writings by Lincoln, and omits incoming correspondence. In the six decades since Basler completed his work, some new documents written by Lincoln have been discovered. Previously, a project was underway at the Papers of Abraham Lincoln to provide "a freely accessible comprehensive electronic edition of documents written by and to Abraham Lincoln". The Papers of Abraham Lincoln completed Series I of their project The Law Practice of Abraham Lincoln in 2000. They electronically launched The Law Practice of Abraham Lincoln, Second Edition in 2009, and published a selective print edition of this series. Attempts are still being made to transcribe documents for Series II (non-legal, pre-presidential materials) and Series III (presidential materials).

Sixteen thousand books and articles have been published on Lincoln—125 on the assassination alone—more than any on other American. This listing is therefore highly selective and is based on reviews in the scholarly journals and recommended readings compiled by scholars.

== Bibliography ==
=== Biographies ===
- Beveridge, Albert J. Abraham Lincoln: 1809–1858 (1928). 2 vols. to 1858; notable for strong, political coverage that tends to favor Stephen Douglas online edition
- Burlingame, Michael. Abraham Lincoln: A Life (2 vols. 2008); the most detailed life. Manuscript. One-volume edition edited and abridged by Jonathan W. White (2023).
- Burlingame, Michael. The Inner World of Abraham Lincoln (1994). Urbana: University of Illinois Press.
- Carpenter, Francis Bicknell (1866). Six Months at the White House with Abraham Lincoln: The Story of a Picture, New York: Hurd and Houghton (1866); also published as The Inner Life of Abraham Lincoln: Six Months at the White House, New York: Hurd and Houghton (1867). Author was the artist who painted First Reading of the Emancipation Proclamation of President Lincoln.
- Carwardine, Richard. Lincoln: A Life of Purpose and Power (2003), winner of the Lincoln Prize
- Lord Charnwood, Abraham Lincoln (1916), first bio by a non-American, Excerpt

External videos
- Booknotes interview with David Herbert Donald on Lincoln, December 24, 1995, C-SPAN

- Donald, David Herbert. Lincoln (1995). Excerpt
- Freehling, William W. (2018). Becoming Lincoln. University of Virginia Press. ISBN 978-0813941578.
- Gienapp, William E. Abraham Lincoln and Civil War America: A Biography (2002). online edition
- Goodwin, Doris Kearns. Team of Rivals: The Political Genius of Abraham Lincoln (2005), winner of the Lincoln Prize, basis for the 2012 film Lincoln.

External videos
- Booknotes interview with Allen Guelzo on Abraham Lincoln: Redeemer President, April 16, 2000, C-SPAN

- Guelzo, Allen C. Abraham Lincoln: Redeemer President (1999) online edition Second edition, 2022.
- Guelzo, Allen C. (2009). Lincoln: A Very Short Introduction. Oxford University Press. ISBN 978-0-195367805.
- Harris, William C. Lincoln's Rise to the Presidency (2007) conservative author argues Lincoln was basically conservative Excerpt
- Herndon, William Henry; Weik, Jesse William; White, Horace (1920). Abraham Lincoln: The True Story of a Great Life, Vol. I. New York; London: D. Appleton and Co.
- Holland, Josiah Gilbert (1866). Holland's Life of Abraham Lincoln. Springfield, Massachusetts: Gurdon Bill. Published in 1998 with introduction by Allen C. Guelzo. Lincoln, Nebraska, and London, UK: University of Nebraska Press.
- Luthin, Reinhard H. (1944). The First Lincoln Campaign. Harvard University Press. ISBN 978-0844612928.
- Luthin, Reinhard H. The Real Abraham Lincoln (1960), emphasis on politics
- McKirdy, Charles Robert (2011). Lincoln Apostate: The Matson Slave Case. Univ. Press of Mississippi. ISBN 978-1604739879.
- McPherson, James M. Abraham Lincoln (2009) Short biography, Excerpt
- Meacham, Jon (2022). And There Was Light: Abraham Lincoln and the American Struggle. Random House. ISBN 978-0553393965.
- Miller, Richard Lawrence (2011). Lincoln and His World: The Rise to National Prominence, 1843–1853. McFarland. ISBN 978-0786459285., vol 3. of detailed biography
- Miller, William Lee. Lincoln's Virtues: An Ethical Biography (2002). New York: Alfred A. Knopf. ISBN 037540158X
- Miller, William Lee. President Lincoln: The Duty of a Statesman (2008). New York: Alfred A. Knopf. ISBN 978-1400041039
- Morse, John Torrey (1893). Abraham Lincoln. Vol. I. Cambridge, Mass., Riverside Press.
- Morse, John Torrey (1893). Abraham Lincoln. Vol. II. Cambridge, Mass., Riverside Press.
- Neely, Mark E. (1993). The Last Best Hope of Earth: Abraham Lincoln and the Promise of America. Harvard University Press. ISBN 978-0674511255.
- Neely, Mark E. (1984). The Abraham Lincoln Encyclopedia. Da Capo Press. ISBN 978-0306802096. detailed articles on many men and movements associated with Lincoln.

External videos
- Booknotes interview with Mark Neely on The Last Best Hope of Earth, June 12, 1994, C-SPAN

- Nevins, Allan (1950). The Emergence of Lincoln: Prologue to Civil War, 1859–1861. Scribner. ISBN 978-0684104164.
- Nicolay, Helen (1913). Personal Traits of Abraham Lincoln, New York: The Century Co. (based on material that the author's father John George Nicolay had collected but been unable to use in the biography of Lincoln that he wrote with John Hay)
- Nicolay, John George and John Hay. Abraham Lincoln: A History (1890); online at Volume 1 and Volume 2 vol 6 10 volumes in all; highly detailed narrative of era written by Lincoln's top aides
- Nichols, David A. (2010). Etulain, Richard W. (ed.). Lincoln Looks West: From the Mississippi to the Pacific. SIU Press. ISBN 978-0809385584.
- Oates, Stephen B. (1977). With Malice Toward None: The Life of Abraham Lincoln. Excerpt
- Randall, James G. Lincoln the President (4 vols., 1945–55; reprint 2000). Fourth volume: Randall, J. G. and Current, Richard N., Lincoln the President: Last Full Measure, New York: Dodd, Mead & Company (1955). Randall died in 1953 and Current completed the book.
- Reynolds, David S. (2020). Abe: Abraham Lincoln in His Times. Penguin Press. ISBN 978-1594206047
- Sandburg, Carl. Abraham Lincoln: The Prairie Years (2 vols. 1926) vol. 1 online (Subscription required.) vol. 2 online (Subscription required.); The War Years (4 vol 1939). Pulitzer Prize–winning biography by the famous poet
- Smith, Harvey H. (1931). Lincoln and the Lincolns. Pioneer Publications, Inc.
- Striner, Richard (2020). Summoned to Glory: The Audacious Life of Abraham Lincoln. Rowman & Littlefield Publishers. ISBN 978-1538137161
- Tarbell, Ida. The Life of Abraham Lincoln
- Thomas, Benjamin P. Abraham Lincoln: A Biography (1952; published with a new foreword by Michael Burlingame in 2008) online edition
- White Jr., Ronald C. (2009). A. Lincoln: A Biography. Random House, Inc. ISBN 978-1400064991.
- White, Ronald C. (2021). Lincoln in Private: What His Most Personal Reflections Tell Us About Our Greatest President. Random House. ISBN 978-1984855091

=== Specialty topics ===
- Achorn, Edward. Every Drop of Blood: The Momentous Second Inauguration of Abraham Lincoln (2020)
- Achorn, Edward. The Lincoln Miracle: Inside the Republican Convention that Changed History (2023) (on the 1860 convention)
- Adams, Charles Francis (April 1912). "The Trent Affair". The American Historical Review. 17 (3): 540–562. doi:10.2307/1834388. JSTOR 1834388. Published as a book titled The Trent Affair: An Historical Retrospective, with "A few changes in language ... and a paragraph added." Boston, 1912
- Angle, Paul M., Here I Have Lived: A History of Lincoln's Springfield, 1821–1865, (1935) online edition
- Belz, Herman. Abraham Lincoln, Constitutionalism, and Equal Rights in the Civil War Era (1998)
- Boritt, Gabor S. Lincoln and the Economics of the American Dream (1994). Lincoln's economic theory and policies
- Boritt, Gabor S. (1997). Why the Civil War Came. Oxford University Press. ISBN 978-0195113761.
- Boritt, Gabor S., ed. Lincoln the War President (1994)
- Bruce, Robert V. Lincoln and the Tools of War (1956) on weapons development during the war online edition
- Bush, Bryan S. Lincoln and the Speeds: The Untold Story of a Devoted and Enduring Friendship (2008) ISBN 978-0979880261
- Chittenden, Lucius E. Recollections of President Lincoln and His Administration, (1891). – Google Books
- Cox, LaWanda (1981). Lincoln and Black Freedom: A Study in Presidential Leadership. University of South Carolina Press. ISBN 978-0872494008.
- Donald, David Herbert. Lincoln Reconsidered: Essays on the Civil War Era (1960)
- Donald, David Herbert (2013). Lincoln's Herndon. Read Books Ltd. ISBN 978-1447487890.
- Donald, David Herbert. We Are Lincoln Men: Abraham Lincoln and His Friends Simon & Schuster, (2003).
- Earle, Jonathan (2026). He Has the People: Abraham Lincoln and the Election of 1860. New York: Oxford University Press.
- Emerson, James (2007). The Madness of Mary Lincoln. Southern Illinois University Press. ISBN 978-0809327713.
- Foner, Eric. The Fiery Trial: Abraham Lincoln and American Slavery (2011); Pulitzer Prize excerpt and text search
- Foner, Philip S. (1944). Abraham Lincoln: Selections from His Writings. International Publishers.
- Gerleman, David J. Representative Lincoln at Work: Reconstructing a Legislative Career from Original Archival Documents (2017) Lincoln's congressional career The Capitol Dome - 2017 Dome 54.2
- Green, Michael S. (2011). Lincoln and the Election of 1860. SIU Press. ISBN 978-0809330355.
- Guelzo, Allen C. Lincoln's Emancipation Proclamation: The End of Slavery in America, Simon & Schuster (2004). ISBN 0743221826
- Guelzo, Allen C. Lincoln and Douglas: The Debates that Defined America, Simon & Schuster (2008). ISBN 978-0743273206
- Hall, Roger Lee (2009). Lincoln and Liberty: Music from Abraham Lincoln's Era. PineTree Press.
- Harris, William C. With Charity for All: Lincoln and the Restoration of the Union (1997). AL's plans for Reconstruction
- Hendrick, Burton J. Lincoln's War Cabinet (1946) online edition
- Hofstadter, Richard. The American Political Tradition: And the Men Who Made It (1948) ch. 5: "Abraham Lincoln and the Self-Made Myth."
- Howe, Daniel Walker. Why Abraham Lincoln Was a Whig. Journal of the Abraham Lincoln Association 16.1 (1995)
- Lea, James Henry (1909). The Ancestry of Abraham Lincoln. Houghton Mifflin. p. 160. "swanton morley lincoln norfolk."
- Kashatus, William C. Abraham Lincoln, the Quakers and the Civil War: A Trial of Principle and Faith. Praeger, 2014. ISBN 978-1440833199.
- Kent, David (2026). Lincoln in New England: In Search of His Forgotten Tours. Globe Pequot. ISBN 978-1493092222.
- Kunhardt Jr., Phillip B., Kunhardt III, Phillip, and Kunhardt, Peter W. Lincoln: An Illustrated Biography. Gramercy Books, New York, 1992. ISBN 051720715X
- Laxner, James, Staking Claims to a Continent: John A. Macdonald, Abraham Lincoln, Jefferson Davis, and the Making of North America (2016). Anansi Press ISBN 978-1770894303
- Lind, Michael. What Lincoln Believed. The Values and Convictions of America's Greatest President (2004). Anchor Books, a division of Random House, Inc. New York ISBN 978-1400030736
- McGinty, Brian. The Body of John Merryman: Abraham Lincoln and the Suspension of Habeas Corpus. Harvard University Press, 2011.
- McGinty, Brian. Lincoln and the Court. Harvard University Press, 2008.
- McGinty, Brian. Lincoln and California: The President, the War, and the Golden State. Potomac Books, 2023.
- McPherson, James M. Battle Cry of Freedom: The Civil War Era (1988). Pulitzer Prize-winning book surveys all aspects of the war
- McPherson, James M. (2008). Tried by War: Abraham Lincoln as Commander in Chief. Penguin Press. ISBN 978-1594201912.
- Neely, Mark E. The Fate of Liberty: Abraham Lincoln and Civil Liberties (1992). Pulitzer Prize winner. online version
- Neely, Mark E. Lincoln and the Triumph of the Nation: Constitutional Conflict and the American Civil War (2011)
- Oakes, James. The Radical and the Republican: Frederick Douglass, Abraham Lincoln, and the Triumph of Antislavery Politics. New York: W.W. Norton & Company, Inc. 2007. ISBN 0393061949. review
- Ostendorf, Lloyd, and Hamilton, Charles. Lincoln in Photographs: An Album of Every Known Pose, Morningside House Inc., 1963, ISBN 0890290873.
- Paludan, Phillip S. The Presidency of Abraham Lincoln (1994), thorough treatment of Lincoln's administration
- Peraino, Kevin (2014). Lincoln in the World: The Making of a Statesman and the Dawn of American Power. Crown/Archetype. ISBN 978-0307887214.
- Pinsker, Matthew. Boss Lincoln: The Partisan Life of Abraham Lincoln. New York: W. W. Norton & Company. Review by Harold Holzer
- Polsky, Andrew J. "'Mr. Lincoln's Army' Revisited: Partisanship, Institutional Position, and Union Army Command, 1861–1865." Studies in American Political Development (2002), 16: 176–207
- Prokopowicz, Gerald J. (2008). Did Lincoln Own Slaves?. Vintage Books. ISBN 978-0307279293.
- Randall, James G. Lincoln the Liberal Statesman (1947)
- Randall, James G. (1945–1955). Lincoln the President (4 volumes). Dodd, Mead. OCLC 4183070.
- Richardson, Heather Cox. The Greatest Nation of the Earth: Republican Economic Policies during the Civil War (1997)
- Schroeder-Lein, Glenna R. Lincoln and Medicine. Carbondale and Edwardsville, Illinois: Southern Illinois University Press, 2012. (Concise Lincoln Library)
- Scott, Kenneth (September 1948). "Press Opposition to Lincoln in New Hampshire". The New England Quarterly. 21 (3): 326–341. doi:10.2307/361094. JSTOR 361094.
- Shenk, Joshua Wolf. Lincoln's Melancholy: How Depression Challenged a President and Fueled His Greatness (2005)
- Tagg, Larry (2009). The Unpopular Mr. Lincoln: The Story of America's Most Reviled President. Savas Beatie. ISBN 978-1932714616., a survey of contemporary criticism and polemic directed at Lincoln
- White, Jonathan W. Abraham Lincoln and Treason in the Civil War: The Trials of John Merryman (2011). review
- White, Jonathan W. Emancipation, the Union Army, and the Reelection of Abraham Lincoln (2014)
- White, Jonathan W. Lincoln on Law, Leadership, and Life (2015). review
- White, Jonathan W. My Day with Abe Lincoln (2024) Children's book based on facts of Lincoln's childhood.
- Williams, Kenneth P. (1985). Lincoln Finds a General: A Military Study of the Civil War. Vol. 1. New York: Macmillan Press.
- —— (1949). Lincoln Finds a General: A Military Study of the Civil War. Vol. 2. New York: Macmillan Press.
- —— (1949). Lincoln Finds a General: A Military Study of the Civil War. Vol. 3. New York: Macmillan Press.
- —— (1985). Lincoln Finds a General: A Military Study of the Civil War. Vol. 4. New York: Macmillan Press.
- —— (1949). Lincoln Finds a General: A Military Study of the Civil War. Vol. 5. New York: Macmillan Press.
- Williams, T. Harry. Lincoln and His Generals (1967).
- Wilson, Douglas L. Lincoln's Sword: The Presidency and the Power of Words (2006) ISBN 1400040396.

=== Historiography and memory ===
- Barr, John M. "Holding Up a Flawed Mirror to the American Soul: Abraham Lincoln in the Writings of Lerone Bennett Jr.," Journal of the Abraham Lincoln Association 35 (Winter 2014), 43–65.
- Barr, John M. Loathing Lincoln: An American Tradition from the Civil War to the Present (LSU Press, 2014).
- Boritt, Gabor S., ed. The Historian's Lincoln. University of Illinois Press, 1988 online
- Bowden, Mark (June 2013). "Abraham Lincoln is an idiot : the difficulty of recognizing excellence in its own time". The Culture File. History. The Atlantic. 311 (5): 40–41.
- Burkhimer, Michael. One Hundred Essential Lincoln Books. Nashville, Tennessee: Cumberland House Publishing, 2003).
- Diggins, John P. On hallowed ground: Abraham Lincoln and the foundations of American history (Yale University Press, 2000) online.
- Egerton, Douglas R. "'A Measure Alike Military and Philanthropic': Historians and the Emancipation Proclamation." Pennsylvania Magazine of History and Biography 137, no. 1 (2013): 95–114 online
- Fehrenbacher, Don E. "The Anti-Lincoln Tradition." Journal of the Abraham Lincoln Association 4.1 (1982): 6-28. online
- Foner, Eric, ed. Our Lincoln: New Perspectives on Lincoln and His World (2009), essays by scholars commentary
- Guelzo, Allen C. "The not-so-grand review: Abraham Lincoln in the Journal of American History." Journal of American History 96.2 (2009): 400-416. online
- Holt, Michael F. "Lincoln Reconsidered." Journal of American History 96.2 (2009): 451–455. online
- Holzer, Harold and Craig L. Symonds, eds. Exploring Lincoln: Great Historians Reappraise Our Greatest President (2015), essays by 16 scholars online
- Jensen, Richard J. "Historiography of American political history." Encyclopedia of American Political History: Studies of the Principal Movements and Ideas 1 (1984): 1+ online.
- Kunhardt III, Philip B. et al. Looking for Lincoln: The Making of an American Icon (2012).
- Manning, Chandra, "The Shifting Terrain of Attitudes toward Abraham Lincoln and Emancipation", Journal of the Abraham Lincoln Association, 34 (Winter 2013), 18–39.
- Neely, Mark E. "The Lincoln Theme Since Randall's Call: The Promises and Perils of Professionalism." Papers of the Abraham Lincoln Association 1 (1979): 10–70. in JSTOR

External videos
- Booknotes interview with Merrill Peterson on Lincoln in American Memory, August 14, 1994, C-SPAN

- Peterson, Merrill D. (1995). Lincoln in American Memory. Oxford University Press. ISBN 978-0195096453. wide-ranging survey of how Lincoln was remembered after 1865.
- Pinsker, Matthew. "Lincoln Studies at the Bicentennial: A Round Table: Lincoln Theme 2.0." Journal of American History 96.2 (2009): 417-440 online
- Pizzetti, Jaie R. "Our National Reckoning: A Historiographical Approach to Emancipation and Lincoln." (2025) online
- Randall, James G. "Has the Lincoln Theme Been Exhausted?" American Historical Review 41#2 (1936): 270–294. online classic older survey
- Reinhart, Mark S. (2008). Abraham Lincoln on Screen. McFarland. ISBN 978-0786435364.
- Schwartz, Barry. Abraham Lincoln and the Forge of National Memory (2003) excerpt and text search
- Schwartz, Barry. Abraham Lincoln in the Post-Heroic Era: History and Memory in Late Twentieth-Century America (University of Chicago Press, 2008) online.
- Schwartz, Barry, and Howard Schuman. "History, Commemoration, and Belief: Abraham Lincoln in American Memory, 1945-2001." American Sociological Review 70.2 (2005): 183-203.online
- Sinha, Manisha. "Architects of Their Own Liberation: African Americans, Emancipation, and the Civil War". OAH Magazine of History 27, no. 2 (2013): 5–10. online
- Smith, Adam I. P. "The 'Cult' of Abraham Lincoln and the Strange Survival of Liberal England in the Era of the World Wars", Twentieth Century British History, (Dec 2010) 21#4 pp. 486–509.
- Smith, Adam I. P. (2010). "The 'Cult' of Abraham Lincoln and the Strange Survival of Liberal England in the Era of the World Wars". Twentieth Century British History. 21 (4): 486–509. doi:10.1093/tcbh/hwq023. S2CID 145087013.
- Spielberg, Steven; Goodwin, Doris Kearns; Kushner, Tony. "Mr. Lincoln Goes to Hollywood", Smithsonian (2012) 43#7 pp. 46–53.
- Thomas, Emory M. (2007). Gordon, Lesley J.; Inscoe, John C. (eds.). Inside the Confederate Nation: Essays in Honor of Emory M. Thomas. Louisiana State University Press. ISBN 978-0807132319.
- Winkle, Kenneth J. "Abraham Lincoln: self-made man." Journal of the Abraham Lincoln Association 21.2 (2000): 1-16. online
- Zilversmit, Arthur (1980). "Lincoln and the Problem of Race: A Decade of Interpretations" (PDF). Journal of the Abraham Lincoln Association. 2 (11): 22–45. Archived from the original (PDF) on October 5, 2018.

=== Lincoln in art and popular culture ===
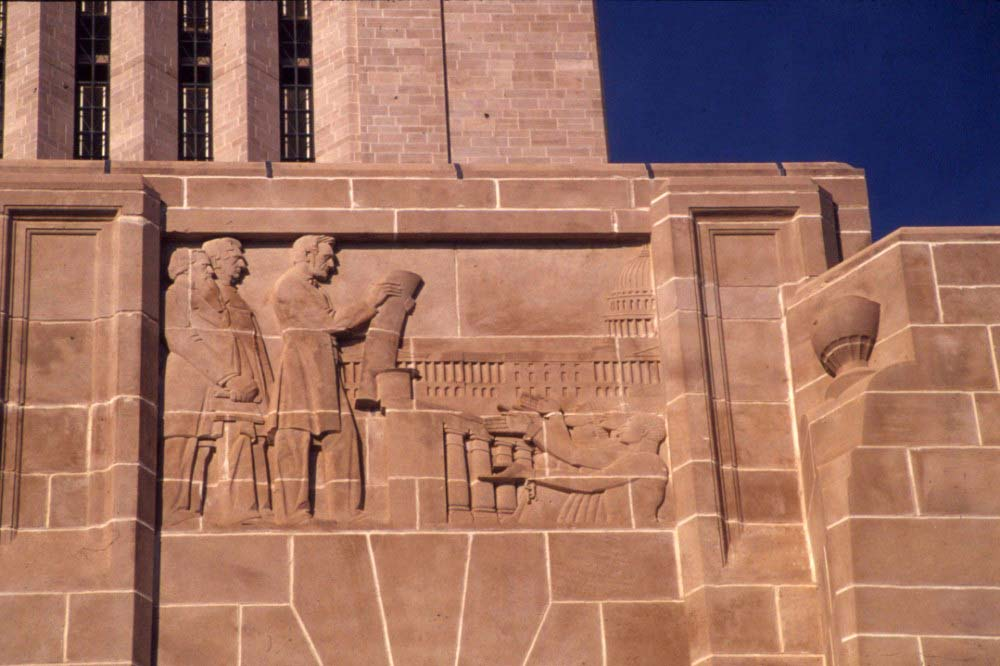
Emancipation Proclamation by Lee Lawrie

- Lauriston, Bullard. F. (1952). Lincoln in Marble and Bronze. New Brunswick, New Jersey: Rutgers University Press.
- Ferguson, Andrew (2008). Land of Lincoln: Adventures in Abe's America. Grove Press. ISBN 978-0802143617.
- Mead, Franklin B. (1932). Heroic Statues in Bronze of Abraham Lincoln: Introducing The Hoosier Youth by Paul Manship. The Lincoln National Life Foundation.
- Moffatt, Frederick C. (1998). Errant Bronzes: George Grey Barnard's Statues of Abraham Lincoln. Newark, DE: University of Delaware Press.
- Murry, Freeman Henry Morris (1972) [1916]. Emancipation and the Freed in American Sculpture. Books For Libraries Press.
- Petz, Weldon (1987). Michigan's Monumental Tributes to Abraham Lincoln. Historical Society of Michigan.
- Redway, Maurine Whorton; Bracken, Dorothy Kendall (1957). Marks of Lincoln on Our Land. New York: Hastings House, Publishers.
- Savage, Kirk (1997). Standing Soldiers, Kneeling Slaves: Race War and Monument in Nineteenth Century America. Princeton University Press.
- Tice, George (1984). Lincoln. New Brunswick, New Jersey: Rutgers University Press.

=== Primary sources ===
- Angle, Paul McClelland; Earl Schenck Miers (1955). The Living Lincoln: The Man, His Mind, His Times, and the War He Fought, Reconstructed from His Own Writings. Rutgers University Press.
- Angle, Paul McClelland; Earl Schenck Miers (1992). The Living Lincoln: The man and his times, in his own words. Barnes & Noble Publishing. ISBN 1-5661-9043-6.
- Basler, Roy; Sandburg, Carl (2008). Abraham Lincoln: His Speeches And Writings. Hachette Books. ISBN 978-0786723720.
- Basler, Roy P. et al., eds. (1953). The Collected Works of Abraham Lincoln. 9 vols. Rutgers University Press. ISBN 978-0813501727.
- Browne, Francis Fisher (1995). The Every-Day Life of Abraham Lincoln. University of Nebraska Press. ISBN 0803261152.
- Duyckinck, Evert A. (1873). "Abraham Lincoln", in Portrait Gallery of Eminent Men and Women of Europe and America. Embracing History, Statesmanship, Naval and Military Life, Philosophy, the Drama, Science, Literature and Art. With Biographies, vol. 2, pp. 399-410. New York: Johnson, Wilson and Company.
- Fehrenbacher, Don E., ed. Abraham Lincoln: Speeches and Writings 1832–1858 (Library of America, ed. 1989) ISBN 978-0940450431
- Fehrenbacher, Don E., ed. Abraham Lincoln: Speeches and Writings 1859–1865 (Library of America, ed. 1989) ISBN 978-0940450639
- Holzer, Harold, ed. (2006). Dear Mr. Lincoln: Letters to the President. Carbondale, IL: Southern Illinois University Press. ISBN 978-0-8093-2686-0.
- Lincoln, Abraham (2000). Philip Van Doren Stern (ed.). The Life and Writings of Abraham Lincoln. Modern Library Classics.
- Lincoln, Abraham. The Poems of Abraham Lincoln. Bedford, Massachusetts: Applewood Books, 1991. ISBN 1-55709-133-1
- Lincoln, Abraham (1997). Bob R. Daniels (ed.). Partial Personal Journal of Abraham Lincoln. American Heritage History.
- Rice, Allen Thorndike, ed. (1888). Reminiscences of Abraham Lincoln by Distinguished Men of His Time. New York: The North American Review Publishing Company.
- Stowell, Daniel W., et al., eds. The Papers of Abraham Lincoln: Legal Documents and Cases. (4 vols.) University of Virginia Press, 2008

=== Attacks on Lincoln ===
- Bennett, Lerone (2000). Forced into Glory: Abraham Lincoln's White Dream. Johnson Publishing Company. ISBN 978-0874850857.
- DiLorenzo, Thomas (2002). The Real Lincoln. New York: Three Rivers Press. ISBN 0761526463.
- Marshall, John A. American Bastile: A History of the Arbitrary Arrests and Imprisonment of American Citizens in the Northern and Border States, on Account of Their Political Opinions, During the Late Civil War (1883)
- Masters, Edgar Lee. Lincoln: The Man (1931)

== See also ==
- Bibliography of the American Civil War
- Bibliography of Ulysses S. Grant
- Bibliography of the Reconstruction Era
- List of bibliographies of U.S. presidents
- List of bibliographies on American history
