= Regional bibliography of the American Civil War =

In general the bibliography of the American Civil War comprises over 60,000 books on the war, with more appearing each month. There is no complete bibliography to the war; the largest guide to books is over 40 years old and lists over 6,000 titles selected by leading scholars. The largest guides to the historiography annotates over a thousand titles.

Note: This article forms part of Bibliography of the American Civil War.

== States, regions, and local ==
- Colton, Ray Charles. The Civil War in the Western Territories: Arizona, Colorado, New Mexico, and Utah. University of Oklahoma Press, 1959.
- Crofts, Daniel W. Reluctant Confederates: Upper South Unionists in the Secession Crisis. 1989.
- Fiske, John. The Mississippi Valley in the Civil War. 1900.
- Harris, William C. Lincoln and the Border States: Preserving the Union. Lawrence, Kansas: University Press of Kansas, 2011.
- Josephy, Alvin M. The Civil War in the American West. New York: Alfred A. Knopf, 1993.
- Kerby, Robert L. Kirby Smith's Confederacy: The Trans-Mississippi South, 1863–1865. Columbia University Press, 1972.
- Monaghan, Jay. Civil War on the Western Border, 1854–1865. 1955.
- Noe, Kenneth W. and Shannon H. Wilson. The Civil War in Appalachia: Collected Essays. Knoxville, Tennessee: University of Tennessee Press, 1997.
- Pittman, Walter Earl. Rebels in the Rockies: Confederate Irregulars in the Western Territories. McFarland & Company, 2014. ISBN 978-0-7864-7820-0.

=== Lincoln and the Union's war governors ===
- Hesseltine, William. Lincoln and the War Governors. New York: Alfred A. Knopf, 1948. 405 pages.
- Harris, William C. Lincoln and the Union Governors. Carbondale, IL: Southern Illinois University Press (Concise Lincoln Library), 2013. 184 pages.
- Engle, Stephen D. Gathering to Save a Nation: Lincoln and the Union's War Governors. Chapel Hill, NC: University of North Carolina Press, 2016. 725 pages. Review by A. James Fuller, comparing Engle's book to Hesseltine's and Harris's, Journal of the Abraham Lincoln Association, Volume 42, Issue 1, Winter 2021.
- Engle, Stephen D. All the President's Statesmen: Northern Governors and the American Civil War. Marquette University Press, 2006. 46 pages.

=== Alabama ===
- Bergeron, Jr., Arthur W. Confederate Mobile. Baton Rouge, Louisiana: Louisiana State University Press, 2000. ISBN 0-87805-512-6.
- Barney, William L. The Secessionist Impulse: Alabama and Mississippi in 1860. Princeton, New Jersey: Princeton University Press, 1974.
- Danielson, Joseph W. War's Desolating Scourge: The Union Occupation of North Alabama. University Press of Kansas, 2012. ISBN 978-0700618446.
- Delaney, Caldwell. Confederate Mobile: A Pictorial History. Mobile, Alabama: Haunted Book Shop, 1971.
- Denman, Clarence P. The Secession Movement in Alabama. Montgomery, Alabama: Alabama State Department of Archives and History, 1933.
- Dodd, Don. The Civil War in Winston County, Alabama, "the free state" . Northwest Alabama Pub. Co., 1979.
- Fitzgerald, W. Norma. President Lincoln's Blockade and the Defense of Mobile. Lincoln Fellowship of Wisconsin, 1954.
- Fleming, Walter L. Civil War and Reconstruction in Alabama. New York: Columbia University Press, 1905. the most detailed study; Dunning School full text online from Project Gutenberg
- Goodrow, Sister Esther Marie. Mobile During the Civil War. Mobile, Alabama: Historic Mobile Preservation Society, 1950.
- Hoole, William Stanley. Alabama Tories: The First Alabama Cavalry, U.S.A., 1862–1865. Tuscaloosa, Alabama: 1960.
- Jones, Robert C. Alabama and the Civil War: A History & Guide. The History Press, 2017. ISBN 978-1625858832.
- Martin, Bessie. Desertion of Alabama Troops from the Confederate Army. New York: AMS Press, 1988.
- McIlwain, Christopher Lyle. Civil War Alabama. University of Alabama Press, 2016.
- McMillan, Malcolm C. The Disintegration of a Confederate State: Three Governors and Alabama's Wartime Home Front, 1861–1865. Macon, Georgia: Mercer University Press, 1986.
- Noe, Kenneth W. et al., eds. The Yellowhammer War: The Civil War and Reconstruction in Alabama. University Alabama Press, 2014. ISBN 978-0817318086.
- Rigdon, John. A Guide to Alabama Civil War Research. 2011.
- Sterkx, H. E. Partners in Rebellion: Alabama Women in the Civil War. Rutherford, New Jersey: Fairleigh Dickinson University Press, 1970.
- Storey, Margaret M. "Civil War Unionists and the Political Culture of Loyalty in Alabama, 1860–1861." Journal of Southern History (2003): 71–106. in JSTOR
- Storey, Margaret M., Loyalty and Loss: Alabama's Unionists in the Civil War and Reconstruction. Baton Rouge: Louisiana State University Press, 2004.
- Towns, Peggy Allen. Duty Driven: The Plight of North Alabama's African Americans During the Civil War. 2012.

==== Primary sources For Alabama ====
- Cutrer, Thomas W. Oh, What a Lonesome Time I Had: The Civil War Letters of Major William Morel Moxley, Eighteenth Alabama Infantry, and Emily Beck Moxley. University of Alabama Press, 2002.
- Hague, Parthenia Antoinette. A blockaded family: life in southern Alabama during the Civil War. University of Nebraska Press, 2008 reprint of 1888 memoir.
- MacMillan, Malcolm, and C. Peter Ripley, eds. The Alabama Confederate Reader: An Exciting Story of the Civil War in Alabama. 1992.
- Severance, Ben H. Portraits of Conflict: A Photographic History of Alabama in the Civil War. 2012.
- Rogers, Jr., William W. Confederate Home Front: Montgomery During the Civil War. Tuscaloosa, Alabama: University of Alabama Press, 2002.

=== Arizona Territory ===
- Masich, Andrew E. The Civil War in Arizona: The Story of the California Volunteers, 1861–1865, 2nd ed., Norman: University of Oklahoma Press, 2008. ISBN 978-0806139005. OCLC 181603435.

=== Arkansas ===
- Bailey, Anne J., and Daniel E. Sutherland. "The history and historians of Civil War Arkansas." Arkansas Historical Quarterly 58.3 (1999): 232–63. in JSTOR, historiography.
- Bailey, Anne, and Daniel E. Sutherland, editors. Civil War Arkansas: Beyond Battles and Leaders. Fayetteville, Arkansas: University of Arkansas Press, 2000.
- Bradbury, John F. "'Buckwheat Cake Philanthropy': Refugees and the Union Army in the Ozarks." Arkansas Historical Quarterly 57.3 (1998): 233–254. in JSTOR
- Christ, Mark K. Civil War Arkansas, 1863: The Battle for a State. Norman, Oklahoma: University of Oklahoma Press, 2010. ISBN 978-0-8061-4087-2
- Christ, Mark K., ed. Rugged and Sublime: the Civil War in Arkansas. Fayetteville, Arkansas: University of Arkansas Press, 1994.
- DeBlack, Thomas A. With Fire and Sword: Arkansas, 1861–1874. Fayetteville, Arkansas: University of Arkansas Press, 2003.
- Dillard, Tom. "To the Back of the Elephant: Racial Conflict in the Arkansas Republican Party." Arkansas Historical Quarterly 33.1 (1974): 3–15. in JSTOR
- Donovan, Timothy Paul, Willard B. Gatewood, and Jeannie M. Whayne, eds. The Governors of Arkansas: Essays in Political Biography. University of Arkansas Press, 1995.
- Dougan, Michael B. Confederate Arkansas: The People and Policies of a Frontier State in Wartime. University, Alabama: University of Alabama Press, 1976.
- Ferguson, John L., ed. (1965). Arkansas and the Civil War. Little Rock, Arkansas: Pioneer Press. LCCN 64-25874. OCLC 951171.
- Ingenthron, Elmo. Border–Land Rebellion: A History of the Civil War on the Missouri–Arkansas Border. Bronson, Missouri: Ozarks Mountaineer, 1980.
- Moneyhon, Carl H. The Impact of the Civil War and Reconstruction on Arkansas: Persistence in the Midst of Ruin. Baton Rouge, Louisiana: Louisiana State University Press, 1994.
- Thomas David Y. Arkansas in War and Reconstruction, 1861–1874. Little Rock, Arkansas: Arkansas Division, United Daughters of the Confederacy, 1926.
- Woods, James M. Rebellion and Realignment: Arkansas's Road to Secession. Fayetteville, Arkansas: University of Arkansas Press, 1987.
- Wright, Marcus J. Arkansas in the War, 1861–1865. Batesville, Arkansas: Independence County Historical Society, 1963.

=== California ===
- Matthews, Glenna. The Golden State in the Civil War: Thomas Starr King, the Republican Party, and the Birth of Modern California. Cambridge University Press, 2012.
- Orton, Richard H. Records of California Men in the War of the Rebellion 1861 to 1867. Sacramento, California: State Printing Office, 1890.
- Richards, Leonard L. The California Gold Rush and the Coming of the Civil War. New York: Knopf, 2007.

=== Colorado ===
- Whitford, W.C. Colorado Volunteers in the Civil War. Glorieta: Rio Grande Press, 1989.

=== Connecticut ===
- Croffut, W.A. and John M. Morris. The Military and Civil History of Connecticut During the War of 1861–65. Bristol, New Hampshire: R. W. Musgrove, 1893.
- Hines, Blaikie. Civil War Volunteer Sons of Connecticut. Thomaston, Maine: American Patriot Press, 2002.
- Niven, John. Connecticut for the Union: The Role of the State in the Civil War. New Haven, Connecticut: Yale University Press, 1965.
- Warshauer, Matthew. Connecticut in the American Civil War: Slavery, Sacrifice, & Survival. Middletown, Connecticut: Wesleyan University Press, 2011. ISBN 978-0-8195-7138-0.

=== Delaware ===
- Hancock Harold. Delaware during the Civil War. Historical Society of Delaware, 1961.
- Harris, William C. Lincoln and the Border States: Preserving the Union. Lawrence, Kansas: University Press of Kansas: 2011.

=== District of Columbia ===
- Adelman, Gary E., and John J. Richtor, editors. Ninety-Nine Historic Images of Civil War Washington. Washington, D.C.: The Center for Civil War Photography and the Civil War Preservation Trust, 2006.
- Benjamin, Marcus, collector/editor. Washington during War Time: A Series of Papers Showing the Military, Political, and Social Phases during 1861–1865. Washington, D.C.: Committee on Literature for the Thirty Sixth Encampment of the Grand Army of the Republic, 1902.
- Cooling, Benjamin Franklin. Jubal Early's Raid on Washington, 1864. Baltimore: Nautical & Aviation Publishing Company of America, 1989. ISBN 0-933852-86-X.
- Cooling, B. Franklin. Mr. Lincoln's Forts: A Guide to the Civil War Defenses of Washington. Shippensburg, Pennsylvania: White Mane Publishing Company, 1988.
- Cooling, B. Franklin. Symbol, Sword, and Shield: Defending Washington during the Civil War. Hamden, Connecticut: Archon Books, 1975.
- Furgurson, Ernest B. Freedom Rising: Washington in the Civil War. New York: Alfred A. Knopf, 2004.
- Lawrence, Susan C., editor. Civil War Washington: History, Place, and Digital Scholarship. University of Nebraska Press, 2015. ISBN 978-0-8032-6286-7.
- Lee, Richard M. Mr. Lincoln's City: an Illustrated Guide to the Civil War Sites of Washington. McLean, Virginia: BPM Publications, 1981.
- Mitchell, Mary. Divided Town: A Study of Georgetown, D.C., during the Civil War. Barre, Massachusetts: Barre Publishing, 1968.
- Sedgwick, Paul. The Symbol and the Sword: Washington, D.C., 1860–1865. Washington, D.C.: District of Columbia Civil War Centennial Commission, 1962.
- Winkle, Kenneth J. Lincoln's Citadel: The Civil War in Washington, D.C. W.W. Norton, 2013. ISBN 978-0-393-08155-8.

=== Florida ===
- Brack, Gloria Conaty. This Endless Wail: The Story of the Civil War in Florida. AuthorHouse, 2006.
- Buker, George. Blockaders, Refugees, and Contrabands: Civil War on Florida's Gulf Coast, 1861–1865. Tuscaloosa: Fire Ant Books, 2004. ISBN 978-0-8173-1296-1.
- Davis, William Watson. The Civil War and Reconstruction in Florida. New York: Columbia University Press, 1913.
- Dodd, Dorothy. Florida in the War, 1861–1865. Tallahassee, Florida: Peninsular Publishing, 1959.
- Driscoll, John K. The Civil War on Pensacola Bay, 1861–1862. Jefferson, North Carolina: McFarland & Company, Inc., 2013. ISBN 978-0-7864-7512-4.
- Fretwell, Jacqueline K., editor. Civil War Times in St. Augustine. St. Augustine, Florida: St. Augustine Historical Society, 1988.
- Johns, John E. Florida during the Civil War. Gainesville, Florida: University of Florida Press, 1963.
- Loderhose, Gary. Way Down Upon the Suwannee River: Sketches of Florida During the Civil War. iUniverse, 2000.
- Martin, Richard and Daniel L. Schafer. Jacksonville's Ordeal by Fire: A Civil War History. Jacksonville, Florida: Florida Publishing, 1964.
- Nulty, William H. Confederate Florida: The Road to Olustee. Tuscaloosa: University of Alabama Press, 1994. ISBN 978-0-8173-0748-6.
- Pearce, George. Pensacola during the Civil War: A Thorn in the Side of the Confederacy. Gainesville, Florida: University of Florida Press, 2000.
- Revels, Tracy J. Florida's Civil War: Terrible Sacrifices. Macon, Georgia: Mercer University Press, 2016. ISBN 978-0-88146-589-1.
- Schafer, Daniel L. Thunder on the River: The Civil War in Northeast Florida. Gainesville, FL: University Press of Florida, 2010. ISBN 978-0-8130-3419-5.
- Taylor, Robert A. Rebel Storehouse: Florida in the Confederate Economy. Tuscaloosa, Alabama: University of Alabama Press, 1995.
- Winsboro, Irvin D.S. Florida's Civil War: Explorations into Conflict, Interpretations and Memory. Florida Historical Society Press, 2007.
- Wynne, Lewis Nicholas, and Robert A. Taylor. Florida in the Civil War. Chicago, Illinois: Arcadia Publishing, 2002. ISBN 0-7385-1491-8.

=== Georgia ===
- Brown, Barry L. and Gordon R. Elwell. Crossroads of Conflict: A Guide to Civil War Sites in Georgia. Athens, Georgia: University of Georgia Press, 2010.
- Bryan, Thomas Conn. Confederate Georgia. Athens, Georgia: University of Georgia Press, 1953.
- Chandler, Ray. The Last Days of the Confederacy in Northeast Georgia. The History Press, 2015. ISBN 978-1626193444.
- Fowler, John D. and David B. Parker, editors. Breaking the Heartland: The Civil War in Georgia. Macon, Georgia: Mercer University Press, 2011. ISBN 978-0-88146-240-1.
- Inscoe, John C., editor The Civil War in Georgia: A New Georgia Encyclopedia Companion. Athens, Georgia: University of Georgia Press, 2011. ISBN 978-0-8203-4138-5.
- Iobst, Richard W. Civil War Macon: The History of a Confederate City. Macon, Georgia: Mercer University Press, 2009. ISBN 978-0-88146-172-5.
- Jones, Jacqueline. Saving Savannah: The City and the Civil War. New York: Random House, Inc., 2009.
- King, Jr., Spencer B. Darien: The Death and Rebirth of a Southern Town. (Mercer University Press, 1981).
- Lenz, Richard J. The Civil War in Georgia: An Illustrated Traveler's Guide. Infinity Press, 1995.
- Monroe, Haskell, editor. Yankees A'coming: One Month's Experience During the Invasion of Liberty County, Georgia, 1864–1865. (Tuscaloosa: Confederate Pub. Co., 1959).
- Miles, Jim. Civil War Sites in Georgia. Rutledge Hill Press, 1996.
- Sarris, Jonathan Dean. A Separate Civil War: Communities in Conflict in the Mountain South Charlottesville: University of Virginia Press, 2006.
- Wetherington, Mark V. Plain Folk's Fight: The Civil War and Reconstruction in Piney Woods Georgia. (U of North Carolina Press, 2005).
- Whites, Lee Ann. The Civil War as a Crisis in Gender: Augusta, Georgia, 1860–1890. Athens, Georgia: University of Georgia Press, 1995.
- Williams, David, Teresa Crisp Williams, and David Carlson. Plain Folk in a Rich Man's War: Class and Dissent in Confederate Georgia. Gainesville, Florida: University Press of Florida, 2002.

=== Illinois ===
- Allardice, Bruce S. "" Illinois is Rotten with Traitors!" The Republican Defeat in the 1862 State Election." Journal of the Illinois State Historical Society (2011): 97–114.
- Bohn, Roger E. "Richard Yates: An Appraisal of his Value as the Civil War Governor of Illinois," Journal of the Illinois State Historical Society Spring/Summer2011, Vol. 104 Issue 1/2, pp 17–37
- Cole, Arthur Charles. The Era of the Civil War 1848–1870 (1919), the standard scholarly history; vol 3 of The Centennial History of Illinois
- Duerkes, Wayne N. "'I for one am ready to do my part': The initial motivations that inspired men from Northern Illinois to enlist in the U.S. Army, 1861–1862," Journal of the Illinois State Historical Society (2012) 105#4 pp 313–32
- Hicken, Victor. Illinois in the Civil War. University of Illinois Press, 1991. ISBN 0-252-06165-9.
- Hubbard, Mark, editor. Illinois’s War: The Civil War in Documents. Ohio University Press, 2012. ISBN 978-0821420102.
- Karamanski, Theodore J. and Eileen M. McMahon, eds. Civil War Chicago: Eyewitness to History. Ohio University Press, 2015. ISBN 978-0-8214-2084-3.
- Karamanski, Theodore J., Rally 'Round the Flag: Chicago and the Civil War. Nelson-Hall, 1993. ISBN 0-8304-1295-6.
- Levy, George. To Die in Chicago: Confederate Prisoners at Camp Douglas, 1862–65. (2nd ed. 1999) excerpt and text search.
- Pierce, Bessie Louise. A History of Chicago: Volume II: From Town to City 1848–1871 (1937)
- Reiff, Janice L., Ann Durkin Keating, and James R. Grossman, eds. The Encyclopedia of Chicago (2005) online version

==== Primary sources ====
- Voss-Hubbard, Mark, ed. Illinois's War: The Civil War in Documents. (Ohio University Press, 2013) 244 pp. online review

=== Indian Territory (Oklahoma) ===
- Britton, Wiley. Memoirs of the Rebellion on the Border. Whitefish, Montana: Kessinger Publishing, 2010. ISBN 1164425234.
- Cantrell, M. L. and Mac Harris, eds. Kepis & Turkey Calls: An Anthology of the War Between the States in Indian Territory. Oklahoma City, Oklahoma: Western Heritage Books, 1982.
- Clampitt, Bradley R. The Civil War and Reconstruction in the Indian Territory. Lincoln, Nebraska: University of Nebraska Press, 2015. ISBN 978-0-8032-7727-4.
- Confer, Clarissa W. The Cherokee Nation in the Civil War. Norman, Oklahoma: University of Oklahoma Press, 2007.
- Edwards, Whit. The Prairie was on Fire: Eyewitness Accounts of the Civil War in the Indian Territory. Oklahoma City, Oklahoma: Oklahoma Historical Society, 2001. ISBN 0941498727
- Fischer, Leroy H., ed. The Civil War in Indian Territory. Los Angeles, California: Morrison, 1974.
- Franks, Kenny A. Stand Watie and the Agony of the Cherokee Nation. Memphis, Tennessee: Memphis State University Press, 1979.
- Knight, Winfred Red Fox: Stand Watie's Civil War Years in the Indian Territory. Glendale, California: Arthur H. Clark, 1988.
- McBride, Lela J. Opothleyaholo and the Loyal Muscogee: Their Flight to Kansas in the Civil War. Jefferson, North Carolina: McFarland, 1999.
- Lause, Mark A. Race & Radicalism in the Union Army. Urbana and Chicago: University of Illinois Press, 2009.
- Rampp, Lary C., and Donald L. Rampp. The Civil War in the Indian Territory. Austin, Texas: Presidial Press, 1975.
- Spencer, John. The American Civil War in Indian Territory. United Kingdom: Osprey Publishing, 2006. ISBN 1-84603-000-5.
- Warde, Mary Jane. When the Wolf Came: The Civil War and the Indian Territory. Fayetteville, Arkansas: University of Arkansas Press, 2013.

=== Indiana ===
- Barnhart, John D. "The Impact of the Civil War on Indiana," Indiana Magazine of History (1961) 57#3 pp. 185–224 in JSTOR
- Foulke, William D. (1899). Life of Oliver P. Morton. Bowen-Merrill Company.
- Funk, Arville L (1967). Hoosiers in the Civil War. Chicago: Adams Press. ISBN 0-9623292-5-8.
- Holliday, John. (1911). Indianapolis and the Civil War. E. J. Hecker.
- Nation, Richard F. "Violence and the Rights of African Americans in Civil War-Era Indiana," Indiana Magazine of History (2004) 100#3 pp 215–230, online
- Nelson, Jacquelyn S. "The Military Response of the Society of Friends in Indiana to the Civil War," Indiana Magazine of History (1985) 81#2 pp 101–130, on Quakers; online
- Rodgers, Thomas E. "Hoosier Women and the Civil War Home Front," Indiana Magazine of History (2001) 97#2 pp 105–128 online
- Sharp, Walter Rice. "Henry S. Lane and the Formation of the Republican Party in Indiana," Mississippi Valley Historical Review (1920) 7#2 pp. 93–112 in JSTOR
- Stampp, Kenneth M. Indiana politics during the Civil War (1949); monograph by leading scholar
- Thornbrough, Emma Lou. Indiana in the Civil War Era, 1850–1880 (1965); the standard scholarly history
- Towne, Stephen E. "Killing the Serpent Speedily: Governor Morton, General Hascall, and the Suppression of the Democratic Press in Indiana, 1863," Civil War History (2006) 52 #1 pp 41–65.
- Turner, Ann, ed. A Chronology of Indiana in the Civil War. Indianapolis, Indiana: Indiana Civil War Centennial Commission, 1965.

==== Primary sources ====
- Nation, Richard F., and Stephen E. Towne. Indiana's War: The Civil War in Documents (2009), primary sources excerpt and text search
- Terrell, W. H. H. Indiana in the War of the Rebellion. Report of the Adjutant General (1969), reprinted by Indiana Historical Collections Volume XLI (1960)

=== Iowa ===
- Clark, Olynthus B. The Politics of Iowa During the Civil War and Reconstruction (Clio Press, 1911) online.
- Ingersoll, L.D. Iowa and the Rebellion. Philadelphia, Pennsylvania: J.B. Lippincott & Co., 1867.
- Johnson, Russell L. "The Civil War generation: military service and mobility in Dubuque, Iowa, 1860–1870." Journal of social history (1999): 791–820. in JSTOR
- Lyftogt, Kenneth. From Blue Mills to Columbia: Cedar Falls and the Civil War (Iowa State University Press, 1993).
- Schwalm, Leslie Ann. "" Overrun with free Negroes": emancipation and wartime migration in the Upper Midwest." Civil War History 50.2 (2004): 145–174. online
- Wubben, Hubert H. Civil War Iowa and the Copperhead Movement (Wiley-Blackwell, 1980).
- Wubben, Hubert H. "The Uncertain Trumpet: Iowa Republicans and Black Suffrage, 1860–1868." Annals of Iowa 44 (1984): 409–29.
- Wubben, Hubert H. "Dennis Mahony and the Dubuque Herald, 1860–1863." Iowa Journal of History 56: 289–320.

=== Kansas ===
- Castel, Albert. Civil War Kansas: Reaping the Whirlwind. Lawrence, Kansas: University Press of Kansas, 1997. ISBN 978-0-7006-0872-0.
- Etcheson, Nicole. Bleeding Kansas: Contested Liberty in the Civil War Era. Topeka, Kansas: University Press of Kansas, 2004.
- Gilmore, Donald L. Civil War on the Missouri–Kansas Border. Gretna, Louisiana: Pelican Publishing Company, 2005. ISBN 978-1-58980-329-9.
- Wood, Larry E. The Civil War on the Lower Kansas–Missouri Border. Hickory Press, 2000.

=== Kentucky ===
- Astor, Aaron. Rebels on the Border: Civil War, Emancipation, and the Reconstruction of Kentucky and Missouri. Louisiana State University Press, 2012.
- Brown, Kent Masterson. The Civil War in Kentucky: Battle for the Bluegrass State. Campbell, California: Savas Publishing Company, 2000. ISBN 1-882810-47-3.
- Bush, Bryan S. Louisville and the Civil War: A History and Guide. Charleston, South Carolina: The History Press, 2008.
- Cashon, John Philip. Paducah and the Civil War. The History Press, 2016. ISBN 978-1467136969.
- Coulter, E. Merton. The Civil War and Readjustment in Kentucky. Chapel Hill, North Carolina: University of North Carolina Press, 1926.
- Craig, Berry. Kentucky Confederates: Secession, Civil War, and the Jackson Purchase. University Press of Kentucky, 2014. ISBN 978-0-8131-4692-8.
- Craig, Berry. Kentucky’s Rebel Press: Pro-Confederate Media and the Secession Crisis. University of Kentucky Press, 2018. ISBN 978-0813174594.
- Harris, William C. Lincoln and the Border States: Preserving the Union (University Press of Kansas; 2011) 416 pages
- Harrison, Lowell. The Civil War in Kentucky University Press of Kentucky, 1975.
- Lee, Dan. The Civil War in the Jackson Purchase, 1861–1862: The Pro–Confederate Struggle and Defeat in Southwest Kentucky. McFarland and Company, 2014. ISBN 978-0-7864-7782-1.
- Leet, Joshua and Karen M. Leet. Civil War Lexington, Kentucky: Bluegrass Breeding Ground of Power. Charleston, South Carolina: The History Press, 2011.
- McDowell, Robert Emmett. City of Conflict: Louisville in the Civil War, 1861–1865. Louisville, Kentucky: Louisville Civil War Round Table, 1962.
- McKnight, Brian D. Contested Borderland: The Civil War in Appalachian Kentucky and Virginia. University Press of Kentucky, 2006.
- Penn, William A. Kentucky Rebel Town: The Civil War Battles of Cynthiana and Harrison County. University Press of Kentucky, 2016. ISBN 978-0813167718.
- Priston, John David. The Civil War in the Big Sandy Valley of Kentucky. Gateway Press, 2009.
- Ramage, James A. and Andrea S. Watkins. Kentucky Rising: Democracy, Slavery, and Culture from the Early Republic to the Civil War. University Press of Kentucky, 2011. ISBN 978-0813134406.
- Smith, John David, editor. New Perspectives on Civil War-Era Kentucky. University Press of Kentucky, 2023. ISBN 978-0813197463.
- Smith, John David. "Whither Kentucky Civil War and Reconstruction Scholarship?." Register of the Kentucky Historical Society 112.2 (2014): 223–247. online

=== Louisiana ===
- Ayres, Thomas. Dark and Bloody Ground: The Battle of Mansfield and the Forgotten Civil War in Louisiana. Dallas, Texas: Taylor Trade, 2001.
- Bragg, Jefferson Davis. Louisiana in the Confederacy. Baton Rouge, Louisiana: Louisiana State University Press, 1941.
- Capers, Gerald M. Occupied City: New Orleans Under the Federals 1862–1865. University Press of Kentucky, 2014. ISBN 978-0813151625.
- Dimitry, John. Confederate Military History of Louisiana: Louisiana in the Civil War, 1861–1865. 2007.
- Dufrene, Dennis J. Civil War Baton Rouge, Port Hudson and Bayou Sara: Capturing the Mississippi. Charleston, South Carolina: The History Press, 2012. ISBN 978-1609493516.
- Hollandsworth Jr, James G. The Louisiana Native Guards: The Black Military Experience During the Civil War. Baton Rouge, Louisiana: Louisiana State University Press, 1995.
- Johnson, Ludwell H. Red River Campaign, Politics & Cotton in the Civil War. Kent State University Press, 1993.
- McCrary, Peyton. Abraham Lincoln and Reconstruction: The Louisiana Experiment. Princeton, New Jersey: Princeton University Press, 1979.
- Peña, Christopher G. Scarred By War: Civil War in Southeast Louisiana. 2004.
- Ripley, C. Peter. Slaves and Freedmen in Civil War Louisiana. 1976.
- Tunnell, Ted. Crucible of Reconstruction: War, Radicalism, and Race in Louisiana, 1862–1877. Baton Rouge, Louisiana: Louisiana State University Press, 1992.
- Winters, John D. The Civil War in Louisiana. Baton Rouge: Louisiana State University Press, 1963. ISBN 0-8071-0834-0.

=== Maine ===
- Dalton, Peter. Union vs. Dis-Union: The Contribution of a Small Maine Town to the American Civil War, 1861–1865. Union Publishing Company, 1993.
- Gratwick, Harry. Mainers in the Civil War. Charleston, South Carolina: The History Press, 2011. ISBN 978-1596299627.
- Whitman, William E.S., and Charles H. True. Maine in the War for the Union: A History of the Part Bourn by Main Troops. Lewiston, Maine: Nelson Dingley, Jr. & Co., 1865.

=== Maryland ===
- Adams, Charles S. The Civil War in Washington County, Maryland: A Guide to 66 Points of Interest. Dabsboro, Delaware: published by author, 2001.
- Baker, Jean H. The Politics of Continuity: Maryland Political Parties from 1858 to 1870. The Johns Hopkins University Press, 1973.
- Branch, Nathania A., Miles, Monday M. Miles, and Ryan J. Quick. Prince George's County and the Civil War: Life on the Border. Charleston, South Carolina: The History Press, 2013. ISBN 978-1609498481.
- Brown, George William. Baltimore and the Nineteenth of April, 1861: A Study of the War. The Johns Hopkins University Press, 2001. Originally published in 1887. The author was the mayor of Baltimore in 1861.
- Cotton, Robert and Mary Ellen Hayward. Maryland in the Civil War: A House Divided. Baltimore, Maryland: Maryland Historical Society, 1994.
- Cox, Richard P. Civil War Maryland: Stories from the Old Line State. Charleston, South Carolina: The History Press, 2008. ISBN 978-1596294196.
- Ezratty, Harry A. Baltimore in the Civil War: The Pratt Street Riot and a City Occupied. Charleston, South Carolina: The History Press, 2010. ISBN 978-1609490034.
- Fields, Barbara. Slavery and Freedom on the Middle Ground: Maryland During the Nineteenth Century (1987).
- Floyd, Claudia. Union-Occupied Maryland: A Civil War Chronicle of Civilians & Soldiers. Charleston, South Carolina: The History Press, 2014. ISBN 978-1626196117.
- Gordon, Paul and Rita. A Playground of the Civil War: Frederick County, Maryland. Frederick, Maryland: Marken and Bielfeld, 1928.
- Harris, William C. Lincoln and the Border States: Preserving the Union. University Press of Kansas, 2011.
- Keller, Roger S. Events of the Civil War in Washington County, Maryland. Shippensburg, Pennsylvania: White Mane, 1995.
- Klein, Frederick Shriver, ed. Just South of Gettysburg: Carroll County, Maryland in the Civil War. Westminster, Maryland: Carroll County Historical Society, 1963.
- Manakee, Harold R. Maryland in the Civil War. Baltimore, Maryland: Maryland Historical Society, 1961.
- Mills, Eric. Chesapeake Bay in the Civil War. Centreville, Maryland: Tidewaters Publishers, 1997.
- Morris, R. Rebecca. A Low, Dirty Place: The Parole Camps of Annapolis, MD, 1862-1865. Linthicum, Maryland: Ann Arrundell County Historical Society, 2013.
- Newman, Harry Wright. Maryland and the Confederacy. Annapolis, Maryland: published by author, 1976.
- Oshell, Robert E. Silver Spring and the Civil War. Charleston, South Carolina: The History Press, 2014. ISBN 978-1626194175.
- Schildt, John W. Frederick in the Civil War: Battle and Honor in the Spired City. Charleston, South Carolina: The History Press, 2010. ISBN 978-1609490782.
- Toews, Rockford E. Lincoln in Annapolis: February 1865. Maryland State Archives, 2009.
- Toomey, Daniel Carroll. The Civil War in Maryland. Baltimore, Maryland: Toomey Press, 1983.

=== Massachusetts ===
- Ellis, Robert P. Northborough in the Civil War: Citizen Soldiering and Sacrifice. Charleston, South Carolina: The History Press, 2007. ISBN 978-1596292208.
- Hallett, William. Newburyport and the Civil War. Charleston, South Carolina: The History Press, 2012. ISBN 978-1609494483.
- Miller, Stauffer. Cape Cod and the Civil War: The Raised Right Arm. Charleston, South Carolina: The History Press, 2010. ISBN 978-1596299849.
- Patrakis, Joan Silva. Andover in the Civil War: The Spirit and Sacrifice of a New England Town. Charleston, South Carolina: The History Press, 2008. ISBN 978-1596294370.

=== Michigan ===
- Bak, Richard. A Distant Thunder: Michigan in the Civil War. Chelsea: Huron River, 2004.
- Dempsey, Jack. Michigan and the Civil War: A Great and Bloody Sacrifice. Charleston, South Carolina: The History Press, 2011.
- Lennard, Ray. Lenawee County and the Civil War. The History Press, 2016. ISBN 978-1467135528.
- Mason, Philip P. and Paul J. Pentecost. From Bull Run to Appomattox: Michigan's Role in the Civil War. Detroit, Michigan: Wayne State University Press, 1961.
- Robertson, John. Michigan in the War. Lansing, Michigan: W. S. George & Co., 1882.

=== Minnesota ===
- Andrews, C. C. Minnesota in the Civil and Indian Wars, 1861–65. St. Paul, Minnesota: 1891.
- Carley, Kenneth. Minnesota in the Civil War: An Illustrated History. St. Paul, Minnesota: Minnesota Historical Society, 2005.

=== Mississippi ===
- Ballard, Michael B. The Civil War in Mississippi: Major Campaigns and Battles. Jackson, Mississippi: University Press of Mississippi, 2011. ISBN 978-1-60473-842-1.
- Barney, William L. The Secessionist Impulse: Alabama and Mississippi in 1860. Princeton, New Jersey: Princeton University Press, 1974.
- Burns, Zed. Ship Island and the Confederacy. Hattiesburg, Mississippi: University and College Press of Mississippi, 1971.
- Enzweiler, Stephen. Oxford in the Civil War: Battle for a Vanquished Land. Charleston, South Carolina: The History Press, 2010. ISBN 978-1596293182.
- Jenkins, Sally and John Stauffer. The State of Jones: The Small Southern County that Seceded from the Confederacy. New York: Anchor Books, 2009. ISBN 978-0-7679-2946-2.

=== Missouri ===
- Arenson, Adam. The Great Heart of the Republic: St. Louis and the Cultural Civil War. Cambridge, Massachusetts: Harvard University Press, 2011. ISBN 978-0-674-05288-8.
- Astor, Aaron. Rebels on the Border: Civil War, Emancipation, and the Reconstruction of Kentucky and Missouri. Louisiana State University Press, 2012.
- Bartels, Carolyn. The Civil War in Missouri: Day by Day, 1861 to 1865. Shawnee Mission, Kansas: Two Trails, 1992.
- Boman, Dennis K. Lincoln's Resolute Unionist: Hamilton Gamble, Dred Scott Dissenter and Missouri's Civil War Governor. Louisiana State University Press, 2006.
- Erwin, James W. Guerrillas in Civil War Missouri. Charleston, South Carolina: The History Press, 2012. ISBN 978-1609493882.
- Erwin, James W. Guerrilla Hunters in Civil War Missouri. Charleston, South Carolina: The History Press, 2013. ISBN 978-1609497453.
- Erwin, James W. The Homefront in Civil War Missouri. Charleston, South Carolina: The History Press, 2014. ISBN 978-1626194335.
- Fellman, Michael. Inside War: The Guerrilla Conflict in Missouri during the American Civil War (1989).
- Fitzsimmons, Margaret Louise. "Missouri Railroads During the Civil War and Reconstruction." Missouri Historical Review 35#2 (1941) pp. 188–206
- Geiger, Mark W. Financial Fraud and Guerrilla Violence in Missouri's Civil War, 1861–1865. Yale University Press, 2010. (ISBN 978-0300151510)
- Gerteis, Louis S., Civil War St. Louis. Lawrence, Kansas: University Press of Kansas, 2001. ISBN 978-0-7006-1124-9.
- Gerteis, Louis S., The Civil War in Missouri: A Military History. Columbia, Missouri: University of Missouri Press, 2012. ISBN 978-0-8262-1972-5.
- Gilmore, Donald L. Civil War on the Missouri–Kansas Border. Gretna, Louisiana: Pelican Publishing Company, 2005. ISBN 978-158980-329-9.
- Harris, William C. Lincoln and the Border States: Preserving the Union. Lawrence, Kansas: University Press of Kansas, 2011.
- Hess, Earl J. "The 12th Missouri Infantry: A Socio-Military Profile of a Union Regiment," Missouri Historical Review (October 1981) 76#1 pp 53–77.
- Kamphoefner, Walter D., "Missouri Germans and the Cause of Union and Freedom," Missouri Historical Review, 106#2 (April 2012), 115–36.
- Lause, Mark A. Price's Lost Campaign: The 1864 Invasion of Missouri. Columbia, Missouri: University of Missouri Press, 2011.
- Lause, Mark A. The Collapse of Price’s Raid: the Beginning of the End in Civil War Missouri. Columbia, Missouri: University of Missouri Press, 2016.
- McGhee, James E. Guide to Missouri Confederate Units, 1861–1865. University of Arkansas Press, 2008.
- Nichols, Bruce. Guerilla Warfare in Civil War Missouri, 1862. Jefferson, North Carolina: McFarland & Company, 2004.
- Parrish, William E. A History of Missouri, Volume III: 1860 to 1875. 1973, reprinted 2002. ISBN 0-8262-0148-2.
- Parrish, William E. Turbulent Partnership: Missouri and the Union, 1861–1865. Columbia, Missouri: University of Missouri Press, 1963.
- Phillips, Christopher. Missouri's Confederate: Claiborne Fox Jackson and the Creation of Southern Identity in the Border West. Columbia, Missouri: University of Missouri Press, 2000. ISBN 978-0-8262-1272-6.
- Potter, Marguerite. "Hamilton R. Gamble, Missouri's War Governor." Missouri Historical Review 35#1 (1940): 25–72
- Stith, Matthew M. "At the Heart of Total War: Guerrillas, Civilians, and the Union Response in Jasper County, Missouri, 1861–1865," Military History of the West 38#1 (2008), 1–27.
- Thoma, James F. This Cruel Unnatural War: The American Civil War in Cooper County, Missouri. Kingsport, Tennessee: James F. Thoma, 2003.
- Wood, Larry. Civil War Springfield. Charleston, South Carolina: The History Press, 2011. ISBN 978-1609493080.
- Wood, Larry E. The Civil War on the Lower Kansas–Missouri Border. Hickory Press, 2000.

==== Primary sources ====
- Siddali, Silvana R., ed. Missouri's War: The Civil War in Documents. Athens: Ohio University Press, 2009.

=== Montana Territory ===
- Robison, Ken. Confederates in Montana Territory: In the Shadow of Price's Army. Charleston, South Carolina: The History Press, 2014. ISBN 978-1626196032.
- Robison, Ken. Montana Territory and the Civil War: A Frontier Forged on the Battlefield. Charleston, South Carolina: The History Press, 2013. ISBN 978-1626191754.

=== Nebraska ===
- Potter, James E. Standing Firmly by the Flag: Nebraska Territory and the Civil War, 1861–1867. Omaha, Nebraska: Nebraska State Historical Society, 2012. ISBN 978-0-8032-4090-2.

=== New Hampshire ===
- Cleveland, Mather. New Hampshire Fights the Civil War. New London, New Hampshire: published by author, 1969.
- Heald, Bruce D. New Hampshire and the Civil War: Voices from the Granite State. Charleston, South Carolina: The History Press, 2012. ISBN 978-1609496289.
- Waite, Otis F.B. New Hampshire in the Great Rebellion. Claremont, New Hampshire: Tracy, Chase & Co., 1870.

=== New Jersey ===
- Bilby, Joseph G. and William C. Goble. "Remember you are Jerseymen!": A Military History of New Jersey's Troops in the Civil War. Longstreet House, 1998.
- Jackson, William J. New Jerseyans in the Civil War: For Union and Liberty. New Brunswick, New Jersey: Rutgers University Press, 2000.
- Rajoppi, Joanne Hamilton. New Brunswick and the Civil War: The Brunswick Boys in the Great Rebellion. Charleston, South Carolina: The History Press, 2013. ISBN 978-1626191747.
- Siegel, Alan A. For the Glory of the Union: Myth, Reality, and the Media in Civil War New Jersey. Rutherford, New Jersey: Fairleigh Dickinson University Press, 1984.

=== New Mexico Territory ===
- Cottrell, Steve. Civil War in Texas and New Mexico Territory. Gretna, Louisiana: Pelican Publishing Company, Inc., 1998. ISBN 1-56554-253-3.
- Ganaway, Loomis Morton. New Mexico and the Sectional Controversy, 1846–1861. Santa Fe, New Mexico: Historical Society of New Mexico, 1944.
- Grinstead, Mario C. Life and Death of a Frontier Fort: Fort Craig, New Mexico, 1854–1885. Socorro: Socorro County Historical Society, 1973
- Keleher, W.A. Turmoil in New Mexico: 1848–1868. Santa Fe, New Mexico: Rydal Press, 1952.
- Pittman, Walter Earl. New Mexico and The Civil War. Charleston, South Carolina: The History Press, 2011. ISBN 978-1609491376
- Stanley, F. The Civil War in New Mexico. Denver, Colorado: The World Press, 1960.

=== New York ===
- Cook, Adrian. The Armies of the Streets: The New York City Draft Riots of 1863. Lexington, Kentucky: University Press of Kentucky, 1979.
- Hamm, Theodore, ed. Frederick Douglass in Brooklyn. Brooklyn, NY: Akashic Books, 2017. Speeches by Frederick Douglass given in Brooklyn.
- Hunt, Harrison, and Bill Bleyer. Long Island and the Civil War: Queens, Nassau and Suffolk Counties During the War Between the States. The History Press, 2015. ISBN 978-1626197718
- Johnson, Clint. A Vast and Fiendish Plot: The Confederate Attack on New York City. New York: Kensington Publishing Corp., 2010. ISBN 978-0806531311
- Livingston, E. A. "Bud". Brooklyn and the Civil War. Charleston, South Carolina: The History Press, 2012.
- McKay, Ernest A. The Civil War and New York City. Syracuse, New York: Syracuse University Press, 1990.
- Phisterer, Frederick. New York in the War of the Rebellion, 1861–1865. Albany, New York: J. B. Lyon and Company, 1912.
- Plank, Will. Banners and Bugles: A Record of Ulster County, New York and the Mid–Hudson Region in the Civil War. Marlborough, New York: Centennial Press, 1963.
- Snyder, Charles. Oswego County, New York in the Civil War. Oswego County Historical Society, 1962.
- Spann, Edward K. Gotham at War: New York City, 1860–1865. Wilmington, Delaware: Scholarly Resources, 2002.

=== North Carolina ===
- Auman, William T. Civil War in the North Carolina Quaker Belt: The Confederate Campaign Against Peace Agitators, Deserters and Draft Dodgers. Jefferson, NC: McFarland & Company, Inc., 2014. ISBN 978-0-7864-7663-3
- Barrett, John G. The Civil War in North Carolina. Chapel Hill, North Carolina: University of North Carolina Press, 1963. ISBN 0-8078-0874-1.
- Browning, Judkin. Shifting Loyalties: The Union Occupation of Eastern North Carolina. Chapel Hill, North Carolina: University of North Carolina Press, 2011. ISBN 978-0-8078-3468-8.
- Carbone, John S. The Civil War in Coastal North Carolina. Division of Archives and History, North Carolina Department of Cultural Resources, 2001.
- Casstevens, Frances H. The Civil War and Yadkin County, North Carolina: A History, with Contemporary Photographs and Letters; New Evidence Regarding Home Guard Activity and the Shootout at the Bond School House; a Roster of Militia Officers; the Names of Yadkin Men at Appomattox; and 1200 Confederate Army and Navy Service Records with Parents, Vital Dates, and Place of Burial for Most. Jefferson, North Carolina: McFarland & Company, Inc., 2005. ISBN 978-0-7864-2444-3.
- Crawford, Martin. Ashe County's Civil War: Community and Society in the Appalachian South. Charlottesville, Virginia: University Press of Virginia, 2001.
- Hardy, Michael C. Civil War Charlotte: The Last Capital of the Confederacy. Charleston, South Carolina: The History Press, 2012. ISBN 978-1609494803.
- Hardy, Michael C. North Carolina in the Civil War. Charleston, South Carolina: The History Press: 2011. Excerpt and text search
- Hardy, Michael C. Watauga County, North Carolina, in the Civil War. Charleston, South Carolina: The History Press, 2013. ISBN 978-1609498887.
- Inscoe, John C. and Gordon B. McKinney. The Heart of Confederate Appalachia: Western North Carolina in the Civil War. Chapel Hills, North Carolina: University of North Carolina Press, 2000.
- Mallison, Fred M. The Civil War on the Outer Banks: A History of the Late Rebellion Along the Coast of North Carolina from Carteret to Currituck, with Comments on Prewar Conditions and an Account of Postwar Recovery. Jefferson, North Carolina: McFarland & Company, Inc., 2005. ISBN 978-0-7864-2418-4.
- Meekins, Alex C. Elizabeth City, North Carolina and the Civil War. Charleston, South Carolina: The History Press, 2007. ISBN 978-1-59629-212-3.
- Miller, Steve M. North Carolina Unionists and the Fight Over Secession. The History Press, 2019. ISBN 978-1625859372.
- Moore, Carol. Guilford County and the Civil War. Charleston, South Carolina: The History Press, 2015. ISBN 978-1626198494.
- Reid, Richard M. Freedom for Themselves: North Carolina's Black Soldiers in the Civil War Era. 2008. excerpt and text search
- Silkenat, David. "Driven from Home: North Carolina's Civil War Refugee Crisis". 2016.
- Silkenat, David. Moments of Despair: Suicide, Divorce, and Debt in Civil War Era North Carolina. Chapel Hill, North Carolina: University of North Carolina Press, 2011. ISBN 978-0-8078-3460-2.
- Sitterson, Joseph Carlyle. The Secession Movement in North Carolina. Chapel Hill, North Carolina: University of North Carolina Press, 1939.
- Trotter, William R. Silk Flags and Cold Steel: The Civil War in North Carolina: The Piedmont. Winston-Salem, North Carolina: John F. Blair, Publisher, 1988. ISBN 0-89587086-X.
- White. III, James Edward. New Bern and the Civil War. Charleston, SC: History Press, 2018. ISBN 978-1-62585-992-1.

==== Primary sources ====
- Clinard, Karen L. And Richard Russell, eds. Fear in North Carolina: The Civil War Journals and Letters of the Henry Family. 2008. excerpt and text search

=== Ohio ===
- (no author listed) Official Roster of the Soldiers of the State of Ohio in the War of the Rebellion, 1861–1866, twelve volumes. Cincinnati, Ohio: The Ohio Valley Press, 1888.
- McKinley, William; Taylor, Samuel M; Howe, James C. (1893). Official roster of the soldiers of the state of Ohio in the War of the Rebellion, 1861–1866 vol I. Ohio. Roster Commission; Ohio. General Assembly, Ohio; Werner Publishing Co.
- Foraker, Joseph B.; Robinson, James S.; Axline, H.A. (1886). Official roster of the soldiers of the state of Ohio in the War of the Rebellion, 1861–1866 vol II. Akron, Werner co.
- Official roster of the soldiers of the state of Ohio in the War of the Rebellion, 1861–1866 vol III
- Official roster of the soldiers of the state of Ohio in the War of the Rebellion, 1861–1866 vol VI
- Official roster of the soldiers of the state of Ohio in the War of the Rebellion, 1861–1866, Vol VII
- Official roster of the soldiers of the state of Ohio in the War of the Rebellion, 1861–1866 vol IX
- Official roster of the soldiers of the state of Ohio in the War of the Rebellion, 1861–1866, Vol XI
- Official roster of the soldiers of the state of Ohio in the War of the Rebellion, 1861–1866, Vol XII
- Hall, Susan G. Appalachian Ohio and the Civil War, 1862–1863. Jefferson, North Carolina: McFarland & Company, Inc., 2008. ISBN 978-0-7864-3738-2.
- Lindsey, Thomas Jefferson (1903). Ohio at Shiloh: Report of the Commission. Ohio. Shiloh Battlefield Commission; C. J. Krehbiel & Company.
- Murdock, Eugene C. Ohio's Bounty System in the Civil War. Columbus, Ohio: Ohio State University Press, 1963.
- Reid, Whitlaw. Ohio in the War: Her Statesmen, Generals and Soldiers. Cincinnati, Ohio: 1868.
- Thomas, Dale. Civil War Soldiers of Greater Cleveland: Letters Home to Cuyshoga County. Charleston, South Carolina: The History Press, 2013. ISBN 978-1-62619-088-7.

=== Oregon ===
- Fletcher, Randol B. Hidden History of Civil War Oregon. Charleston, South Carolina: The History Press, 2011. ISBN 978-1-60949-424-7.

=== Pennsylvania ===
- Barcousky, Len. Civil War Pittsburgh: Forge of the Union. Charleston, South Carolina: The History Press, 2013. ISBN 978-1626190818.
- Blair, William and William Pencak, editors. Making and Remaking Pennsylvania's Civil War. University Park, Pennsylvania: Penn State University Press, 2004.
- Fox, Arthur B. Our Honored Dead: Alleghany County, Pennsylvania, in the American Civil War. Chicora, Pennsylvania: Mechling Bookbindery, 2008.
- Fox, Arthur B. Pittsburgh During the American Civil War 1860–1865. Chicora, Pennsylvania: Mechling Bookbindery, 2002.
- Greater Chambersburg Chamber of Commerce. Southern Revenge: Civil War History of Chambersburg, Pennsylvania. Chambersburg, Pennsylvania: Greater Chambersburg Chamber of Commerce, 1989.
- Miller, William J. The Training of an Army: Camp Curtin and the North's Civil War. Shippensburg, Pennsylvania: White Mane, 1990.
- Myers, Kathy. The Pennsylvania Wilds and the Civil War. The History Press, 2023. ISBN 978-1467153072.
- Sandou, Robert M. Deserter County: Civil War Opposition in the Pennsylvania Appalachians. Fordham University Press, 2009.
- Skinner, George W., ed. Pennsylvania at Chickamauga and Chattanooga: Ceremonies at the Dedication of the Monuments Erected by the Commonwealth of Pennsylvania. Harrisburg, Pennsylvania: Wm. Stanley Ray, State Printer, 1897.
- Taylor, Frank H. Philadelphia in the Civil War. Philadelphia, Pennsylvania: The city, 1913.
- Wingert, Cooper H. Harrisburg and the Civil War: Defending the Keystone of the Union. Charleston, South Carolina: The History Press, 2013. ISBN 978-1626190412.
- Young, Ronald C. Lancaster County, Pennsylvania in the Civil War. Lancaster, Pennsylvania: published by the author, 2003.

=== South Carolina ===
- Cauthen, Charles Edward. South Carolina Goes to War. Chapel Hill, North Carolina: University of North Carolina Press, 1956.
- Lee, J. Edward and Ron Chepesiuk, eds. South Carolina in the Civil War: The Confederate Experience in Letters and Diaries. Jefferson, North Carolina: McFarland & Company, Inc., 2004. ISBN 978-0-7864-2156-5.
- Poole, W. Scott. South Carolina's Civil War: A Narrative History. Macon, Georgia: Mercer University Press, 2005.
- Racine, Philip N. Living a Big War in a Small Place: Spartanburg, South Carolina, During the Confederacy. Columbia, South Carolina: University of South Carolina Press, 2013. ISBN 978-1-61117-297-3.
- Rosen, Robert N. Confederate Charleston: An Illustrated History of the City and the People During the Civil War. Columbia, South Carolina: University of South Carolina Press, 1995.
- Stokes, Karen. Confederate South Carolina: True Stories of Civilians, Soldiers and the War. The History Press, 2015. ISBN 978-1626198203.

=== Tennessee ===
- Ash, Steven V. Middle Tennessee Transformed, 1860–1870. Baton Rouge, Louisiana: Louisiana State University Press, 1988.
- Astor, Aaron. The Civil War along Tennessee's Cumberland Plateau. The History Press, 2015. ISBN 978-1626194045.
- Augustus, Gerald L. The Loudon County Area of East Tennessee in the War, 1861–1865. Paducah, Kentucky: Turner Publishing Company, 2000.
- Civil War Centennial Commission of Tennessee. Tennesseans in the Civil War: A Military History of Confederate and Union Units with Available Rosters of Personnel. In Two Parts. Nashville: Civil War Centennial Commission, 1964, 1965. Reprinted Knoxville: University of Tennessee Press, 1981, 1984. ISBN 0-87402-017-4.
- Connelly, Thomas L. Civil War Tennessee: Battles and Leaders. Knoxville: The University of Tennessee Press, 1979. ISBN 978-0-87049-261-7.
- Fisher, Noel C. War at Every Door: Partisan Politics & Guerilla Violence in East Tennessee, 1860–1869. Chapel Hill, North Carolina: University of North Carolina Press, 1997.
- Groce, W. Todd. Mountain Rebels: East Tennessee Confederates and the Civil War. Knoxville, Tennessee: University of Tennessee Press. ISBN 1-57233-093-7.
- Humes, Thomas W. The Loyal Mountaineers of Tennessee. Knoxville, Tennessee: Ogden Brothers and Company, 1888.
- Lepa, Jack H. The Civil War in Tennessee, 1862–1863. Jefferson, North Carolina: McFarland & Company, 2007.
- Maslowski Peter. Treason Must Be Made Odious: Military Occupation and Wartime Reconstruction in Nashville, Tennessee, 1862–65. 1978.
- Patton, James W. Unionism and Reconstruction in Tennessee, 1860–1867. Chapel Hill, North Carolina University of North Carolina Press, 1934.
- Seymour, Digby Gordon and David Richer. Divided Loyalties: Fort Sanders and the Civil War in East Tennessee. East Tennessee Historical Society, 1982.
- Sheeler, J. Reuben. "Secession and The Unionist Revolt," Journal of Negro History, Vol. 29, No. 2 (Apr., 1944), pp. 175–185 in JSTOR, covers east Tennessee
- Temple, Oliver. East Tennessee and the Civil War. Cincinnati, Ohio: The R. Clarke Company, 1899.

=== Texas ===
- Bell, Walter F. "Civil War Texas: A Review of the Historical Literature." Southwestern Historical Quarterly 109.2 (2005): 204–232. in JSTOR
- Baum, Dale. The Shattering of Texas Unionism: Politics in the Lone Star State during the Civil War Era. Baton Rouge, Louisiana: Louisiana State University Press, 1998.
- Buenger, Walter L. Secession and the Union in Texas. Austin, Texas: University of Texas Press, 1984.
- Burke, Johanna. The American Civil War in Texas. Rosen Publishing Group, 2010.
- Cotham, Edward Terrel. Battle on the Bay: The Civil War Struggle for Galveston. University of Texas Press, 1998.
- Cottrell, Steve. Civil War in Texas and New Mexico Territory. Gretna, Louisiana: Pelican Publishing Company, Inc., 1998. ISBN 1-56554-253-3.
- Gallaway, B.P., ed. Texas, The Dark Corner of the Confederacy: Contemporary Accounts of the Lone Star State in the Civil War. Lincoln, Nebraska: University of Nebraska Press, 1994.
- Grear, Charles David. Why Texans Fought in the Civil War. College Station, Texas: Texas A&M University Press, 2010.
- Grear, Charles David, editor. The Fate of Texas: The Civil War and the Lone Star State. Fayetteville, Arkansas: University of Arkansas Press, 2008.
- Hall, Andrew W. Civil War Blockade Running on the Texas Coast. Charleston, South Carolina: The History Press, 2014.
- Howell, Kenneth W., ed. The Seventh Star of the Confederacy: Texas in the Civil War. University of North Texas Press, 2009. excerpt
- Irby, James A. Backdoor at Bagdad: The Civil War on the Rio Grande. El Paso, Texas: Texas Western Press, 1977.
- Jewett, Clayton. Texas in the Confederacy: An Experiment in Nation Building. Columbia, Missouri: University of Missouri Press, 2002.
- Lawrence, F. Lee and Robert Glover. Camp Ford, C.S.A.: The Story of Union Prisoners in Texas. Austin, Texas: Texas Civil War Centennial Advisory Committee, 1964.
- Marten, James A. Texas Divided: Loyalty and Dissent in the Lone Star State, 1856–1874. Lexington, Kentucky: University Press of Kentucky, 1990.
- McCaslin, Richard B. Tainted Breeze: The Great Hanging at Gainesville, Texas, 1862. Baton Rouge, Louisiana: Louisiana State University Press, 1994.
- Pickering, David and Jud Falls. Bush Men and Vigilantes; Civil War Dissent in Texas. College Station, Texas: Texas A&M University Press, 2000.
- Schmidt, James M. Galveston and the Civil War: An Island City in the Maelstrom. Charleston, South Carolina: The History Press, 2012. ISBN 978-1609492830.
- Simpson, Hard B., ed. and Marcus J. Wright, comp. Texas in the Civil War, 1861–1865. Hillsboro, Texas: Hill Junior College Press, 1965
- Smith, David Paul. Frontier Defense in the Civil War: Texas' Rangers and Rebels. Texas A&M University Press, 1992. ISBN 0-89096-484-X.
- Spaw, Patsy M. The Texas Senate: Civil War to the Eve of Reform, 1861–1889, two volumes. College Station, Texas: Texas A&M University Press, 1999.
- Teja, Jesús F. de la. Lone Star Unionism, Dissent, and Resistance: Other Sides of Civil War Texas. 2016.
- Townsend, Stephen A. The Yankee Invasion of Texas Texas A&M University Press, 2006.
- Wilbarger, J.W. Indian Depredations in Texas. Austin, Texas: Hutchings Printing House, 1889.
- Winsor, Bill. Texas in the Confederacy: Military Installations, Economy, and People. Hillsboro, Texas: Hill Junior College Press, 1978.
- Wooster, Ralph A. Texas and Texans in the Civil War. Austin, Texas: Eakin Press, 1995.
- Wooster, Robert, and Ralph Wooster, eds. Lone Star Blue and Gray: Essays on Texas and the Civil War Texas A&M University Press, 2015.
- Wright, Marcus J., comp., and Harold B. Simpson, editor. Texas in the War, 1861–1865. Hillsboro, Texas: Hill Junior College Press, 1965.
- Young, Kevin R. To the Tyrants Never Yield: A Texas Civil War Sampler. Plano Texas: Wordware, 1992.

=== Utah Territory ===
- Long, E.B. The Saints and the Union: Utah Territory during the Civil War. Champaign, Illinois: University of Illinois Press, 1981.
- Maxwell, John Gary. The Civil War Years in Utah: The Kingdom of God and the Territory That Did Not Fight. 2016.

=== Vermont ===
- Benedict, George G. Vermont in the Civil War. Burlington, Vermont: Free Press Printing Co., 1908.
- Coffin, Howard. Full Duty: Vermonters in the Civil War. Woodstock, Vermont: The Countryman Press, Inc., 1993.
- Morgan, William Bennington and the Civil War. Charleston, South Carolina: The History Press, 2013. ISBN 978-1626191716.
- Watie, Otis F. R. Vermont in the Great Rebellion, Containing Historical and Biographical Sketches, Etc. Claremont, New Hampshire: Tracy, Chase & Co., 1869.
- Zeller, Paul G. Williamstown, Vermont in the Civil War. Charleston, South Carolina: The History Press, 2010. ISBN 978-1-59629-690-9.

=== Virginia ===
- Aubrecht, Michael. The Civil War in Spotsylvania County: Confederate Campfires at the Crossroads. Charleston, South Carolina: The History Press, 2009. ISBN 978-1596296961.
- Ayres, Edward L., Gary W. Gallagher and Andrew J. Torget, eds. Crucible of the Civil War: Virginia from Secession to Commemoration. Charlottesville, VA: University of Virginia Press, 2009. (Paperback) First published, 2006. ISBN 978-0-8139-2794-7.
- Barber, James G. Alexandria in the Civil War. Lynchburg, Virginia: H. E. Howard Co., 1988.
- Bearss, Edwin C. River of Lost Opportunities: The Civil War on the James River, 1861–1865. Lynchburg, Virginia: H.E. Howard, 1986.
- Bill, Alfred Hoyt. The Beleuguered City: Richmond, 1861 – 1865. New York: Knopf, 1946.
- Blair, William. Virginia's Private War: Feeding Body and Soul in the Confederacy, 1861–1865. New York: Oxford University Press, 1998.
- Brewer, James H. The Confederate Negro: Virginia's Craftsmen and Military Laborers, 1861–1865. Tuscaloosa, Alabama: University of Alabama Press, 2007.
- Brubaker, John H. The Last Capital: Danville, Virginia, and the Final Days of the Confederacy. Danville, Virginia: Danville Museum of Fine Arts and History, 1979.
- Cowgill, John A. The Great Schism: The Dividing of Virginia During the American Civil War. CreateSpace, 2011.
- Davis, Wiliam C. and James I. Robertson, Jr., eds. Virginia at War 1861. Lexington, Kentucky: University Press of Kentucky, 2005. ISBN 0-8131-2372-0.
- Davis, Wiliam C. and James I. Robertson, Jr., eds. Virginia at War 1862. Lexington, Kentucky: University Press of Kentucky, 2007. ISBN 978-0-8131-2428-5.
- Davis, Wiliam C. and James I. Robertson, Jr., eds. Virginia at War 1863. Lexington, Kentucky: University Press of Kentucky, 2009. ISBN 978-0-8131-2510-7.
- Davis, Wiliam C. and James I. Robertson, Jr., eds. Virginia at War 1864. Lexington, Kentucky: University Press of Kentucky, 2009. ISBN 978-0-8131-2562-6.
- Davis, Wiliam C. and James I. Robertson, Jr., eds. Virginia at War 1865. Lexington, Kentucky: University Press of Kentucky, 2012. ISBN 978-0-8131-3468-0.
- DeCredico, Mary A. Confederate Citadel: Richmond and Its People at War. University of Kentucky Press, 2020. ISBN 978-0813179254.
- Driver, Jr., Robert J. Lexington and Rockbridge County in the Civil War. Lynchburg, Virginia: H.E. Howard, 1989.
- Dubbs, Carol Kettenburg. Defend This Old Town: Williamsburg during the Civil War. Baton Rouge, Louisiana: Louisiana State University Press, 2002.
- Duncan, Richard B. Beleaguered Winchester: A Virginia Community at War, 1861–1865. Baton Rouge, Louisiana: Louisiana State University Press, 2007.
- Erickson, Alice Matthews. A Chronicle of Civil War Hampton, Virginia: Struggle and Rebirth on the Homefront. The History Press, 2014. ISBN 978-1626192256
- Furgurson, Ernest B. Ashes of Glory: Richmond at War. New York: Vintage Books, a division of Random House, 2000. ISBN 978-0-679-74660-7.
- Gage, Anthony J. Southside Virginia in the Civil War: Amelia, Brunswick, Charlotte, Halifax, Lunenburg, Mecklenburg, Nottoway & Prince Edward Counties. Lynchburg, Virginia: H.E. Howard, 1999.
- Gold, Thomas D. History of Clarke County, Virginia and Its Connection with the War Between the States. Berryville, Virginia: no publisher listed, 1914.
- Greene, A. Wilson. Civil War Petersburg: Confederate City in the Crucible of War. Charlottesville, Virginia: University of Virginia Press, 2006.
- Hearn, Chester G. Six Years of Hell: Harpers Ferry During the Civil War. Baton Rouge, Louisiana: Louisiana State University Press, 1996.
- Henderson, William D. Petersburg in the Civil War: War at the Door. Lynchburg, Virginia: H.E. Howard, 1998.
- Heuvel, Sean M. and Lisa L. Heuvel. The College of William and Mary in the Civil War. Jefferson, North Carolina: McFarland & Company, Inc., 2013. ISBN 978-0-7864-7309-0.
- Holsworth, Jerry W. Civil War Winchester. The History Press, 2011. ISBN 978-1609491611.
- Holsworth, Jerry. Stonewall Jackson and Winchester, Virginia. The History Press, 2012. ISBN 978-1609495305.
- Kleese, Richard B. Shenandoah County in the Civil War: The Turbulent Years. Lynchburg, Virginia: H. E. Howard, 1992.
- Krick, Robert K. Civil War Weather in Virginia. Tuscaloosa, Alabama: University of Alabama Press, 2007.
- Lankford, Nelson. Richmond Burning: The Last Days of the Confederate Capital. New York: Viking, 2002. ISBN 0-670-03117-8.
- McKnight, Brian D. Contested Borderland: The Civil War in Appalachian Kentucky and Virginia. University Press of Kentucky, 2006.
- Mahan, Michael G. The Shenandoah Valley, 1861–1865: The Destruction of the Granary of the Confederacy. Mechanicsburg, Pennsylvania: 1996.
- Manarin, Louis H., editor. Richmond at War: Minutes of the City Council 1861–1865. Chapel Hill, North Carolina: University of North Carolina Press, 1966.
- Marvel, William. A Place Called Appomattox. Chapel Hill, North Carolina: University of North Carolina Press, 2000.
- Mauro, Charles V. The Civil War in Fairfax County: Civilians and Soldiers. The History Press, 2006. ISBN 978-1596291485.
- Meserve, Stevan F. The Civil War in Loundoun County, Virginia. Charleston, South Carolina: The History Press, 2008.
- Morris, George S. and Susan L. Foutz. Lynchburg in the Civil War: The City – The People – The Battle. Lynchburg, Virginia: H. E. Howard, Inc., 1984.
- Muir, Dorothy. Mount Vernon: The Civil War Years. Mount Vernon, Virginia: Mount Vernon Ladies' Association, 1993.
- Musselman, Homer D. Stafford County in the Civil War. Lynchburg, Virginia: H.E. Howard, 1995.
- Noyalas, Jonathan A. Civil War Legacy in the Shenandoah: Remembrance, Reunion & Reconciliation. Charleston, South Carolina: The History Press, 2015. ISBN 978-1626198883.
- Noyalas, Jonathan A. Plagued by War: Winchester, Virginia, During the Civil War. Leesburg, Virginia: Gauley Mount Press, 2003.
- Philips, Edward H. The Lower Shenandoah Valley in the Civil War: The Impact of War Upon the Civilian Population and Upon Civil Institutions. Lynchburg, Virginia: H.E. Howard, 1993.
- Pond, George E. The Shenandoah in the Civil War. New York: Carles Scribner's Sons, 1883.
- Putnam, Sallie A. Richmond During the War. New York: G. W. Carleton, 1867.
- Quarles, Garland R. Occupied Winchester 1861–1865. Winchester, Virginia: Winchester–Frederick County Historical Society, 1991.
- Quarstein, John V. Hampton and Newport News in the Civil War: War Comes to the Peninsula. Lynchburg, Virginia: H.E. Howard, 1998.
- Quarstein, John V. The Civil War on the Virginia Peninsula. Arcadia Publishing, 1997.
- Riggs, David F. Embattled Shrine: Jamestown in the Civil War. Shippensburg, Pennsylvania: White Mane, 1997.
- Robertson, Jr., James I. Civil War Virginia: Battleground for a Nation. Charlottesville, Virginia: University Press of Virginia, 1991. ISBN 0-8139-1296-2.
- Shaffer, Michael K. Washington County, Virginia, in the Civil War. The History Press, 2012. ISBN 978-1609494957.
- Sharpe, Hal F. Shenandoah County in the Civil War: Four Dark Years. Charleston, South Carolina: The History Press, 2012. ISBN 978-1596297609.
- Thomas, Emory. The Confederate State of Richmond: A Biography of the Capital. Austin, Texas: University of Texas Press, 1971.
- Wallenstein, Peter and Bertram Wyatt-Brown, editors. Virginia's Civil War. Charlottesville, Virginia: University of Virginia Press, 2005.
- Williams, Jr., Richard G. Lexington, Virginia and the Civil War. Charleston, South Carolina: The History Press, 2013. ISBN 978-1609493912.
- Wilson, Greene A. Civil War Petersburg: Confederate City in the Crucible of War. Charlottesville, Virginia: University Press of Virginia, 2006.
- Woodward, Harold R. For Home and Honor: The Story of Madison County, Virginia, During the War Between the States, 1861–1865. H.R. Woodward, 1990.

=== West Virginia ===
- Cohen, Stan. The Civil War in West Virginia: A Pictorial History. Charleston, West Virginia: Pictorial Histories Publishing Company, 1995.
- Cook, Roy. Lewis County in the Civil War, 1861–1865. Charleston, West Virginia: Jerret Printing, 1924.
- Curry, Richard O. "A Reappraisal of Statehood Politics in West Virginia". The Journal of Southern History Vol. 28, No. 4. (November, 1962) pp. 403–421. in JSTOR
- Dickenson, Jack L. Wayne County, West Virginia in the Civil War. Huntington, West Virginia: published by the author, 2003.
- Graham, Michael B. The Coal River Valley in the Civil War: West Virginia Mountains, 1861. Charleston, South Carolina: The History Press, 2014. ISBN 978-1-62619-660-5.
- Matheny, Herman E. Wood County, West Virginia, in Civil War Times. Parkersburg, West Virginia: Trans–Allegheny Books, 1987.
- Snell, Mark A. West Virginia and the Civil War: Mountaineers Are Always Free. Charleston, South Carolina: The History Press, 2011. ISBN 978-1-59629-888-0.

=== Wisconsin ===
- Klement, Frank L. Wisconsin and the Civil War. Madison, Wisconsin: State Historical Society of Wisconsin, 1963.
- Larson, Ronald Paul. Wisconsin and the Civil War. The History Press, 2017. ISBN 978-1467137195.
- Love, William DeLoss. Wisconsin in the War of the Rebellion. Chicago, Illinois: Church and Goodman, 1866.
- Trask, Kerry A. Fire Within: A Civil War Narrative from Wisconsin. Kent, Ohio: Kent State University Press, 1995.
