= Forced into Glory =

2000 book by Lerone Bennett Jr.

Forced into Glory: Abraham Lincoln's White Dream
- First edition
- Author: Lerone Bennett Jr.
- Language: English
- Genre: Historical nonfiction
- Published: 2000
- Publisher: Johnson Publishing Company
- Publication place: United States
- Pages: 652
- ISBN: 0-87485-085-1

Forced into Glory: Abraham Lincoln's White Dream (2000) is a book written by Lerone Bennett Jr., an African-American scholar and historian, who served as the executive editor of Ebony for decades. It criticizes United States President Abraham Lincoln and claims that his reputation as the "Great Emancipator" during the American Civil War is undeserved.

== Content ==
In his introduction, Bennett writes:

[The] basic idea of the book is simple: Everything you think you know about Lincoln and race is wrong. Every schoolchild, for example, knows the story of "the great emancipator" who freed Negroes with a stroke of the pen out of the goodness of his heart. The real Lincoln ... was a conservative politician who said repeatedly that he believed in white supremacy. Not only that: He opposed the basic principle of the Emancipation Proclamation until his death and was literally forced – Count Adam Gurowski said he was literally whipped – "into the glory of having issued the Emancipation Proclamation," which Lincoln drafted in such a way that it did not in and of itself free a single slave.

The book is dedicated to those individuals whom Bennett calls "the real abolitionists", including Frederick Douglass, Thaddeus Stevens, and Wendell Phillips. In the dedication, he praises them for forcing Lincoln "into glory".

== Reception ==
Bennett's critics, including historians James M. McPherson and Eric Foner, as well as political scientist Lucas E. Morel, believe that he ignores Lincoln's political and moral growth during the course of the Civil War. They claim that Bennett oversimplifies the complexities of the period on issues of race when criticizing Lincoln. They also point out many direct errors and manipulations in the work, such as switching Lincoln's yes and no votes as senator, quoting out of context and presenting false numbers. Unlike Bennett, they conclude that Lincoln was instrumental in creating the framework that emancipated the slaves in the United States.

In a 2009 review of three newly published books on Lincoln, historian Brian Dirck referred to Bennett's 2000 work and linked him with Thomas DiLorenzo, another critic of Lincoln. He wrote that "Few Civil War scholars take Bennett and DiLorenzo seriously, pointing to their narrow political agenda and faulty research."

== See also ==
- The Real Lincoln
