= Lincoln Unmasked =

Book by Thomas DiLorenzo

Lincoln Unmasked: What You're Not Supposed to Know About Dishonest Abe
- Author: Thomas DiLorenzo
- Language: English
- Genre: Politics, American Civil War
- Publisher: Crown Forum
- Publication date: October 10, 2006
- Publication place: United States
- Media type: Hardcover, Paperback, ebook
- Pages: 224
- ISBN: 978-0-307-33841-9
- OCLC: 67727894
- Dewey Decimal: 973.7092 22
- LC Class: E457.2 .D55 2006
- Preceded by: The Real Lincoln: A New Look at Abraham Lincoln, His Agenda, and an Unnecessary War

Lincoln Unmasked: What You're Not Supposed to Know About Dishonest Abe is Thomas DiLorenzo's follow-up to The Real Lincoln, a book highly critical of the presidency of Abraham Lincoln.

== Synopsis ==
In his reappraisal of the famed president, DiLorenzo is highly critical of Lincoln. Within the book he argues that states within the union had the right at the time of the American Civil War to secede and that the more centralized government that emerged after the war was incompatible with democracy. DiLorenzo also claims that most scholars of the Civil War are biased in their approach to the history because, as DiLorenzo reminds the reader, "in war the victors get to write the history". Dilorenzo also argues that Lincoln was opposed to racial equality, and that many abolitionists, including Lysander Spooner, bitterly hated him.

== Reception ==
Reviewers of the book have concluded that while there is room for dispute on some aspects of Lincoln's presidency, DiLorenzo's work is flawed. One such critic was Justin Ewers, a senior editor at U.S. News & World Report, who reviewed the book for The Washington Post, and noted: "Of course, Lincoln's presidency had its dark side... Still, DiLorenzo's work is more of a diatribe against a mostly unnamed group of Lincoln scholars than a real historical analysis."

The review in Publishers Weekly called the book a "laughable screed," and suggested that DiLorenzo's main target was "scholars who dominate American universities (most notably Eric Foner)".
