= The Real Lincoln =

Book by Thomas DiLorenzo

The Real Lincoln: A New Look at Abraham Lincoln, His Agenda, and an Unnecessary War
- Author: Thomas J. DiLorenzo
- Subject: Biography, politics, American Civil War
- Genre: fiction
- Publisher: Crown Forum
- Publication date: 2002–2003
- Publication place: United States
- Media type: Print
- Pages: 346
- ISBN: 9780761536413
- OCLC: 48817846
- Followed by: Lincoln Unmasked

The Real Lincoln: A New Look at Abraham Lincoln, His Agenda, and an Unnecessary War is a biography of Abraham Lincoln written by Thomas J. DiLorenzo, a former professor of economics at Loyola University Maryland, in 2002. He was severely critical of Lincoln's United States presidency.

== Summary ==
DiLorenzo criticizes Lincoln for the suspension of habeas corpus, violations of the First Amendment, war crimes committed by generals in the American Civil War, and the expansion of government power. He argues that Lincoln's views on race exhibited forms of bigotry that are commonly overlooked today, such as belief in white racial superiority, against miscegenation, and even against black men being jurors. He says that Lincoln instigated the American Civil War not over slavery but rather to centralize power and to enforce the strongly protectionist Morrill Tariff; similarly, he criticizes Lincoln for his strong support of Henry Clay's American System economic plan. DiLorenzo regards Lincoln as the political and ideological heir of Alexander Hamilton, and contends that Lincoln achieved by the use of armed force the centralized state which Hamilton failed to create in the early years of the United States.

DiLorenzo's negative view of Lincoln is explicitly derived from his anarcho-capitalist views. He considers Lincoln to have opened the way to later instances of government involvement in the American economy, for example Franklin Roosevelt's New Deal, of which DiLorenzo strongly disapproves. DiLorenzo objects to historians who described Lincoln as having carried out "a capitalist revolution", since in DiLorenzo's view protectionist policies such as Lincoln strongly advocated and implemented "are not true Capitalism." In DiLorenzo's explicitly expressed view, only free trade. DiLorenzo declares protectionism and mercantilism to be one the same, using the two as interchangeable and frequently talking of "Lincoln's Mercantilist policies".

In the foreword to DiLorenzo's book, Walter E. Williams, a professor of economics at George Mason University, says that "Abraham Lincoln's direct statements indicated his support for slavery," and adds that he "defended slave owners' right to own their property" by supporting the Fugitive Slave Act of 1850.

== Reception ==
Herman Belz reviewed DiLorenzo's book together with Charles Adams's When in the Course of Human Events: Arguing the Case for Southern Secession, and claimed that it quoted Lincoln out of context, saying:

with respect to the books under review, there is a temptation for writers oblivious to the requirements of historical scholarship to treat Lincoln's speeches and writings as a polemical grab bag from which to select materials, abstracted from their historical context, that can be used to present Lincoln in an unfavorable light. Thomas J. DiLorenzo and Charles Adams, writing from the point of view that in academic economics is labeled anarcho-capitalist libertarianism, scavenge the documentary record in an attempt to show Lincoln as a revolutionary centralizer who used national sovereignty to establish corporate-mercantilist hegemony at the expense of genuine economic liberty.

He says they have a "simple-minded understanding of the relationship between politics and economics, between moral ends and productive entrepreneurial activity." He also noted that "these not very scholarly books" were of most interest for "their reflection of recent trends in Civil War historiography. Two developments stand out. The first is radicalization of the interrelated issues of slavery, civil rights, and race relations. The second development is a revival of interest in secession as a solution to the problem of government centralization."

Reviewing for The Independent Review, Richard M. Gamble noted that DiLorenzo's book "manages to raise fresh and morally probing questions" and that it "exposes Lincoln's embarrassing views on race, his ambition for economic nationalism, his rewriting of the history of the founding of the nation, his cavalier violation of constitutional limits on the presidency, and his willingness to wage a barbaric total war to achieve his ends". But, Gamble notes that The Real Lincoln "is seriously compromised by careless errors of fact, misuse of sources, and faulty documentation," which taken all together "constitute a near-fatal threat to DiLorenzo's credibility as a historian."

Gamble listed numerous fallacies of the book as follows: "Thomas Jefferson was not among the framers of the Constitution (pp. 69–70); Lincoln advised sending freed slaves to Liberia in a speech in 1854, not "during the war" (pp. 16–17); Lincoln was not a member of the Illinois state legislature in 1857 (p. 18); the Commerce Clause was not an "amendment,"; Thaddeus Stevens was a Pennsylvania representative, not a senator (p. 140); and Fort Sumter was not a customs house (p. 242)." Additionally: "In chapter 3, DiLorenzo claims that in a letter to Salmon P. Chase, Lincoln "admitted that the original [Emancipation] proclamation had no legal justification, except as a war measure" (p. 37). His source, however, is the recollections of a conversation (not a letter) that portrait artist Francis Bicknell Carpenter (not Chase) had with Lincoln, and at no point do these recollections sustain DiLorenzo's summary of them. Moreover, in the reference for this section, DiLorenzo misidentifies the title of his source as Paul Angle's The American Reader, when in fact the jumbled material comes from Angle's The Lincoln Reader." He also notes that DiLorenzo claims, for example, "that in the four years between 1860 and 1864, population in the thirteen largest Northern cities rose by 70 percent" (p. 225)." Gamble checks the source and finds it says that total rate of growth took place over 15 years.

Historian Brian Dirck said that few Civil War scholars take DiLorenzo seriously, pointing to his "narrow political agenda and faulty research".

Ken Masugi of the Claremont Institute wrote in National Review that "DiLorenzo frequently distorts the meaning of the primary sources he cites, Lincoln most of all." Masugi provides the following example:

Consider this inflammatory assertion: "Eliminating every last black person from American soil, Lincoln proclaimed, would be 'a glorious consummation.'" Compare the nuances and qualifications in what Lincoln actually said: "If as the friends of colonization hope, the present and coming generations of our countrymen shall by any means, succeed in freeing our land from the dangerous presence of slavery; and, at the same time, in restoring a captive people to their long-lost father-land, with bright prospects for the future; and this too, so gradually, that neither races nor individuals shall have suffered by the change, it will indeed be a glorious consummation." One need not be a Lincoln admirer to recognize that DiLorenzo is making an unfair characterization. DiLorenzo actually gets so overwrought that at one point he attributes to Lincoln racist views Lincoln was attacking.

Masugi further asserts that DiLorenzo failed to recognize "a disunited America might have become prey for the designs of European imperial powers, which would have put an end to the experiment in self-government."

DiLorenzo responded saying that Masugi was selective in his presentation about Lincoln and "relies entirely on a few of Lincoln's prettier speeches, ignoring his less attractive ones as well as his actual behavior." He concluded that Lincoln used his considerable rhetorical skills to camouflage his true intentions and mask his behavior.

Ken Whitefield noted that:

DiLorenzo enumerates various other 19th Century nations which abolished slavery without resorting to civil war – which is true. He points out that a small percentage of the money and resources spent on the Civil War would have sufficed to compensate all slave owners and provide land to all released slaves – and the numbers certainly back him up. But DiLorenzo also praises and idealizes the pre-1861 structure of the United States, as a confederation of virtually independent entities – each of which had a recognized right of secession of which it could make use, or threaten to use, at any time. What DiLorenzo persistently refuses to do is to link up these two issues - which were in reality very tightly bound up with each other. As even the most superficial student of pre-1861 American politics knows, there was no greater taboo than suggesting that the Federal government touch slavery in the South in any way or manner whatsoever. There was no way the South would have allowed any President or Congress to spend a single tax-payers' Dollar for compensating slave-owners. For much less than that they several times threatened to secede, for much less than that they finally did secede. In short - the reason why the US, alone of all slave-holding nations, needed to go through a terrible civil war in order to end slavery is that the system of entrenched States' Rights made it impossible to do it any other way. For the slaves to be free, Lincoln had to smash States' Rights by main force - there was no other way. True, in doing that Lincoln had various other agendas beside slavery, agendas which were more important to him than slavery; there can hardly be any debate on that, since Lincoln himself said so repeatedly at the time itself. Still, ultimately it was Lincoln who liberated the slaves. It was done in a terribly painful way, because the South had firmly blocked the less painful ways.

Writing in 2013 about DiLorenzo's book and the work of other "Lincoln haters", Rich Lowry said:

The anti-Lincolnites hate that the North instituted a progressive income tax; they never bother to complain that the Confederacy did the same. They hate that Lincoln suspended habeas corpus; they never note that Jefferson Davis did, too. They hate that the North resorted to a draft; they don't care that the Confederacy also had one. They hate that Lincoln fought a war against his countrymen; it evidently never occurs to them that Jefferson Davis shot back (let alone that he fired the first shot).

== See also ==
- Forced into Glory
