= Thomas DiLorenzo =

American economist (born 1954)

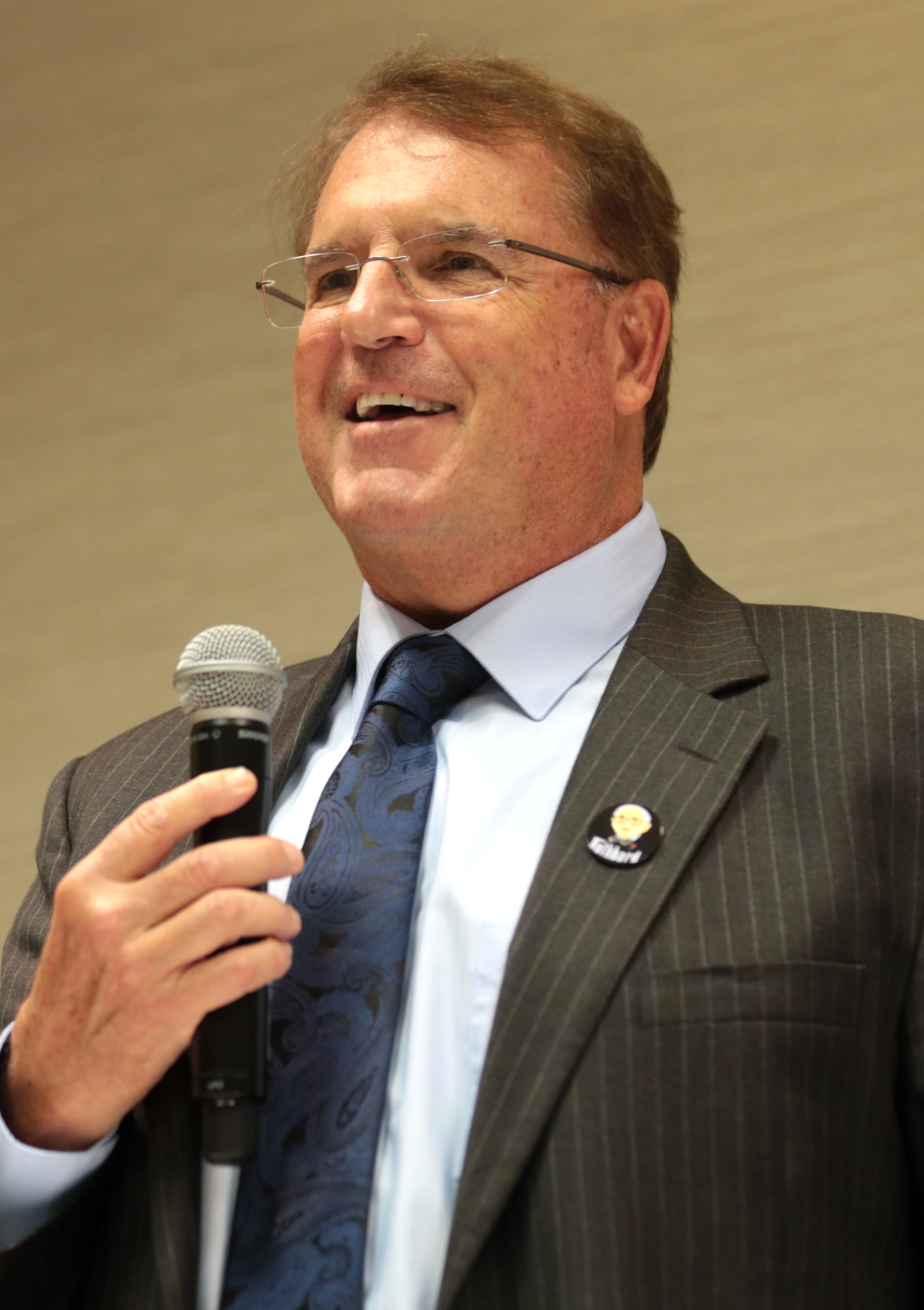
- DiLorenzo in 2017
- Born: August 8, 1954 (age 72)

Academic background
- Education: Westminster College (BA); Virginia Tech (PhD)
- Influences: Henry Hazlitt, John T. Flynn

Academic work
- Discipline: Economic history
- School or tradition: Austrian School

Signature
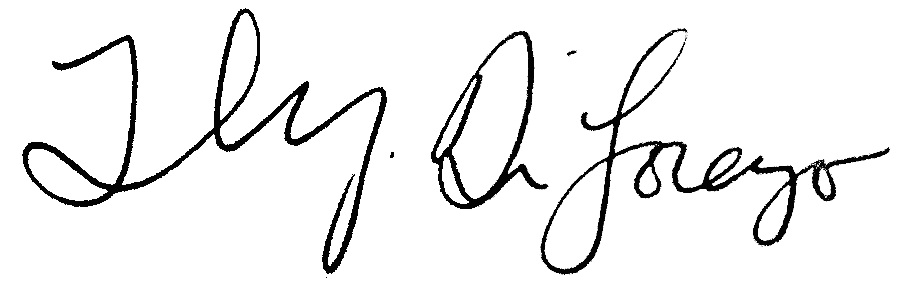

Thomas James DiLorenzo (/diləˈrɛnzoʊ/; born August 8, 1954) is an American author and former university economics professor who is the President of the Ludwig von Mises Institute. He has written books denouncing President Abraham Lincoln and is well known among economists for his work chronicling the history of antitrust policy in the United States.

He is a research fellow at The Independent Institute, Board of Advisors member at CFACT, and an associate of the Abbeville Institute. He identifies with the Austrian School of economics. He is an associated scholar at the white supremacist League of the South. He has spoken in favor of secession and has been described as an ally of, or part of, the neo-Confederate movement.

== Life and work ==
Thomas James DiLorenzo grew up in western Pennsylvania, descended from Italian immigrants. In an essay he attributed his individualism to playing sports. He began to study libertarianism in college.

He has a BA in economics from Westminster College in Pennsylvania. He holds a PhD in Economics from Virginia Tech.

DiLorenzo has taught at the State University of New York at Buffalo, George Mason University, and the University of Tennessee at Chattanooga.

He is a former adjunct fellow of the Center for the Study of American Business at Washington University in St. Louis. From 1992 to 2020, he was a professor of economics at Loyola University Maryland Sellinger School of Business. As of 2020, DiLorenzo was no longer listed as active faculty at Loyola University, and instead as a professor emeritus. He is a research fellow at the Independent Institute.

DiLorenzo is a speaker at Mises Institute events and teaches some of its online courses. He writes for the blog LewRockwell.com. He was listed as an affiliated scholar though 2009 of the Institute for the Study of Southern Culture, which is run by the League of the South, a neo-Confederate group. The Southern Poverty Law Center (SPLC) in 2004 described DiLorenzo as one of 10 key ideologues in the neo-Confederate movement.

== Views ==
DiLorenzo writes about what he calls "the myth of Lincoln" in American history and politics. He has said, "Lincoln is on record time after time rejecting the idea of racial equality. But whenever anyone brings this up, the Lincoln partisans go to the extreme to smear the bearer of bad news." DiLorenzo has spoken out in favor of the secession of the Confederate States of America, defending the right of these states to secede from an abolitionist perspective. He has described himself as a historical revisionist. He has called the American Civil War the "War for Southern Independence".

DiLorenzo is critical of Alexander Hamilton's financial views, the concept of "implied powers" in the Constitution, the existence of a federal bank, and the use of Keynesian economics to increase the national debt.

DiLorenzo is critical of neoconservatism and military interventionism.

DiLorenzo is critical of the Sherman Act, noting that "the Sherman Act was never intended to protect competition. It was a blatantly protectionist act designed to shield smaller and less efficient businesses from their larger competitors. There never was a golden age of antitrust."

DiLorenzo referred to Israel's response to Hamas for the attacks on October 7, as a genocide.

DiLorenzo is against The Pledge of Allegiance, in his essay Pledging Allegiance to the Omnipotent Lincolnian State, he argues The Pledge promotes a Post-Civil War Centralist ideology opposed to the Founding Fathers decentralized vision, and claims the ritual solely exists to foster loyalty to the federal government. DiLorenzo highlights The Pledge's writer Francis Bellamy’s socialist background, arguing the Pledge represents a step toward socialism.

DiLorenzo invokes this quote from Bellamy as an example of what he argues is a repudiation of Jeffersonian federalism and states’ rights.

The true reason for allegiance to the Flag is the "republic for which it stands." … And what does that vast thing, the Republic mean? It is the concise political word for the Nation — the One Nation which the Civil War was fought to prove. To make that One Nation idea clear, we must specify that it is indivisible, as Webster and Lincoln used to repeat in their great speeches.

== Books ==
DiLorenzo has written extensively on Abraham Lincoln. According to one historian, "Most historians are inclined to dismiss DiLorenzo as a crackpot. But... his books generally sell better than those of academic 'Lincolnologists' and... [his] views help lay the foundation for conservative political action today", historian David Blight has recently suggested that we ignore these writings at our peril."

DiLorenzo's book The Real Lincoln: A New Look at Abraham Lincoln, His Agenda, and an Unnecessary War is a critical biography published in 2002. Writing for The Daily Beast, Rich Lowry described DiLorenzo's technique in this book as the following: "His scholarship, such as it is, consists of rummaging through the record for anything he can find to damn Lincoln, stripping it of any nuance or context, and piling on pejorative adjectives. In DiLorenzo, the Lincoln-haters have found a champion with the judiciousness and the temperament they deserve."

In a review published by the Ludwig von Mises Institute, David Gordon described DiLorenzo's thesis: Lincoln was a "white supremacist" with no principled interest in abolishing slavery, and believed in a strong central government that imposed high tariffs and a nationalized banking system. He attributes the South's secession to Lincoln's economic policies rather than a desire to preserve slavery. Gordon quotes DiLorenzo: "slavery was already in sharp decline in the border states and the upper South generally, mostly for economic reasons".

Reviewing for The Independent Review, the magazine of The Independent Institute, a think tank associated with DiLorenzo, Richard M. Gamble of Palm Beach Atlantic University said that the book "manages to raise fresh and morally probing questions" and that DiLorenzo "writes primarily not as a defender of the Old South and its institutions, culture, and traditions, but as a libertarian enemy of the Leviathan state" but bemoans that DiLorenzo was "careless" in his handling of sources and despite his "evident courage and ability", his execution was lacking. Gamble concludes that the book is a "travesty of historical method and documentation". He said the book was plagued by a "labyrinth of [historical and grammatical] errors", and that DiLorenzo has "earned the... ridicule of his critics."

In a review for the Claremont Institute, historian Ken Masugi writes that "DiLorenzo adopts as his own the fundamental mistake of leftist multi-culturalist historians: confusing the issue of race with the much more fundamental one, which was slavery." He noted that in Illinois "the anti-slavery forces actually joined with racists to keep their state free of slavery, and also free of blacks." Masugi called DiLorenzo's work "shabby" and stated that DiLorenzo's treatment of Lincoln was "feckless" and that the book is "truly awful". In 2002, DiLorenzo debated Claremont Institute fellow professor Harry V. Jaffa on the merits of Abraham Lincoln's statesmanship before and during the Civil War.

DiLorenzo's book, Lincoln Unmasked: What You're Not Supposed to Know About Dishonest Abe (2007), continues his explorations begun in The Real Lincoln. Reviews in The Washington Post and Publishers Weekly both stated that the book seemed directed at unnamed scholars who had praised Lincoln's contributions. Justin Ewers criticized DiLorenzo, saying this book "is more of a diatribe against a mostly unnamed group of Lincoln scholars than a real historical analysis. His wild assertions – for example, that Lincoln held 'lifelong white supremacist views' – don't help his argument." Publishers Weekly described this as a "laughable screed," in which DiLorenzo "charges that most scholars of the Civil War are part of a 'Lincoln cult';" he particularly attacks scholar Eric Foner, characterizing him and others as "cover-up artists" and "propagandists". Ethan S. Rafuse wrote that Lincoln Unmasked "was characterized by one reviewer as 'like a monkey throwing feces in a zoo.' Review by John Deppen in Civil War News (January 2009)".

Writing for the Mises Institute that DiLorenzo leads, David Gordon summarises DiLorenzo's thesis: that Lincoln opposed the extension of slavery to new states because black labor would compete with white labor; that Lincoln hoped that all blacks would eventually be deported to Africa in order that white laborers could have more work. According to Gordon, DiLorenzo states that Lincoln supported emancipation of slaves only as a wartime expedient to help defeat the South.

In a 2009 review of three newly published books on Lincoln, historian Brian Dirck linked the earlier work of Thomas DiLorenzo with that of Lerone Bennett, another critic of Lincoln. He wrote that "Few Civil War scholars take Bennett and DiLorenzo seriously, pointing to their narrow political agenda and faulty research."

DiLorenzo's 2008 book Hamilton's Curse: How Jefferson's Arch Enemy Betrayed the American Revolution--and What It Means for Americans Today expands on DiLorenzo's libertarian, small government views and details ideological differences between "Hamiltonians" and "Jeffersonians" in the role of the central government.

== League of the South involvement ==
In 2009, Indiana University historian Carl R Weinberg wrote in the magazine of the Organization of American Historians that "DiLorenzo has also allied himself with the neo-Confederate League of the South, which shares his view that slavery had little to do with the Civil War and that 'big government' is the root of all evil."

Congressman Lacy Clay criticized DiLorenzo for his associations with the group when DiLorenzo testified before the House Financial Services Committee at the request of former U.S. Congressman Ron Paul in 2011. Washington Post columnist Dana Milbank noted that the League of the South had listed DiLorenzo on its Web site as an "affiliated scholar" as recently as 2008. Milbank also wrote that DiLorenzo had in 2010 told a secessionist Web site, DumpDC, that "secession is not only possible but necessary if any part of America is ever to be considered 'the land of the free' in any meaningful sense".

DiLorenzo denied any affiliation with the group, telling a Baltimore Sun reporter that "I don't endorse what they say and do any more than I endorse what Congress says and does because I spoke at a hearing on Wednesday." An investigation was subsequently conducted by his employer, but no action was taken. In a LewRockwell.com column, he described his association with the League as limited to "a few lectures on the economics of the Civil War" he gave to The League of the South Institute about thirteen years ago. In a 2005 LewRockwell.com article, DiLorenzo addressed concerns against the League of the South's core beliefs statement stating that neoconservative viewpoints were at odds with the League of the South's statement, leading to vitriol. Further, DiLorenzo argues that the current Republican party is descended, not from the small-government views of Jefferson, but rather from the ideals of the Hamiltonian Federalist Party.

== Publications ==
DiLorenzo has written several books, including:

- The Politically Incorrect Guide to Economics (2022) Regnery Publishing, ISBN 978-1684512980.
- The Problem with Lincoln (2020) Regnery History, ISBN 978-1684510184
- The Problem with Socialism (2016) Regnery Publishing, ISBN 978-1621575894.
- Organized Crime: The Unvarnished Truth About Government (2012). Ludwig von Mises Institute, ISBN 978-1610162562. OCLC 815625479
- Hamilton's Curse: How Jefferson's Arch Enemy Betrayed the American Revolution – and What It Means for Americans Today (2009). Random House, ISBN 978-0307382856. OCLC 593712801
- Lincoln Unmasked: What You're Not Supposed To Know about Dishonest Abe (2006). Random House, ISBN 978-0307338419. OCLC 67727894
- How Capitalism Saved America: The Untold History of Our Country, From the Pilgrims to the Present (2004). Random House, ISBN 9780761525264. OCLC 834478638, 56895316
- The Real Lincoln: A New Look at Abraham Lincoln, His Agenda, and an Unnecessary War (2003). Random House, ISBN 978-0761536413. OCLC 716369332
- From Pathology to Politics: Public Health in America, with James T. Bennett (2000). Transaction Publishers, ISBN 0765800233. OCLC 43978653
- The Food and Drink Police: America's Nannies, Busybodies, and Petty Tyrants with James T. Bennett (1998). Transaction Publishers, ISBN 978-1560003854. OCLC 60213705
- CancerScam: The Diversion of Federal Cancer Funds for Politics, with James T. Bennett (1997). Transaction Publishers, ISBN 978-1560003342. OCLC 59624748
- Underground Government: The Off-Budget Public Sector, with James T. Bennett (1983), Cato Institute, ISBN 978-0932790378. OCLC 9281695
