= William C. Harris (historian) =

American Civil War historian (born 1933)

- Education: University of Alabama
- Occupations: Author and Historian
- Writing career
- Subject: Civil War
- Notable awards: Lincoln Prize 2012

William C. Harris is Professor Emeritus of History at North Carolina State University. In 2012, he was co-winner of the 2012 Lincoln Prize for Lincoln and the Border States: Preserving the Union (shared with Elizabeth D. Leonard).

== Education ==
He began graduate school in 1958 at the University of Alabama.

== Career ==
Harris served in the U.S. Air Force before graduate school.

He is also on the Advisory Council of Ford's Theatre and serves on the Board of Advisors for Knox College's Lincoln Studies Center.

=== Awards ===
Harris's With Charity for All: Lincoln and the Restoration of the Union came in second place for the Lincoln Prize in 1998. He then received the Lincoln Diploma of Honor from the Lincoln Memorial University in 2003.

In 2008, Harris's writing was also awarded Henry Adams Prize offered by the Society for History in the Federal Government with his book Lincoln's Rise to the Presidency

Most notably, Harris was awarded the Gilder Lehrman Lincoln Prize in 2012.

== Publications ==
- Presidential Reconstruction in Mississippi. Baton Rouge, Louisiana State University [1967]. OCLC 647759
- The Day of the Carpetbagger: Republican Reconstruction in Mississippi. Baton Rouge: Louisiana State University Press, 1979. ISBN 9780807103661. OCLC 3915482
- William Woods Holden: firebrand of North Carolina politics. Baton Rouge: Louisiana State University Press, 1987. ISBN 9780807113257. OCLC 15109349
- With Charity for All: Lincoln and the Restoration of the Union. Lexington, Ky.: University Press of Kentucky, 1997. ISBN 9780813109718. OCLC 35574529
- Lincoln's Last Months. Cambridge, Mass.: Belknap Press of Harvard University Press, 2004. ISBN 9780674011991. OCLC 52858521
- Lincoln's Rise to the Presidency. Lawrence, Kan.: University Press of Kansas, 2007. ISBN 9780700615209. OCLC 77270665
- Lincoln and the Border States: Preserving the Union. Lawrence, Kan.: University Press of Kansas, 2011. ISBN 9780700618040. OCLC 714731538
- Lincoln and the Union Governors. Carbondale: Southern Illinois University Press, 2013. ISBN 9780809332885. OCLC 832706403
- Two Against Lincoln: Reverdy Johnson and Horatio Seymour, Champions of the Loyal Opposition. Lawrence, Kan.: University Press of Kansas, 2017. ISBN 978-0700624126. OCLC 963736321
