= Lerone Bennett Jr. =

American journalist and author (1928–2018)

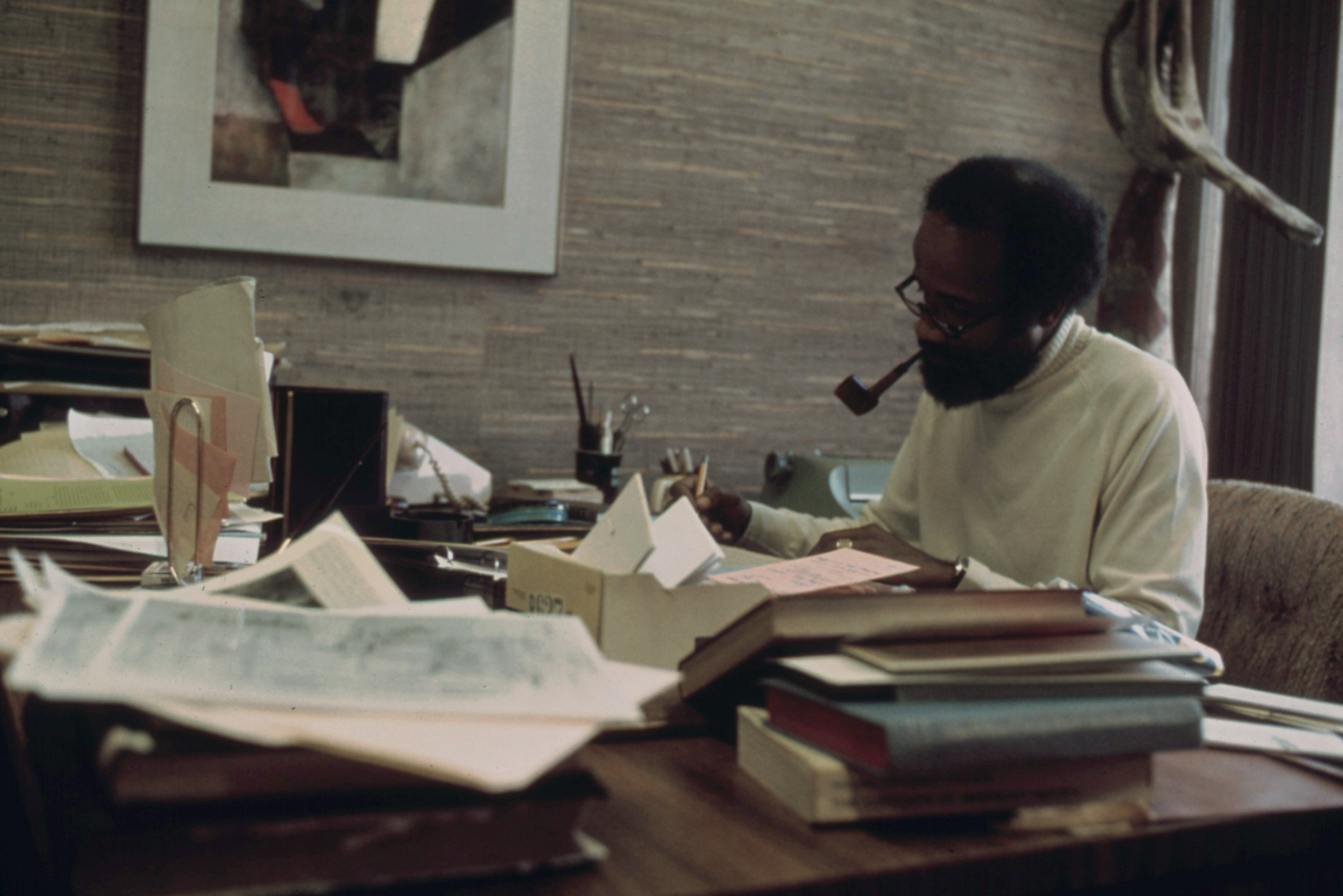
- Bennett in his office at Johnson Publishing Company headquarters, 1973. Photo by John H. White.
- Born: October 17, 1928; Clarksdale, Mississippi, U.S.
- Died: February 14, 2018 (aged 89); Chicago, Illinois, U.S.
- Occupations: Writer; author; scholar; social historian; journalist
- Years active: 1949–2018
- Known for: Before the Mayflower (1962); Forced into Glory (2000)
- Spouse: Gloria Sylvester (m. 1956; died 2009)
- Children: 4

Lerone Bennett Jr. (October 17, 1928 – February 14, 2018) was an African-American scholar, journalist, and social historian who analyzed race relations in the United States. His works include Before the Mayflower: A History of Black America, 1619–1962 (1962) and Forced into Glory: Abraham Lincoln's White Dream (2000), a book about U.S. President Abraham Lincoln.

Born and raised in Mississippi, Bennett graduated from Morehouse College. He served in the Korean War and began a career in journalism at the Atlanta Daily World before being recruited by Johnson Publishing Company to work for JET magazine. Later, Bennett was the long-time executive editor of Ebony magazine. He was associated with the publication for more than 50 years.

== Biography ==
=== Early life and education ===
Bennett was born in Clarksdale, Mississippi, on October 17, 1928, the son of Lerone Bennett Sr. and Alma Reed. When he was young, his family moved to Jackson, Mississippi. His father worked as a chauffeur and his mother was a maid; they divorced when he was a child. At twelve, he began writing for The Mississippi Enterprise, a local Black-owned paper, where he was introduced to the power of media in shaping public opinion on racial issues. His early work here would later influence his career as a journalist and historian.

He recalled once getting in trouble for being distracted from an errand when he happened upon a newspaper to read. He attended segregated schools as a child under the state system, and graduated from Lanier High School. Bennett attended Morehouse College in Atlanta, Georgia, where he was classmates with Martin Luther King Jr. Bennett later recalled that this period was integral to his intellectual development.

=== Career ===
Bennett served as a soldier during the Korean War and later pursued graduate studies. He worked as a journalist for the Atlanta Daily World from 1949 until 1953 and as city editor for JET magazine from 1952 to 1953. The magazine had been established in 1945 by John H. Johnson, who founded its parent magazine, Ebony, that same year. In 1953, Bennett became associate editor of Ebony magazine and then executive editor from 1958. The magazine served as his platform for the publication of a series of articles on African-American history some of which were collected and published as books.

Bennett wrote a 1954 article "Thomas Jefferson's Negro Grandchildren," reporting on the 20th-century lives of individuals claiming descent from Jefferson and his slave Sally Hemings. Bennett's article challenged conventional beliefs about Thomas Jefferson's relationship with Sally Hemings, bringing attention to African-American oral histories that had been largely overlooked. By exploring these claims, Bennett contributed to a deeper, more nuanced understanding of American history. This relationship was long denied by Jefferson's daughter and two of her children, and mainline historians relied on their account. But Bennett's reporting brought relevant Black oral histories into public view. New works published in the 1970s and 1990s further challenged the conventional story. Since a 1998 DNA study demonstrated a match between an Eston Hemings descendant and the Jefferson male line, the historic consensus has shifted (including the position of the Thomas Jefferson Foundation at Monticello) to acknowledging that Jefferson likely had a 38-year relationship with Hemings and fathered all six of her children of record, four of whom survived to adulthood.

External videos
- Booknotes interview with Bennett on Forced Into Glory, September 10, 2000, C-SPAN
- Panel discussion on Forced Into Glory, September 24, 2000, C-SPAN

Bennett served as a visiting professor of history at Northwestern University. He authored several books, including multiple histories of the African-American experience. These include his first work, Before the Mayflower: A History of Black America, 1619–1962 (1962), which discusses the contributions of African Americans in the United States from its earliest years. His 2000 book, Forced into Glory: Abraham Lincoln's White Dream, questions Abraham Lincoln's role as the "Great Emancipator". This last work was described by one reviewer as a "flawed mirror", and it was criticized by historians of the Civil War period, such as James McPherson and Eric Foner. Bennett is credited with the phrase: "Image Sees, Image Feels, Image Acts," meaning the images that people see influence how they feel, and ultimately how they act.

A longtime resident of Kenwood, Chicago, Bennett died of complications from vascular dementia at his home there on February 14, 2018, at age 89.

== Personal life ==
A Catholic, Bennett married Gloria Sylvester (1930–2009) on July 21, 1956, at St. Columbanus Church in Chicago. They met while working together at JET. The couple had four children: Alma Joy, Constance, Courtney, and Lerone III (1960–2013).

== Legacy and honors ==
- 2003 – Carter G. Woodson Lifetime Achievement Award from Association for the Study of African American Life and History
- 1978 – Literature Award of the American Academy of Arts and Letters
- 1965 – Patron Saints Award from the Society of Midland Authors
- 1963 – Book of the Year Award from Capital Press Club
- 1982 – Candace Award from the National Coalition of 100 Black Women
- Honorary degrees from Morehouse College, Wilberforce University, Marquette University, Voorhees College, Morgan State University, University of Illinois, Lincoln College, and Dillard University.

== Bibliography ==
- Before the Mayflower: A History of Black America, 1619–1962 (1962)
- What Manner of Man: A Biography of Martin Luther King, Jr. (1964)
- Confrontation: Black and White (1965)
- Black Power U.S.A.: The Human Side of Reconstruction 1867–1877 (1967)
- Pioneers In Protest: Black Power U.S.A. (1968)
- The Challenge of Blackness (1972)
- The Shaping of Black America (1975)
- Wade in the Water: Great Moments in Black History (1979)
- Forced into Glory: Abraham Lincoln's White Dream (2000), Chicago: Johnson Pub. Co. (review by Eric Foner)
