= The Crooked Path to Abolition: Abraham Lincoln and the Antislavery Constitution =

2021 book by James Oakes

- First edition
- Author: James Oakes
- Publisher: W. W. Norton & Company
- Publication date: 2021
- Media type: Print (hardback)
- ISBN: 978-1-324-00585-8

The Crooked Path to Abolition: Abraham Lincoln and the Antislavery Constitution is a non-fiction book by James Oakes published in 2021 by W. W. Norton & Company.

The book is the last in a trilogy of histories by Oakes dealing with anti-slavery constitutionism, including Freedom National (2013) and The Scorpion’s Sting (2014).

Oakes examines the development of anti-slavery constitutionalism, whose political advocates detected in the Constitution of the United States principles and antecedents that challenged a long-held proslavery interpretation of the document.

The Crooked Path to Abolition was named a finalist for the Lincoln Prize and won the 2021 Harold Holzer Book Prize from The Lincoln Forum.

== Contents ==
PREFACE

- "That Glorious Fabric of Collected Wisdom": A Brief History of the Antislavery Constitution
- "Freedom Is the Rule, Slavery Is the Exception": The Emergence of Antislavery Constitutionalism
- The Antislavery Project: Lincoln and Antislavery Politics
- "My Ancient Faith": Lincoln, Race, and the Antislavery Constitution
- The Forfeiture of Rights: Emancipation before the Proclamation
- "A King's Cure": Lincoln and the Origins of the Thirteenth Amendment

== Reviews ==
In Oakes's view, antislavery constitutionalism constituted the foundations of the ideology underlying political battles against slavery, and he takes seriously the prolonged, fiercely contested construction of this constitutional tradition as a significant political force in the fight for abolition.—Historian Joseph Rathke in Journal of the Illinois State Historical Society, Summer/Fall 2022.

Professor Gordon S. Wood called The Crooked Path to Abolition "a very solid, carefully and rigorously argued book."

Historian Joseph Rathke, writing in the Journal of the Illinois State Historical Society, summarizes the central theme of The Crooked Path to Abolition:

His significant contribution is not in his recovery of Lincoln's character; indeed, he acknowledges extensively the limitations of Lincoln's ideological commitment to racial equality. Rather, he shows that Lincoln's dedication to emancipation emerged from a complex political tradition that was powerfully committed to the end of slavery.

Allen C. Guelzo wrote in the Claremont Review of Books:

What must impress any reader of The Crooked Path to Abolition is the consistency with which an anti-slavery constitutionalism was developed and applied from the very first. Slavery was not killed by overturning the Constitution and starting over again with the Reconstruction amendments, in the manner touted by Bruce Ackerman, Eric Foner, David Blight, and George Fletcher; it was strangled by relentlessly applying the logic the Constitution already contained....

== See also ==
- Abraham Lincoln
- Slavery and the United States Constitution
- Abolitionism in the United States
- Thirteenth Amendment to the United States Constitution

== Sources ==
- Guelzo, Allen C. "The Antislavery Project: Abraham Lincoln and the anti-slavery movement". Claremont Review of Books, Spring 2021.
- Kreitner, Richard. 2021. "Did the Constitution Pave the Way to Emancipation?" The Nation, October 6, 2021.
- Oakes, James. 2021. The Crooked Path to Abolition: Abraham Lincoln and the Antislavery Constitution. W. W. Norton & Company, New York. ISBN 978-1-324-00585-8
- Rathke, Joseph. 2022. Review: "The Crooked Path to Abolition: Abraham Lincoln and the Antislavery Constitution by James Oakes." Journal of the Illinois State Historical Society, Summer/Fall 2022, Vol. 115, No. 2/3, pp. 196-198.
- Wood, Gordon S. 2021. "Was the Constitution a Pro-Slavery Document?" The New York Times, January 12, 2021.
