= Freedom National: The Destruction of Slavery in the United States, 1861-1865 =

2013 book by James Oakes

- First edition
- Author: James Oakes
- Publisher: W. W. Norton & Company
- Publication date: 2013
- Media type: Print (hardback)
- Pages: 395
- ISBN: 978-0393065312

Freedom National: The Destruction of Slavery in the United States, 1861-1865 is a non-fiction book by James Oakes published in 2013 by W. W. Norton & Company. The book is the first in a trilogy of histories by Oakes dealing with anti-slavery constitutionalism, followed by The Scorpion’s Sting (2014) and The Crooked Path to Abolition (2021).

Freedom National offers a reinterpretation of the Republican Party's antislavery policies with respect to the Union army. Rather than emerging inadvertently through the vicissitudes of war to preserve the Union, Oakes argues that military emancipation was already understood among political abolitionists to be a constitutionally legitimate method to attack slavery if civil conflict arose.

Oakes rejects the characterization of Abraham Lincoln as "the reluctant emancipator" and places the destruction of slavery as the ultimate object of Republican policy in the earliest weeks of the war.

Freedom National won the 2013 Lincoln Prize.

== Contents ==
Preface
Maps

- "ULTIMATE EXTINCTION"
- "DISUNION IS ABOLITION"
- "FULFILLMENT OF THE PROPHESIES"
- "AUGUST 8, 1861: EMANCIPATION BEGINS"
- "THE BORDER STATES"
- "SELF-EMANCIPATION"
- "BY THE ACT OF CONGRESS THEY ARE CLEARLY FREE"
- "A CORDON OF FREEDOM"
- "THE 'PRELIMINARY' PROCLAMATION"
- "THE EMANCIPATION PROCLAMATION"
- "THE SYSTEM YET LIVES"
- "OUR FATHERS WERE MISTAKEN"
- Epilogue: Was Freedom Enough?

== Reviews ==
Writing in the Journal of the Abraham Lincoln Association, Professor George C. Rable extols Oakes's "superb analysis" and "fine writing," and predicts that Freedom National "will undoubtedly have lasting influence on studies of slavery, Lincoln, and the Civil War." Rable doubts whether Oakes's explication of the methods by which Republicans expected to peacefully bring about the "ulitimate extinction" of slavery were fully grasped by Lincoln's leading contemporaries.

Michael Burlingame in the Claremont Review of Books writes: "Oakes's book—based on extensive research in primary and secondary sources, [is] forcefully written, and convincingly argued." Burlington registers one caveat: "The book's only questionable conclusion comes in Oakes's discussion of the secession crisis: there was more Republican support for compromise than he allows."

Historian Ryan W. Keating writes in the Indiana Magazine of History: "In all an excellent contribution to our understanding of the ideological motivations of northerners." Keating takes issue with Oakes's "top-down analysis" that he feels "downplays the importance of local opposition to federal policy, depending instead on broad statements about the ideological tenets of Republicanism and Democratic opposition" and his failure to address "how ideology played into the actions of men in the ranks." Keating adds that "addressing the nuances of dissent would have been impractical within the framework of this project...."

== Sources ==
- Burlingame, Michael. 2013. "The Great Emancipator: A review of Freedom National: The Destruction of Slavery in the United States, 1861-1865, by James Oakes" Claremont Review of Books, Vol. XIII, Number 3. Summer 2013. Accessed 10 June, 2026.
- Foner, Eric. 1970. Free Soil, Free Labor, Free Men: The Ideology of the Republican Party Before the Civil War. Oxford University Press, London, New York. ISBN 0-19-501352-2
- Keating, Ryan W. 2014. Review: "Freedom National: The Destruction of Slavery in the United States, 1861–1865 by James Oakes"” Indiana University Press. pp. 79-81. Accessed 11 June, 2026.
- Kreitner, Richard. 2021. "Did the Constitution Pave the Way to Emancipation?" The Nation, October 6, 2021. Accessed 11 June, 2026.
- Oakes, James. 2013. Freedom National: The Destruction of Slavery in the United States, 1861-1865. W. W. Norton & Company, New York. ISBN 978-0393065312.
- Rable, George C. 2014. Review: "Freedom National: The Destruction of Slavery in the United States, 1861—1865 by James Oakes" Journal of the Abraham Lincoln Association, SUMMER 2014, Vol. 35, No. 2, pp. 80-84. Accessed 10 June, 2026.
