= Commemoration of the American Civil War =

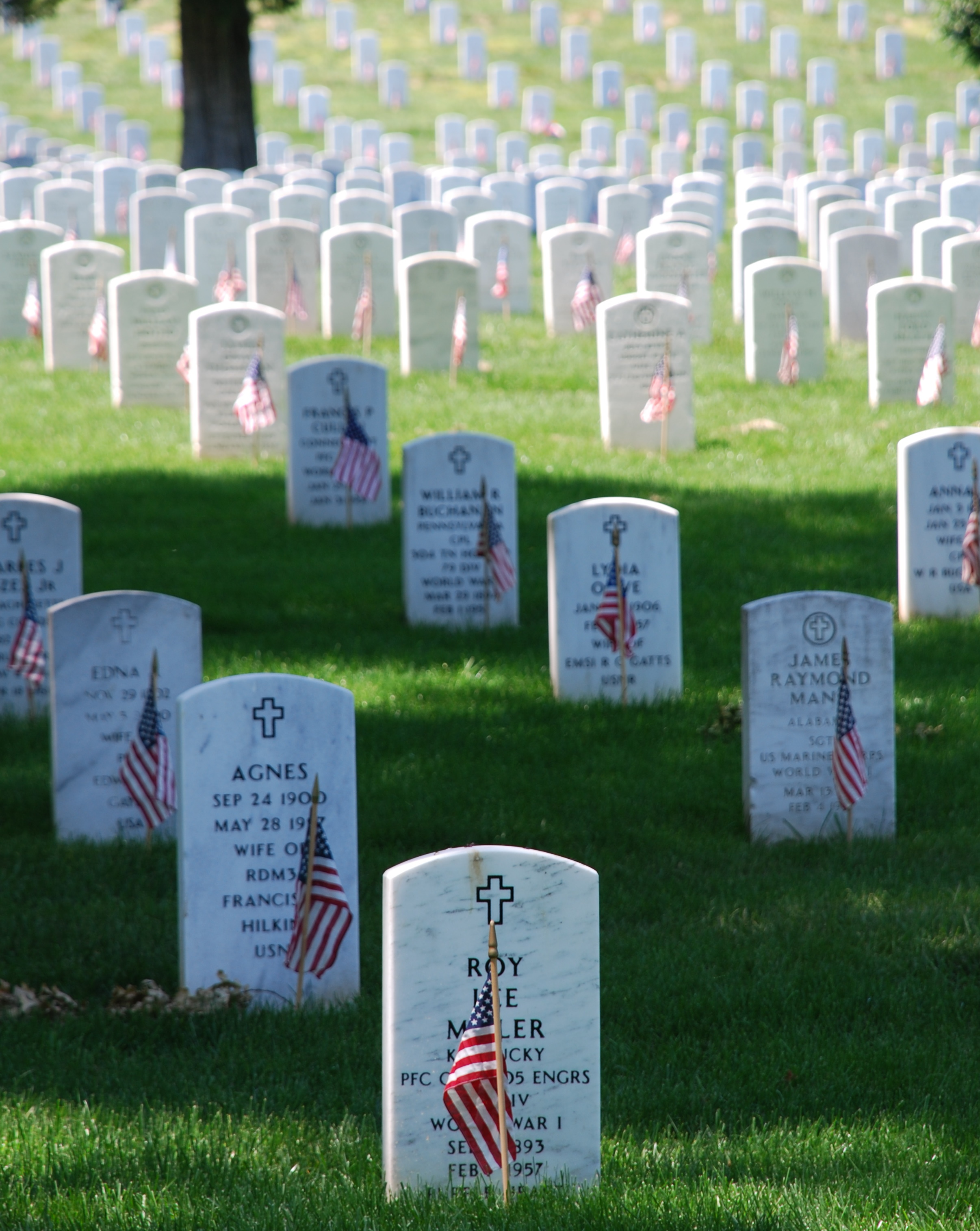
Flags decorate the graves at Arlington National Cemetery on Memorial Day

The commemoration of the American Civil War is based on the memories of the Civil War that Americans have shaped according to their political, social and cultural circumstances and needs, starting with the Gettysburg Address and the dedication of the Gettysburg cemetery in 1863. Confederates, both veterans and women, were especially active in forging the myth of the Lost Cause of the Confederacy.

The five major Civil War battlefield parks operated by the National Park Service (Gettysburg, Antietam, Shiloh, Chickamauga/Chattanooga and Vicksburg) had a combined 3.1 million visitors in 2018, down 70% from 10.2 million in 1970. Attendance at Gettysburg in 2018 was 950,000, a decline of 86% since 1970.

== Memorial Day ==
Most of the war dead are buried at Arlington National Cemetery and other national cemeteries near the battle zones. Memorial Day (or "Decoration Day") originated shortly after the American Civil War to commemorate the Union and Confederate soldiers who died in the Civil War. The Confederates set up a different day at first but then merged it into the national holiday. By the 20th century, Memorial Day had been extended to honor all Americans who have died while in the military service.

== Lost Cause of the Confederacy ==
The Lost Cause is the literary and intellectual movement that sought to reconcile the traditional white society of the South to the defeat of their new nation. Gary W. Gallagher and military historian Alan T. Nolan say:

The architects of the Lost Cause acted from various motives. They collectively sought to justify their own actions and allow themselves and other former Confederates to find something positive in all-encompassing failure. They also wanted to provide their children and future generations of white Southerners with a 'correct' narrative of the war.

== Grant's Tomb ==
The death of General Ulysses S. Grant in 1885 was the occasion for commemoration. A funeral train carried the body to New York City, where a quarter of a million people viewed in the two days prior to the funeral. His pallbearers included Union Generals William Tecumseh Sherman and Philip Sheridan, Confederate Generals Simon Bolivar Buckner and Joseph E. Johnston, Admiral David Dixon Porter, and John A. Logan, the head of the GAR. His body was laid to rest in the General Grant National Memorial ("Grant's Tomb"), the largest mausoleum in North America. Attendance at the New York funeral topped 1.5 million. Ceremonies were held in other major cities around the country.

== Gettysburg Battlefield ==
The Gettysburg battlefield, dedicated by President Lincoln who presented his iconic Gettysburg Address there in November 1863, contains hundreds of memorials to the regiments that fought there. Army veterans created the Gettysburg Battlefield Memorial Association in 1864, making it one of the earliest historic preservation organizations in the U.S. The battlefield is under the control of the national park Service and is a major tourist destination.

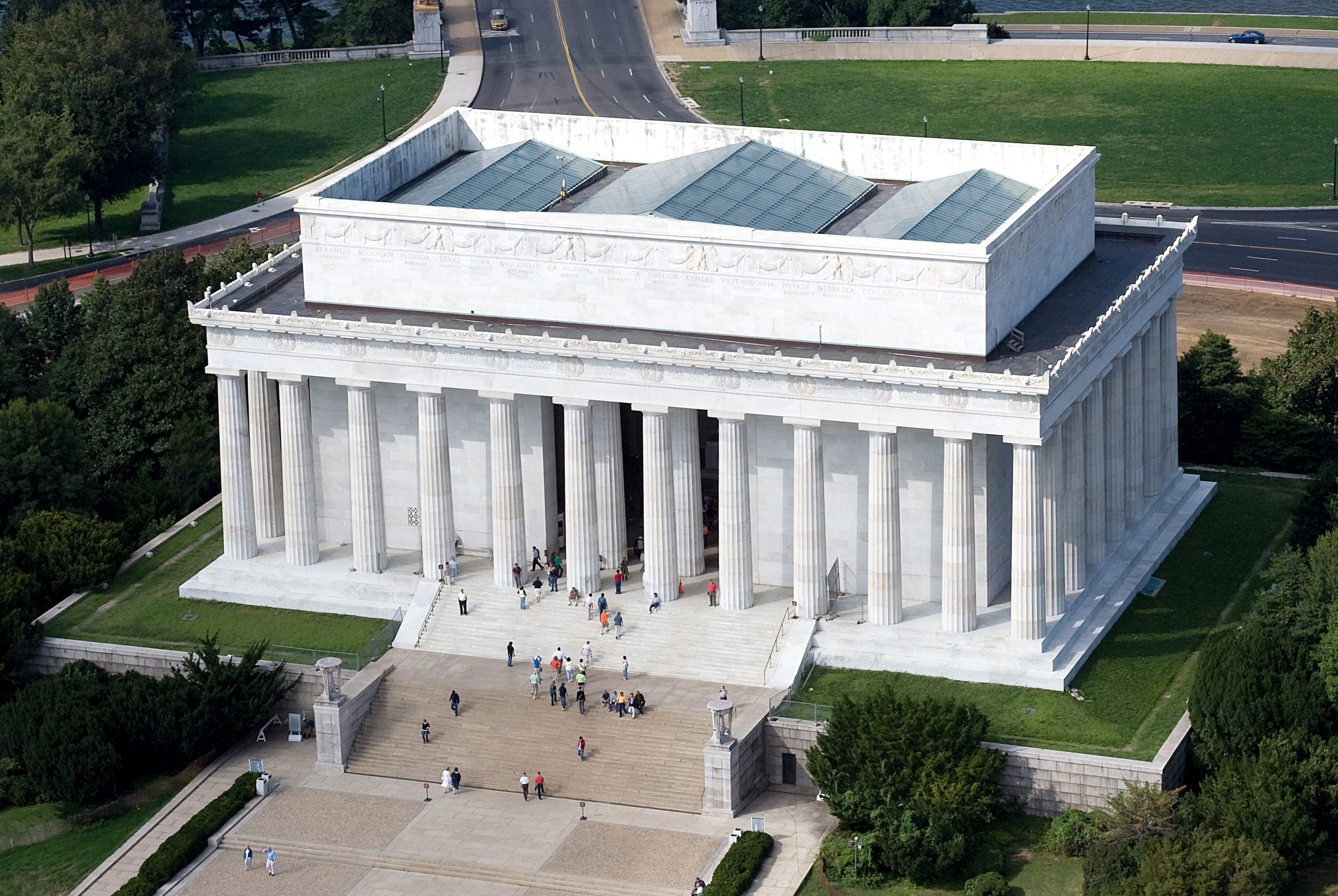
Lincoln Memorial in Washington

== Lincoln Memorial ==
The Lincoln Memorial in Washington was dedicated in 1922. It has become one of the most visited war memorials. It has been the site of many famous celebrations of freedom, most notably Marian Anderson's 1939 Concert and Martin Luther King Jr.'s 1963 "I Have a Dream" speech.

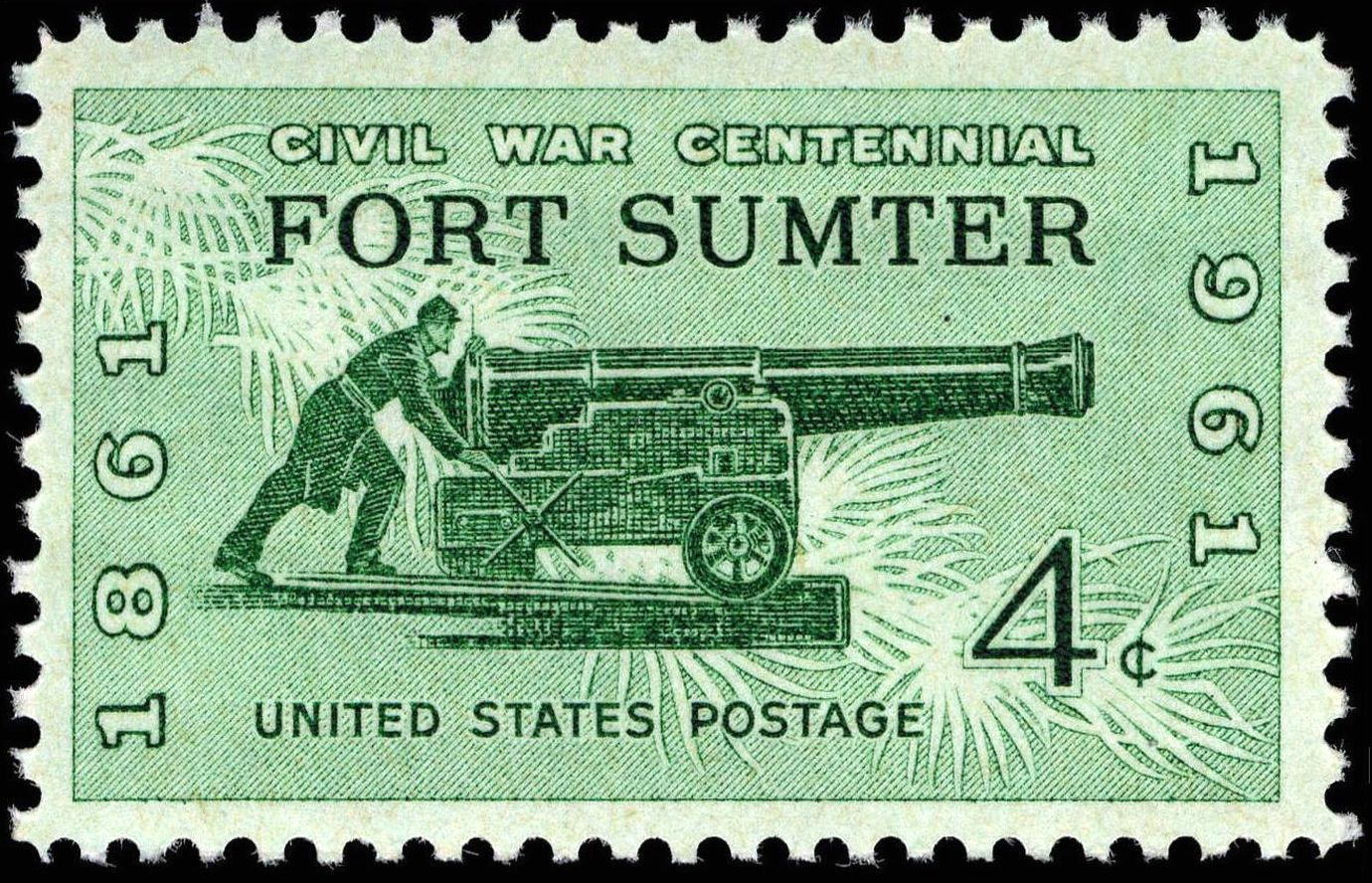
A 1961 Civil War Centennial postage stamp depicts a cannon and its gunner.

== American Civil War Centennial (100) ==
The shadow of ongoing conflict during the Civil Rights Movement affected implementation of the 100-year commemorative activities. Neither Congress nor President Dwight D. Eisenhower were interested in a risking debate over single, unified, national theme for the commemoration, so the official interpretive work was carried out by the various state commissions.

At the national Commission, key members urged different priorities. Emory University Professor Bell I. Wiley recommended a major effort to document and preserving information from historic letters, newspapers and public documents. Ulysses S. Grant III, the first chairman, wanted to emphasize large-scale events that appealed to the public, such as "sham battles" or reenactments. Businessman Karl Betts, the first executive director of the commission, looked for ways it could spur economic development. They all agreed on a Cold War consensus to the effect that all good Americans were ideologically united, with the result that potentially divisive civil rights issues were not emphasized. The National Park Service was in overall charge; it wanted Congress to appropriate more money to re-landscape and interpret major battlefields along traditional lines. The Post Office issued a series of noncontroversial commemorative stamps to mark the centennial.

The state commissions took a sectional perspective, using different key words and phrases to reflect their viewpoints, and sponsored and encouraged different public memorials and activities. Segregation was still in effect but it was under heavy attack by the Civil Rights Movement. The Southern states presented their official view that the infrastructure of Jim Crow and segregation was an organic reflection of a distinctive Southern "way of life." Many white Southerners responded with enthusiasm to invitations to celebrate their heritage, which they saw as one of courage on the battlefield and continuity afterwards. For the first time, many Americans, especially white Southerners, volunteered or were recruited into historical reenactment groups that performed pageants and re-creations of Civil War battles, field maneuvers, and encampments.

== Civil War Sesquicentennial (150) ==
2011 marked the 150th anniversary of the beginning of the American Civil War. Many in the American South attempted to incorporate both black history and white perspectives. A Harris Poll given in March 2011 suggested that Americans were still uniquely divided over the results and appropriate memorials to acknowledge the occasion. While traditionally American films of the Civil War feature "brother versus brother" themes, film treatments of the war are evolving to include African American characters. Benard Simelton, president of the Alabama NAACP, said celebrating the Civil War is like celebrating the "Holocaust". In reference to slavery, Simelton said that black "rights were taken away" and that blacks "were treated as less than human beings."

=== Governmental support ===
==== National Park Service ====
Acknowledging the need for an internet presence, the National Park Service launched a website about the 150th anniversary and Civil War history featuring a list of NPS events, as well as creating several digital humanities projects. These projects included databases of soldiers, cemeteries, and Medals of Honor awarded; an interactive time line of Civil War events, and a Twitter account featuring the daily accounts of a fictional Civil War newspaper reporter. The NPS and local governments hoped that the sesquicentennial would increase visitation to Civil War battlefield site, and generate revenue. Spotsylvania County made about $68,000 off of the special events for the Battle of Chancellorsville, which it considered insufficient, considering the effort.

In honor of the 150th anniversary, the exhibits at the Chancellorsville Visitors Center got a $1.6 million upgrade. The original Visitors Center was originally completed to coincide with both the 100th anniversary of the Civil War and the 50th anniversary of the birth of the National Park Service. The new exhibit will reflect current research and scholarship. The National Park Service intends to create a contemplative space focusing on the sacrifices of those that fought in the war.

Several park superintendents have been awarded the Appleman-Jude-Lewis Award for their efforts in commemorating the 150th anniversary of the American Civil War. Eight park service employees received the award, recognizing their work in "preserving the nation's cultural resources"

The National Park Service's social media team was commended by a local newspaper for their photojournalism coverage of the Battle of Chancellorsville.

==== Federal funding and grants ====
In spite of the ongoing popularity of the war, there is no national commission to commemorate this sesquicentennial. The Civil War Sesquicentennial Commission Act, from the 107th, 108th, 109th 110th, 111th, 112th Congress all died in committee after being sent for review from other sub/committees. What all these acts have in common for the Civil War Sesquicentennial was to establish a commission to commemorate the sesquicentennial of the American Civil War, and a grant program. This Grant program would have appropriated $3,500,000.00 to the National Endowment for the Humanities (NEH) for grants for activities relating to the Sesquicentennial Civil War, but NEH is not directly sponsoring any Sesquicentennial projects. State humanities councils may sponsor their own sesquicentennial activities, partly using unrestricted funds that are given to each state by NEH.

===== NPS federal funding =====
National Park Service Budget Justification does not include any direct federal funding for the Civil War Sesquicentennial from FY 2008 through FY 2014. FY 2014 budget of $2.6 Billion, FY 2013 budget of $2.6 Billion, FY 2012 budget of $2.9 billion, FY 2011 budget of $2.7 billion, FY 2010 budget of $2.7 billion, FY 2008 budget of $2.364 billion, FY 2007 budget of $2.156 billion, FY 2006 budget of $2.249 billion.

===== Civil War Battlefield Preservation Program (CWBPP) =====
The Civil War Battlefield Preservation Program (established 1999) utilizes government matching grants and private funds to permanently protect Civil War battlefields that are not within national park boundaries. When the Interior Appropriations bill for FY 2010 is passed later this week it will include $9 million for the federal Civil War Battlefield Preservation Program (CWBPP). This money, the largest single-year allocation the program has ever received, will come from the federal Land and Water Conservation Fund (LWCF). Grants totaling $10 million a year are authorized through 2013 (as per the 2009 A BPP authorization (16 U.S.C 46 9k–1)).

==== State funding and grants ====
Arkansas

The Arkansas Civil War Sesquicentennial Commission has established a matching fund grant program for up to $2,000.00 for local commemoration of the Civil War in Arkansas.

Connecticut

The Connecticut Civil War Commemoration Commission does not have a grant program, but does have a list of organizational Partners.

Delaware

The Civil War Sesquicentennial Planning Committee & Delaware Heritage Commission show no direct grants or funding for the Civil War Sesquicentennial.

Georgia

Georgia's Civil War Sesquicentennial website was created by the Tourism Division of the Georgia Department of Economic Development as part of the state's efforts to commemorate the 150th anniversary of the Civil War. This website does not talk about any grant program, but does have a partner website.

Illinois

The Illinois Civil War 150th Anniversary lists grant making partners but does not show a specific funding or grant program directly for the Civil War Sesquicentennial.

Iowa

The Iowa Civil War Sesquicentennial Committee website does not show any funding or grant program directly for the Civil War Sesquicentennial.

Kentucky

The Kentucky Civil War Sesquicentennial Commission is creating Civil War heritage tourism development opportunities, educating students, training teachers, developing initiatives for new scholarship and encouraging events and activities across the commonwealth, but does not show any funding or grant program directly for the Civil War Sesquicentennial.

Maine

The Maine Civil War Sesquicentennial site is hard to navigate and no signs of any funding or grant program directly for the Civil War Sesquicentennial.

Maryland

Civil War Sesquicentennial Resources site gives no signs of any funding or grant program directly for the Civil War Sesquicentennial.

Michigan

Michigan Civil War Sesquicentennial Committee does not show any funding or grant program directly for the Civil War Sesquicentennial.

Mississippi

The Mississippi Sesquicentennial of the American Civil War Commission site does not show any funding or grant program directly for the Civil War Sesquicentennial.

Missouri

The Missouri Civil War Sesquicentennial Commission purpose is to increase awareness and understanding of Missouri's role in the Civil War but does not show any funding or grant program directly for the Civil War Sesquicentennial.

New Jersey

New Jersey Civil War Sesquicentennial Committee does not show any funding or grant program directly for the Civil War Sesquicentennial.

New York

New York State Civil War Sesquicentennial Committee does not show any funding or grant program directly for the Civil War Sesquicentennial.

North Carolina

The North Carolina Civil War Sesquicentennial Committee does not show any funding or grant program directly for the Civil War Sesquicentennial.

Ohio

Civil War 150 Advisory Committee does not show any funding or grant program directly for the Civil War Sesquicentennial.

Pennsylvania

Pennsylvania Civil War 150 (PACW 150) is the official statewide program commemorating the 150th anniversary of the Civil War, 2011–2015, which does not show any funding or grant program directly for the Civil War Sesquicentennial.

South Carolina

The South Carolina Civil War Sesquicentennial Advisory Board does not show any funding or grant program directly for the Civil War Sesquicentennial.

Tennessee

The Tennessee Civil War Sesquicentennial Commission was created to lead the state's efforts in commemorating the 150th anniversary of the Civil War does not show any funding or grant program directly for the Civil War Sesquicentennial.

Virginia

The Virginia Sesquicentennial of the American Civil War Commission has a tax-deductible donation to support the Civil War's 150 year. The Virginia Sesquicentennial of the American Civil War Commission (the commission) and the Virginia Tourism Corporation (VTC) have created a special American Civil War Sesquicentennial Tourism Marketing Program that has a grant program for a 1 to 1 match up to $5,000.00 in promoting the observance of the 150th anniversary of the American Civil War.

West Virginia

West Virginia Sesquicentennial of the American Civil War Commission's mission is to promote awareness, but does not show any funding or grant program directly for the Civil War Sesquicentennial.

Wisconsin

The Wisconsin Civil War Sesquicentennial Commission site does not show any funding or grant program directly for the Civil War Sesquicentennial.

==== Private funding ====
Ulysses S. Grant National Historic Site. According to Historian Pam Sanfilippo "Historical societies, museums, and the NPS are all facing cuts in funding regardless of whether they are government or privately run.'

=== Reenactments ===
Reenactments are a scripted form of educational or entertainment activity in which participants follow a prearranged plan to reconstruct aspects of an event or period which can include living histories, museum exhibits, plays, television, film, travelogues and historiographies.

The first major re-enactment took place at the 1913 Gettysburg reunion.

A century later at the Battle of Gettysburg 150th anniversary commemoration from June 28, 2013, to July 7, 2013, came the largest historical reenactment in the United States. There were approximately 12,000 re-enactors from around the world, over 200,000 spectators, 400 Gettysburg Anniversary Committee workers and nearly 500 reporters that attended the sesquicentennial. This 10-day event in a town of 7,800 people is thought to have brought in over $100 million in economic revenue.

Reenactments for the American Civil War Sesquicentennial are not that much different from reenactments that have taken place in previous years. Most state that they are doing something extra for the 150th anniversary by adding more special events, more re-enactors, or extending the days they are open. However, despite the fanfare of the 150th anniversary, many of the Sesquicentennial Reenactments are very similar in size and organization to the reenactments held in previous years. The American Civil War reenactments incorporate more than just tactical movements of the specific battle being portrayed. The reenactments taking place are part of a larger living history that is put forth to transport the general public back to the Civil War era. Re-enactors of all backgrounds take part in portraying battles, life in camp, and life as a woman at reenactment events. Most reenactments incorporate an opening ceremony, a ladies tea, Union and Confederate Camps to explore, period appropriate sutlers (vendors), field hospitals, bands, military and Cavalry drills, and the actual battle reenactment. Because the war spanned five years the 150th anniversary reenactments are spread out not only across the country but across time as well, taking place from 2011 through 2015.

==== Location and funding ====
Because "current NPS policy does not allow for battle reenactments (simulated combat with opposing lines and casualties) on NPS property," many reenactments take place on private lands such as Boy Scout campgrounds and privately run parks rather than Historic Battlegrounds. However the National Park Service does make an exception regarding Gettysburg; most other sites for the Sesquicentennial are strictly living history sites. These living history sites still include re-enactors, just not full battle demonstrations.

Funding for the sesquicentennial reenactments comes from mainly private sources. Most are local communities starting organizations such as the Gettysburg Anniversary Committee (GAC) formed in 1995 specifically to "promote and host the annual reenactment of the Battle of Gettysburg." Other, smaller reenactments are funded by corporate donations and local charities. For the Sesquicentennial these smaller events are hoping to raise more sponsors for the added traffic organizers are expecting.

==== NPS versus reenactment groups ====
The major clash between the NPS and local reenactment groups is the NPS policy prohibiting re-enactors from portraying opposing lines of battle as well as simulating casualties and deaths. The park service believes that the best way to honor those who died is to remember them in dedication ceremonies, not recreating their deaths. It cites safety as another main reason for leaving out reenactments, stating the black gunpowder used is volatile and can be dangerous to re-enactors as well as spectators. The NPS believes that the story of the American Civil War can be told accurately without the use of dangerous reenactments. Instead, the National Park Service leans heavily on re-enactors for living history events. The NPS is also conscious of the resources wasted in putting on full-scale reenactments.

Re-enactors, who are generally amateur history enthusiasts, understand the safety concerns regarding black powder at their events and feel they do a good job at keeping the public safe by using specific spectator areas. The fundamental issue for the re-enactors, especially for the 150th anniversary, is their belief that the best way to honor the fallen is by educating the public in the horrors that these men faced. In their view, the best way to do that is through battle reenactments and their attention to detail is a sign of respect for those who died.

==== African American reenactors ====
The involvement of Black troops during the war is undisputed, however their re-enactors have been missing from events such as battle reenactments, parades, and ceremonies since the first anniversary of the war. However, in the decades leading up to the sesquicentennial there has been an increasing amount of portrayal of what were called during the Civil War, "Colored Troops" in reenactments, representing soldiers for both the North and the South. This surge of interest in the Civil War by the African-American community is partially attributed to the 1989 movie Glory.

As the number of African American re-enactors grows the number of educational events including them grow as well. For the 150th anniversary many events have been included to incorporate this new group of re-enactors, making the history more complete. Many black regiments participated in 2011 kicking off the sesquicentennial. Their reasons for participation are just as varied and personal as their white counterparts.

The African American Civil War Memorial Freedom Foundation's charter organization is the Sons and Daughters of United States Colored Troops (USCT). In the Sesquicentennial period of April 2011 through May 2015, this site lists reenactments that are occurring that may include members of the USCT re-enactors. Of these planned re-enactments are the May 22–25, 2014 Fight or Freedom at Eastern Virginia sites of Fort Pocahontas at Wilson's Wharf along the James River where in of May 24, 1864, 2500 Confederate troops attacked a contingent of 1400 USCT who more than ably held their own. The Confederates were repulsed once additional Union forces arrived with the Southern troops taking a 5:1 ratio casualty loss. 23rd Regiment United States Colored Troops(USCT) are "the first colored soldiers to fight in combat against the Confederate army of Northern Virginia on May 15, 1864 during the battle of Spotsylvania Courthouse." Descendants and all interested parties of the history of this fighting group are invited to an organizational meeting of commemoration in January 2012. Finding a positive response, a nucleus of would be re-enactors begins meeting at John J. Wright Civil War Museum in Spotsylvania, Virginia. Monthly gatherings for history lectures on the USCT and the Civil War are often preludes to organizational plans for the formal Presentations of the Colors at historic gatherings, at Cemetery memorials and as a part of Living History Days wearing the full regalia of a 23rd Regiment USCT soldier, circa 1864. These meetings and photos of the public displays are catalogued on the 23rd Regiment Facebook page. Actual re-enactments are on May 19 and 20, 2012 for The Battle of Spotsylvania Courthouse; on October 13, 2012, with an encampment at the Appomattox Court House National Historical Park, Virginia; on Memorial Day weekend in 2013 joining 3rd U.S. Regulars and the 13th Virginia Infantry as NPS honor guards at the Fredericksburg National Cemetery, Fredericksburg, Virginia.

==== Women reenactors ====
The idea of women re-enactors on the battlefield can be a touchy subject as not all women want to play the role of a nurse or local civilian; roles that are needed mainly for living history events. Women who want to play a combat roles (which was indeed played by a few women in disguise in the 1860s), find themselves up against history and the men who lead local Civil War Reenactment Regiments. The men who exclude women from their organizations cite historical accuracy as the main reason why women are excluded from their reenactments. However, Nina Brands argues that they are being more hypocritical than they realize. She says that re-enactors are much heavier than historic soldiers, but women are about the right size. Since 2011, the reenactment community is slowly beginning to open its ranks for female recruits in the sesquicentennial.

==== Controversy ====
Dual reenactments happened at both Antietam (2012) and Gettysburg (2013) to commemorate the 150th anniversary of the Civil War. Dual reenactments tend to create divisions among the hobby's progressive, mainstream and farb re-enactors. They also create confusion about the events' dates, times and registration periods. While neither reenactment committee is fighting the other, dual reenactments tend to distract from the entire celebration at hand and creates animosity within re-enacting regiments. Spectators offered less argumentative problems but insisted that Gettysburg's tourism bureau endorse a specific reenactment. One reenactment is attempting to display historical accuracy, while the other is putting on a show for the spectators. Both are presented by two completely different entities looking to establish themselves as both educational and entertaining. Most re-enactment regiments vote as a group on which reenactment they feel best fits the unit; this is based on the type reenactment, the authenticity, registration and ticket price and the destination of the profits.

=== Other commemoration ===
Academic and independent institutions commemorate the Sesquicentennial of the American Civil War (ACW) in their own manner. Some host memorial gatherings on the grounds of former slave communities; others hold community action street festivals incorporating education, musical presentations and social action job fairs and health clinics while still others arrange lecture series blending issues of the ACW with contemporary racial concerns.

=== The Georgia Historical Society’s Civil War 150 Project ===
In Summer 2010, in anticipation of the sesquicentennial of the Civil War, the Georgia Historical Society hosted college and university faculty from across the nation during a 4-week summer seminar funded by the National Endowment for the Humanities entitled, “The American Civil War at 150: New Approaches.” Through lectures and discussions with leading scholars in the field (including David Blight, Edward Ayers, and Elizabeth Brown Pryor), readings, directed research in primary source documents, and analysis of selected local sites, participants were encouraged to approach the causes of the war in new ways, analyze the choosing of sides, explore issues of slavery and emancipation, and consider the war as it has been remembered in our collective history and memory.

The following historical markers are among those erected or refurbished by the Georgia Historical Society:

- African-American Soldiers in Combat (Whitfield County)
- Battery Hamilton (Chatham County)
- Beach Institute (Chatham County)
- Birthplace of John C. Fremont (Chatham County)
- Campaign for Atlanta: Johnston Review (Whitfield County)
- Civil War Slave Conspiracy (Brooks County)
- Civil War Women’s Riot (Muscogee County)
- CSS Georgia: The “Ladies’ Gunboat” (Chatham County)
- Explosion at the Confederate Powder Works (Richmond County)
- Gen. Montgomery C. Meigs, U.S.A (Richmond County)
- General Cleburne’s Proposal to Arm the Slaves (Whitfield County)
- General Thomas Edwin Greenfield Ransom (1834-1864) (Floyd County)
- Georgia’s Secession Convention (Baldwin County)
- Georgians in the Union Army (Dawson County)
- Hampton Plantation (Glynn County)
- History of Emancipation: Gen. David Hunter and General Orders No. 7 (Chatham County)
- History of Emancipation: Special Field Orders No. 15 (Chatham County)
- Largest Slave Sale in Georgia History (Chatham County)
- March to the Sea – Atlanta (DeKalb County)
- March to the Sea – Savannah (Chatham County)
- March to the Sea: Ebenezer Creek (Effingham County)
- Mrs. Beall’s Mill (Putnam County)
- Sherman’s March to the Sea: Battle of Shaw’s Bridge and Shaw’s Dam (Chatham County)
- The Battles for Atlanta (Fulton County)
- The Burning and Destruction of Atlanta (Fulton County)
- The Burning of Darien (McIntosh County)
- The Capture of Covington (Newton County)
- The Madden Branch Massacre: Anti-Confederate Activity in North Georgia (Fannin County)
- William Clayton Fain: Georgia Unionist (Fannin County)

=== Ken Burns' project ===
Noted documentarian Ken Burns has been working on a project to commemorate the Gettysburg Address given by Abraham Lincoln four months after the battle at Gettysburg. Titled "The Address," this documentary is set to be released in April 2014. Burns has an online website, "Learn the Address" that shows videos of noted individuals and ordinary folk alike reciting the Gettysburg Address. The site includes celebrities such as President Obama, former presidents George W. Bush and Bill Clinton, along with Steven Spielberg and Stephen Colbert. On November 9, 2013, President Obama's rendition of Lincoln's address was posted on this site. Obama came under attack from talk radio hosts who noted that his rendition left out the "under God" part (which exists in some but not all versions) White House spokesman Jay Carney explained that Obama had merely read the Nicolay copy of the address that Burns provided.

== States ==
Twenty-five States have formally established Sesquicentennial of the American Civil War committees, commissions or departments within each State that are then linked to the National Park Service website. Those States are: Arkansas, Connecticut, Delaware, Georgia, Illinois, Indiana, Iowa, Kansas, Maine, Maryland, Michigan, Mississippi, Missouri, New Jersey, New York, North Carolina, Ohio, Oklahoma, Pennsylvania, South Carolina, Tennessee, Utah, Virginia, West Virginia, and Wisconsin. Regardless of configuration, they may involve both public and private funding partnerships. States with legislatively designated commissions are: Arkansas, Maine, Mississippi, Oklahoma, and Virginia. States whose commemoratives are directed by state heritage agencies or historical societies are: Delaware, Illinois, Indiana, Iowa, Kansas, Michigan, New Jersey, Ohio and Pennsylvania. The States that are relying on their own boards of tourism or economic development to present the Sesquicentennial story are: Georgia, Maryland, Missouri, North Carolina, Tennessee and West Virginia. New York, South Carolina and Utah are drawing from many entities to manage their commemoratives. Central Connecticut State University handles their State's presentations while in Wisconsin the Department of Veterans Affairs manages theirs. The States of Kansas and West Virginia are using the Sesquicentennials of their own States as a co-celebration with the national Civil War commemoratives.

=== Arkansas ===
The Shiloh Museum of Ozark History as well as the State's Department of Arkansas Heritage brings together a varied group of communicators, professors, historians and even young Arkansas students, selected for their own prize winning essays on the Sesquicentennial. The four- to five-minute audio presentations cover topics as expected of the "Confederate Women of Arkansas" and "Arkansas Battlefield Archeology." The podcasts are also varied with "Unionism in Arkansas," "Medicine in Trans-Mississippi" and "Bats and the Civil War." One particularly egregious event is recounted in the podcast "Racial Atrocities during the Camden Expedition," the April 1864 engagement that commences as a forage for corn around Camden, Arkansas and ends in brutality against USCT. While the 1st Kansas Expeditionary force is setting about their re-supplying, they encounter the 29th Texas Cavalry, who they previously defeat at the engagement at Honey Springs. Now, it is 5000 Confederate troops defeating the almost 1200 Federal troops, among them the 1st Kansas Colored Infantry, in what becomes a part of the larger Battle of Poison Springs, Arkansas legacy. Of the 310 Federal troops killed near Camden, 116 are members of the 1st Kansas Colored Infantry. Nine wounded USCT troops are later sought by roaming members of the 29th Texas Cavalry and shot to death while undergoing treatment at battlefield aid stations, presumably in retaliation for battlefield actions "by Negroes against our Confederate troops." Podcast reader Mark K. Christ, a member of the Arkansas Preservation Board, comments: "This War became one of extermination."

=== Georgia ===
The State of Georgia's National Park Service (NPS) linked site offers a resource for examining and understanding the African American experience in the United States. The NPS selects "From the Civil War to Civil Rights" as the Sesquicentennial theme. The intent is to be more inclusive in nature than what has gone before in the Centennial period, when Jim Crow policies are still a factor in many Southern regions of the United States. To discuss issues of "African Americans in the Civil War" this NPS section is further broken into segments of Ethnography, African Reflections on the American Landscape and one focus group research, done under the auspices of Georgia researchers. Entitled "African American Attitudes toward the Civil War: The War of Jubilee: Tell Our Stories and We Will Come," is a partnership of Kennesaw Mountain National Battlefield Park (KEMO) and the Kennesaw State University Center for the Study of the Civil War. Conducted in 2010, with the three goals of understanding the perspectives of the local African American community, inquiring how African Americans would like their history interpreted and finally, facilitating the incorporation of these desired interpretations into KEMO's presentations. Fifty-seven African American Participants with a history of involvement in heritage and/or preservation groups and also member participants with the National Association for the Advancement of Colored People (NAACP) interact and discuss with the Facilitators. Questions are posed to get a sense of the Participants' attitudes about the Civil War and also about the displays presently offered at KEMO. The Participant's responses indicate that inclusive representation of the range of African American history remains doubtful. There persists the sense among Black citizens that the Southern White population is resistant to any change in the "Lost Cause" narrative and instead prefers and only supports the marginalization of African Americans by being represented as enslaved persons. The men and women of the Participant group suggest changes in data collection from African American families and communities, preferring more personalized histories be found and represented when telling their history. Facilitators list the inclusion of the USCT history as well as the stories of the diversity of the African American lives and communities both before and after the Civil War is included in an updated KEMO interpretation. The Facilitators are also recommending that the histories of the local, Historically Black Colleges and Universities (HBCU) and religious communities that grew from the post-War, mid-19th century are represented and that the educational community will engage in these efforts.

=== New York ===
Hartwick College in Oneonto, New York hosts a "Sesquicentennial Celebration" concurrent with the academic year from 2011 through 2012. This independent, 1500 undergraduate school with Lutheran roots arranges twenty nine lectures on topics of the Underground Railroad explained for a young audience with storytelling and puppeteers to the Historical Methods students culling college archives for institutional links to the Civil War. The intent of this symposium, among other things, is presumed to be inclusive of the African American experience, the institutional history of Hartwick College and the regional ties to the War.

=== South Carolina ===
In December 2010, the Secession Ball is held on the 20th of that month in Charleston, South Carolina drew protests from the local National Association for the Advancement of Colored People (NAACP). The event is hosted by the Sons of Confederate Veterans at the Gaillard Municipal Auditorium. Re-enactors representing the chairman that called for Secession in 1860 display the original "Ordinance of Secession" amidst attendees in antebellum period clothing. Lonnie Anderson of the Charleston NAACP states that the gathering is "nothing more than a celebration of slavery." Commenting on behalf of the Charleston Parks and Recreation Department, set to schedule and manage Sesquicentennial events within that county, Tom O'Rourke admits that "controversy and hard feelings" are expected during this commemorative period. Beyond the confrontations, there is anticipation that this will also open the lines of communication between all parties and the hopes that the Commemorative period will represent all South Carolinians' perspectives of the Civil War.

=== Texas ===
As one of the activities for the State of Texas in this Sesquicentennial era, the city of Galveston has raised funds to erect a marker commemorating Juneteenth. This is significant as on June 19, 1865, Federal troops finally arrived in Galveston, Texas to declare that the Emancipation Proclamation has been signed two and one half years prior and that General Robert Lee has surrendered at Appomattox Courthouse in Virginia on April 9 of that year. The War is over. A contraction of June 19 becomes Juneteenth, the designation of a day of joyous celebration that slavery is over and is annually commemorated. The Galveston Historical Society is also making available a seventy-two page pamphlet of African Americans in Texas: A Lasting Legacy Timeline that may be Downloaded at this site. This pamphlet includes a multitude of historical sites related to African American history in the State of Texas including churches, school, museums and residential and community districts. Photographs and brief synopsis of the locales are provided.

=== Virginia ===
The Commonwealth of Virginia, as a contribution to the 150th Anniversary of the American Civil War, conducts an annual Signature Conference Series commencing in 2009 and presented through 2015. The day-long meetings included panelists of note on topics that correlate to the circumstances leading up to, during and post-Civil War period. 2009 is "America on the Eve of the Civil War;" 2010: "Race, Slavery and the Civil War;" 2011: "Military Strategy;" 2012: "Leadership and Generalship in the Civil War;" 2013: "The Civil War at Home;" 2014: "The American Civil War in a Global Context;" 2015: "The Causes Won and Lost." The events may be by registered attendance at an academic center in Virginia or are available on DVD for purchase. Individual speaker presentations are approximately fifteen minutes in length. The 2010 Conference topic of "Race, Slavery and the Civil War: The Tough Stuff of American History and Memory is held in September of that year at Norfolk State University, Norfolk, Virginia and chaired by historian James O. Horton, PhD. A sampling of that day's panel are: David Pitcaithley, PhD on "Causes of the Civil War and Public History," and Ira Berlin, PhD speaks on "The African American Soldier." Edna Medford, PhD of Howard University discusses that in the quest for Black rights there must be a dismantling of the contemporary social and legal systems within that Southern culture that is maintaining slavery.

== Art ==
Contemporary artists have found an opportunity to showcase their works in museums that are putting on exhibits for the Sesquicentennial. Artists like, Dale Gallon, Mort Kuntsler, and Don Troiani have commissioned pieces specifically for this anniversary as a way to capitalize on the revitalized popularity of the Civil War. Well-renowned historical artist Dale Gallon has created 10 new oil paintings for the 150th Anniversary that are currently on display as reproduced murals at the Seminary Ridge Museum in Gettysburg. According to Gallon's website, "The museum will feature 20,000 square feet of interactive exhibit galleries and educational programming..." The 10 new pieces created by Gallon focus on 3 key themes that emphasize life during the Civil War; the first day of combat at the Battle of Gettysburg, hospitalization and treated the wounded, and the moral, spiritual, and civic debates that arose around the Civil War. In a release from the museum the executive director, Barbara Franco, states that the Gallon exhibit, "... will help visitors make a connection to the events on Seminary Ridge and help them understand the voices of duty and devotion focused on [in the exhibit]." The exhibit opened on July 1, 2013, on the 150th anniversary of the Battle of Gettysburg and is now a permanent feature of the museum. Mort Kuntsler recently finished an exhibit at the South Carolina State Museum entitled, For Us the Living, that ran until April 7, 2013. The show included, 30 paintings and sketches, which were "a highlight of more than 350 Civil War scenes Kuntsler has painted over the past 25 years." After this show, Kuntsler only plans to paint 8 more Civil War themed pieces before retiring from this genre. This collection will be called, A Tribute to the Legend, and will feature, "historical locations, personalities, and events that are special to Kunstler." For the 150th anniversary of the Civil War, Kuntsler partnered with America Remembers to produce the Mort Kuntsler Civil War Sesquicentennial Tribute Rifle. The tribute rifle, a Henry rifle, which was a reliable gun during the war, is attributed with Kuntsler artwork in 24-karat gold. Don Troiani has created a number of commissioned works for the 150th anniversary of the Civil War. Most notably, one oil piece that depicts a pivotal moment of African-American involvement on the battlefront, when Sgt. Maj. Thomas R. Hawkins, First Sgt. Alexander Kelly, and Lt. Nathan Edgerton rush forward and recover the Union colors. The painting was revealed in June 2013 at the Union League of Philadelphia.

=== Gettysburg Cyclorama ===
The Gettysburg Cyclorama is a huge art piece, 377 ft. long, 42 ft. high, and weighing 12.5 tons. The cyclorama was originally painted with oil on canvas by Paul Philippoteaux to commemorate the Battle of Gettysburg, and it was opened to the public at Chicago in 1883 with critical and popular acclaim. The enormity of the cyclorama surrounded audiences and transported them the height of the battle. After the popularity of cyclorama dwindled around the start of the 20th century with the popularity of motion pictures, it was taken down and stored in abysmal conditions until it was purchased, mended, and hung in 1913. The cyclorama was purchased by the National Park Service in the late 1940s and underwent its first major restoration in 1962, just before the battle's centennial. According to the National Park Service's website, the restoration required, "... hours of hand labor to repair water damaged portions of the painting and two large sections faded by years of direct sunlight."

For the 150th anniversary the cyclorama underwent a five-year restoration project that started in 2003 at a cost of $15 million. For the restoration, "conservators separated the painting's 27 panels and cleaned each one inch by inch with cotton swabs, stabilized brittle areas and removed bad touchups and damaging glue." The painting, for the first time in decades, has been hung correctly so that it bows inward and gives audiences the feeling of 3-dimensionality.

When the cyclorama was restored in 1962 a new visitor center was commissioned to house the piece. Created by well renowned architect, Richard Neutra. Neurta's design was a part of the National Park's Services' Mission 66, which sought to update "deteriorated and dangerous conditions in the national parks." The visitor center he created was situated right on the battlefield. Through Mission 66, parks underwent modernization, and Neutra's design for the Gettysburg Visitor Center reflected that. "Critics claimed the new building represented the idealism that was a part of the modern movement of the 1960s." By 1999, however, the building had become decrepit and the NPS planned its demolition to restore the sight lines of the battleground its original 1863 aesthetic. This stirred a controversy amongst spectators, including Neutra's son, Dion Neutra, who believed the building itself was worthy of preservation and a part of the National Park Service's own history. Neutra's building closed in 2005 and the Cyclorama painting was moved to its new museum and visitor center in 2007, and two years later, in 2009, during the midst of the 150th anniversary of the Civil War, Neutra's building was bulldozed. The new visitor center opened in 2008 and was designed by Cooper, Robertson & Partners to resemble a 19th-century farm.

=== Music ===
Many states involved with the sesquicentennial incorporated music festivals as a tribute. The Wisconsin band, dressed in both blue and gray uniforms, sounded trumpets to popular military tunes to commemorate the Battle of Chancellorsville. This band modeled itself, among those of other states, after the original bands to each respective area. Commemorators expressed how bands shaped the Civil War by soothing the men who had seen so much death. Frankfort, Kentucky contributed a celebration of the music of the Civil War era in a Cornets and Cannons Festival. This performance includes period instruments and will include some of the best and most experienced brass bands today re-creating the music of the Civil War era. Performers from around the country contributed to the overall performance from September 1 through September 4, 2011.

The Friends of Michigan History put on their third annual The Turning Point of the War, 1863 concert as a tribute to the Sesquicentennial. Both the male soldiers and the ladies of the band wear authentic Civil War outfits while 5th Michigan Regiment Band performed pre-1865 compositions on authentic brass instruments. Members of the band discussed their distress how too often historical events such as the sesquicentennial are completely lost in history. In addition to state bands, the sesquicentennial of the Civil war inspired popular band Civil War. Civil War posted a new music video for the track "Gettysburg" as a tribute to the anniversary on their latest album "The Killer Angels." The band commented on the released video as a contribution in respect for the one who lost their loves long ago on the battlefield of Gettysburg.

=== Theater ===
Barter Theatre in Abingdon, Virginia premiered Rappahannock County and the theatre musical Civil War Voices, based on period diaries and letters of the period. In addition, the Shenandoah Valley Wayside Theatre and The Whipping Man, originally produced by Manhattan Theatre Club added to theater contributions around the country. However, controversy over how un-popularized other productions in states who chose to not commemorate the sesquicentennial, such as Chicago, has led supporters of commemoration to speak out to their local government about funding. In addition to theater performances, Decatur, Alabama, The Princess Theatre Center for the Performing Arts commemorated with a lecture of stories of the era, book signing, and a concert "Songs and Stories of the Civil War". The 1891 Fredonia Opera House in New York gave nod to the anniversary with a one-man, multimedia production A Better Band Than Mine. This production, originally created in 2002, is based on the actual letters of Civil War Musician, J. Herbert George, 10th Vermont Infantry. Creator Thomas Loughlin created this play due to his love of history of the Civil War and combining his fascination of digital technology.

== Digital media ==
Numerous document digitization projects, such as the Civil War 150 Legacy Project: Document Digitization and Access, have been produced through legislature created commissions, like the Virginia Sesquicentennial of the American Civil War Commission. The document digitization projects involve the digitization, or computer imaging, of privately owned Civil War documents, such as soldier diaries or letters. Through the digitization of these documents, easier access and search of relevant Civil War information is readily available to the public online. These commissions aim to give scholars and the public information about the social, religious and political beliefs of Civil War Era soldiers.

=== Mobile apps ===
Various sesquicentennial apps for mobile devices have appeared, many of these applications free for use. Many of the apps contain various educational and informational features such as GPS battleground locators and guides as well as interactive photographs and maps. "Tennessee Civil War 150," is an app created by the state of Tennessee, which contains various educational features. These features include people, places, artifacts, events and a "nearby" feature, which uses GPS tracking to locate Civil War battlegrounds near your current location. Features such as its "artifacts" option on the homepage allows users to view photographs of various weapons and clothing items from the Civil War. Upon selecting a photo, a brief description of the item is displayed, educating users of its Civil War use as well as ownership history of the item.

=== State tourism in digital media ===
Digital media has played an important role in Civil War Sesquicentennial tourism. Various states' and battlefield use websites to promote the Civil War sites' activities that have sprouted as part of the sesquicentennial, efficiently and effectively. Organizations such as The Civil War Preservation Trust offer online features that create an itinerary of battlefields and their corresponding events. Through creating itineraries, guests are able to maximize their experience. In line with Civil War Sesquicentennial events, hotels near these events have incorporated the sesquicentennial into their tourism efforts, offering various "Civil War Packages," which include hotel stays, Civil War lectures, art, and battlefield options as well as discounts for purchasing these online packages. The state of Virginia has invested in online sesquicentennial tourism promotions, offering an online trip planner, and promoting less conventional Civil War attractions, such as trail tours, which offer a different story than traditional Civil War events like traditional battle reenactments. The Virginia State tourism website also offers its webpage in various languages, creating a larger audience for its tourism attempts.

=== Education ===
Many states, particularly Southern states, created special educational repositories for teaching the American Civil War during the Sesquicentennial. Many states utilize various Digital Humanities projects, particularly the National Endowment for the Humanities EDSITEment project The EDSITEment website provides ready-made lesson plans with guiding questions and significant primary sources to expand the curriculum. The inclusion of sourcework into online repositories can be used for gaining an understanding of the American Civil War. Other repositories used are listed below.

=== Education resources ===
Many digital educational resources for teachers have developed out of the sesquicentennial, including virtual reality games such as "ValleySim." This digital resource has been adopted by a number of schools, which allows users to virtually experience life of both Northern and Southern soldiers during the Civil War. Many states offer various educational resources for students and teachers on their Civil War Sesquicentennial websites, such as Pennsylvania on their page "Pennsylvania Civil War 150." Through their "Resources for Teachers" link, various resources are available, including interactive timelines and maps. Various institutions of higher education have also participated in sesquicentennial events. Longwood University has created a series of podcasts entitled That a Nation Might Live to commemorate issues, people and events of the Civil War. The university has integrated this project into undergraduate programs, creating active engagement between students and the Civil War through its written research by undergraduate students.

There is a guide for middle school aged students that has resources geared specifically for them. The LibGuide is part of a project to encourage middle school and high school students to utilize archival collections for their projects, and to assist in making learning history more enjoyable.

The Civil War Trust is dedicated to the preservation of American Civil War battlefields. For the sesquicentennial they have compiled a battle narrative.

The Gilder Lehrman Institute for American History is a non-profit digital history project for the nation's public school systems. They provide lesson plans but their focus is digitization of valuable primary sources for free viewing.

The Library of Congress published a website for general viewing to transmit an American narrative. They offer small synopses of various important events before and during the war effort.

The Library of Congress has a memory site. It provides a large database of primary sourcework for public school analysis. Everything is free access and open to anyone wishing to utilize their resources.

The National Archives has created a mobile repository of Civil War information and artifacts that circulates to host museums.

=== Social media ===
Commemoration for the Sesquicentennial of the American Civil War can be viewed through various social media sites like Instagram and Twitter through hashtags such as #CivilWar150, #CW150 and #CivilWar. The Sesquicentennial is the first anniversary of the American Civil War that has seen the use of social media technologies. This technology offers a unique insight of the public's perspective on the sesquicentennial by allowing each person the opportunity to voice his or her opinion in a free forum.

Typical users on these sites are photojournalists, bloggers and tourists visiting a wide selection of sesquicentennial events across multiple states. The photojournalists on average are above the age of 35 and tend to have a more serious opinion of the events. While many of the tourists appear to below the age of 25 and have a more lighthearted humorous view of the Civil War.

=== Controversy ===
The NPS asked President Obama to make some remarks at Gettysburg on the anniversary of Lincoln's speech. However, Obama declined and assigned the United States Secretary of the Interior, Sally Jewell, the task of appearing at Gettysburg on his behalf. In addition, "Gettysburg NMP Law Enforcement Ranger Morgan Brooks" read a prepared statement written by Obama for the event; this letter also appears on the White House website.

Retraction of Lincoln criticism and reactions

The sesquicentennial of the Gettysburg Address also saw a regional paper called The Patriot-News retract a negative editorial it published on November 24, 1863, regarding "the silly remarks of the President." This belated retraction was much discussed in the media, and even became fodder for a Saturday Night Live skit featuring the character "Jebidiah Atkinson," played by Taran Killam. News publication The Week mocked the retraction and remarked that it "[wa]sn't the most consequential apology, nor the most belated." The article proceeded to list other belated apologies, including a June 18, 2009 U.S. Senate resolution passed to apologize for the institution of slavery and segregation.

== Hollywood ==
Hollywood's take on the war has been especially influential in shaping public memory, as seen in such film "classics" as The Birth of a Nation (1915), Gone with the Wind (1939), and Lincoln (2012).

=== Filmography ===
- Andersonville (1996)
- An Occurrence at Owl Creek Bridge (1962)
- The Battle of Gettysburg (1913)
- The Birth of a Nation (1915)
- The Blue and the Gray (1982 TV series)
- The Civil War (1990)
- Civil War Minutes: Confederate (2007)
- Civil War Minutes: Union (2001)
- Cold Mountain (2003)
- The Colt (2005)
- Dances with Wolves (1990)
- Dog Jack (2010)
- Drums in the Deep South (1951)
- The General (1926)
- Gettysburg (1993)
- Glory (1989)
- Gods and Generals (2003)
- Gone with the Wind (1939)
- The Good The Bad and The Ugly (1967)
- The Horse Soldiers (1959)
- The Hunley (1999)
- The Last Confederate: The Story of Robert Adams (2007)
- Lincoln (2012)
- Major Dundee (1965)
- North and South (TV miniseries) Trilogy (1985, 1986, 1994)
- The Outlaw Josey Wales (1976)
- Pharaoh's Army (1995)
- Raintree County (1957)
- The Red Badge of Courage (1951)
- Ride with the Devil (1999)
- The Shadow Riders (1982)
- Shenandoah (1965)
- Sommersby (1993)
- Wicked Spring (2002)

== Falling attendance ==
The five major Civil War battlefield parks operated by the National Park Service (Gettysburg, Antietam, Shiloh, Chickamauga/Chattanooga and Vicksburg) had a combined 3.1 million visitors in 2018, down 70% from 10.2 million in 1970. Attendance at Gettysburg in 2018 was 950,000, a decline of 86% since 1970.

Until recently, these battlefield Parks did the research and taught the visitors “who shot who where,” without providing any explanation of why that all was happening. Major changes recently have included greater outreach, especially to minorities, women, and young people, and also a heavy interpretive explanation focusing on the evils of slavery as the cause of the war and thus the battles.

== See also ==
- Commemoration of the American Revolution
- Commemoration of the American Civil War on postage stamps
- Confederate holidays
- Confederate monuments
- Confederate-Union Veterans' Monument in Morgantown
- Gettysburg battlefield monuments
- National Civil War Naval Museum
- Postal history of the Confederacy
- Postal history of the Union (U.S.)
- Reenactments of the American Civil War
- Treue der Union Monument
- Soldiers' and Sailors' Arch
