= The Ruling Race: A History of American Slaveholders =

1982 book by James Oakes

- First edition
- Author: James Oakes
- Publisher: Alfred A. Knopf
- Publication date: 1982
- Media type: Print (hardback)
- Pages: 307
- ISBN: 0-394-52163-3

The Ruling Race: A History of American Slaveholders is a book by James Oakes published in 1982 by Alfred A. Knopf.

The Ruling Race attempts a comprehensive history of the American slaveholding classes from the late 18th century until the Civil War. Oakes examines the function of slavery with regard to the social mobility of Southerners and the broad spectrum of social and economic backgrounds representing the slaveowning minority.

== Contents ==
Introduction

- PART I: THE COLONIAL LEGACY

Revolutionary Slaveholders

- PART II: THE MARKET CULTURE

Master-class Pluralism The Slaveholder’s Pilgrimage The Convenient Sin Freedom and Bondage

- PART III: PLANTATIONS, PLEBIANS, AND PATRIARCHS

Factories in the Fields Masters of Tradition

Epilogue: The Slaveholder’s Revolution

- APPENDIX, NOTES AND BILBLIOGRAPHY

Appendix: Sample of Slaveholders from the 1850 Census

== Reviews ==
Historian Julia Floyd Smith writing in The Florida Historical Quarterly considers The Ruling Race “a most provocative study of the slaveowning class,” and “a scholarly contribution” to the topic.

Joseph P. Reidy, writing in The Journal of Negro History, considers The Ruling Race retrogressive in perspective, especially in its emphasis on the slaveholding class in lieu of offering perspectives primarily "through the eyes of the slaves.”

Terming the book “puzzling” and “a jumble of logical and historical fallacies," Reidy takes particular issue with Oates’s arguments challenging historian Eugene D. Genovese’s position on Paternalism among slaveholding elites, while accusing Oates of intellectual sleigh-of-hand in formulating his arguments.

== Theme ==
“From their fear of failure and their pride of accomplishment, from their psychological ambivalence and the contradiction of their culture, slaveholders fashioned a spacious vision that put human bondage at the center of their private worlds. As if to overcome their own uncertainty, they expanded that vision into a political outlook that defended slavery as a bulwark of southern prosperity, American democracy, and even the world economy…every expression of the slaveholders’ gospel of prosperity became an implicit defense of slavery.”—James Oakes in The Ruling Race

The thesis of The Ruling Race emerges from arguments that Paternalism among Southern slaveowning elites in the late colonial period was displaced by the rise of petty-bourgeois entrepreneurial slaveowners in the post- Revolutionary period.

The members of these upperwardly mobile entrepreneurs who owned less than twenty slaves—often as few as three or four —embraced both white-supreacist traditions as well those of political democracy. These two tenets became inextricably linked in their struggle for wealth and social status: “The gospel of prosperity and the defense of bondage were inseparable…” Julia Floyd Smith writes:

Racial attitudes, which upheld the inferiority of Negro slaves, were fixed during colonial times and were not altered significantly in the nineteenth century. However, classism among the slaveholders was altered as the southern economy pushed westward and democratic ideals encouraged liberal principles of equality.

Political dissonance was inevitable when Southern liberalism, forged in the War for Independence, were confronted by the Unionist antislavery movement: “How could the slaverholder’s ideology…reinforce simultaneously their devotion to black slavery and to democratic freedom? It is here, in the triumph of the slaveholders’ liberalism, that the legacy of slavery becomes a truly American dilemma.”

== Sources ==
- Oakes, James. 1982. The Ruling Race: A History of American Slaveholders. Alfred A. Knopf, New York. ISBN 0-394-52163-3
- Reidy, Joseph P.. 1983. Review: “The Ruling Race: A History of American Slaveholders by James Oakes.” The Journal of Negro History , Winter, 1983, Vol. 68, No. 1, pp. 95-97. The University of Chicago Press, Chicago, Ill. https://www.jstor.org/stable/2717463 Accessed 11 June, 2026.
- Smith, Julia Floyd. 1984. Review: “The Ruling Race, a History of American Slaveholders by James Oakes.” The Florida Historical Quarterly, Vol. 62, No. 4 (Apr., 1984), pp. 509-511. Florida Historical Society. https://www.jstor.org/stable/30146602 Accessed 11 June, 2026.
