= The Scorpion's Sting: Antislavery and the Coming of the Civil War =

2014 book by James Oakes

The Scorpion’s Sting: Antislavery and the Coming of the Civil War
- First edition
- Author: James Oakes
- Publisher: W. W. Norton & Company
- Publication date: 2014
- Media type: Print (hardback)
- Pages: 208
- ISBN: 978-0-393-23993-5

The Scorpion’s Sting: Antislavery and the Coming of the Civil War is a non-fiction book by James Oakes published in 2014 by W. W. Norton & Company. The book is the second in a trilogy of histories by Oates dealing with anti-slavery constitutionalism, preceded by Freedom National: The Destruction of Slavery in the United States, 1861-1865 (2013) and followed by The Crooked Path to Abolition (2021).

"The Scorpion's Sting" was a much-repeated political trope in the years preceding the Civil War, based on the myth that scorpions when "girt by fire," i.e. encircled by flames, could be induced to sting themselves to death.

Applying this vivid image as an analogy, anti-slavery constitutionalists argued that hemming in the existing US slave states with free states to the north, banning slavery in the federal territories to the west, and suppressing slavery on the high seas would, in time, lead to the decline and voluntary dismantling of the institution in the South.

Oates also presents an overview of The Law of Nations and the Rules of War as understood by the radical anti-slavery leadership: that armed conflict would make military emancipation an option for the federal government.

== Contents ==
INTRODUCTION: At Stake

- “Like a Scorpion Girt by Fire”
- The Right versus the Wrong of Property in Man
- Race Conflict
- The Wars Over Wartime Emancipation

EPILOGUE: Harriet Beecher Stowe and Her British Sisters

== Reviews ==
Historian David S. Reynolds praises Oakes's success in distinguishing between the conflicting proslavery and antislavery views regarding property: one asserting the sanctity of property as a defense of human bondage, the other arguing that natural self-ownership established an individual's right to freedom. Reynolds also notes Oates’s emphasis on the roles that the Union military and congressional legislation played in effecting emancipation and abolition.

Professor Eric Burin summarizes Oakes's overview of the peacetime methods by which Republicans expected to gradually extinguish slavery based on the Declaration of Independence and the US Constitution, namely, the recognition of fundamental human equality and the suppression of slavery in all domains subject to federal jurisdiction. Threatened with political and economic decline, "the secessionists opted for war." Burin locates Oakes's key contribution in his emphasis on the transformative function of the Union army on Republican's war aims.

What made the Union's military emancipation policies unusual, argues Oakes, was that they were not designed solely to weaken the enemy. Instead, the spread of freedom became a goal unto itself.

Writing in Foreign Affairs, Professor Walter Russell Mead notes the contemporary significance of The Scorpion's Sting to contemporary geopolitics:

[I]nternational law allowed Lincoln to override the constitutional protection of slaveholders' property rights. The point is not merely one of antiquarian interest; the degree to which the provisions of international law affect the rights and responsibilities of the federal government is a controversial subject today. The Scorpion's Sting will lead readers to reflect on the degree to which international law might hold significant implications for the American system of government.

== Sources ==
- Burin, Eric. 2014. Review: "The Scorpion's Sting: Antislavery and the Coming of the Civil War by James Oakes" The Virginia Magazine of History and Biography , 2014, Vol. 122, No. 3 (2014), pp. 278-280. Accessed 11 June, 2026.
- Kreitner, Richard. 2021. "Did the Constitution Pave the Way to Emancipation?" The Nation, October 6, 2021. Accessed 11 June, 2026.
- Masó, Albert. 2013. "Why do scorpions 'commit suicide' when surrounded by fire?" Metode, November 7, 2013. Accessed 11 June, 2026.
- Mead, Walter Russell. 2014. Review: "The Scorpion’s Sting: Anti-Slavery and the Coming of the Civil War" Foreign Affairs. Accessed 09 June, 2026.
- Oakes, James. 2014. The Scorpion’s Sting: Antislavery and the Coming of the Civil War. W. W. Norton & Company. ISBN 978-0-393-23993-5
- Rable, George C. 2014. Review: "Freedom National: The Destruction of Slavery in the United States, 1861—1865 by James Oakes" Journal of the Abraham Lincoln Association, SUMMER 2014, Vol. 35, No. 2, pp. 80-84. Accessed 10 June, 2026.
- Reynolds, David S. 2017. "The Hidden History of Slavery" The Kenyon Review, May/June, 2017. Accessed 09 June, 2026.
