= Elizabeth Brown Pryor =

American diplomat and historian

- Born: Mary Elizabeth Brown; March 15, 1951; Gary, Indiana
- Died: April 13, 2015 (aged 64); Richmond, Virginia, U.S.
- Education: University of Pennsylvania; University of London; Northwestern University
- Occupations: Diplomat, historian
- Spouse(s): Anthony Pryor; Frank Parker
- Writing career
- Language: English
- Notable work: Reading the Man: A Portrait of Robert E. Lee through his Private Letters
- Notable awards: Lincoln Prize (2008)

Elizabeth Brown Pryor (March 15, 1951 – April 13, 2015) was an American diplomat and historian.

== Career ==
She was born Mary Elizabeth Brown in Gary, Indiana. Her father worked for AT&T, and the family moved multiple times for his job. She finished her secondary school education in Summit, New Jersey and attended Northwestern University. Upon her graduation in 1973, Pryor began working for the National Park Service. She also obtained a second bachelor's degree from the University of London and a masters in history from the University of Pennsylvania. In 1983, Brown joined the Department of State. She formulated the policy, known as the Pryor Paper, that eventually led the United States to rejoin UNESCO in 2003.

In 2008, Pryor was awarded the Lincoln Prize for Reading the Man: A Portrait of Robert E. Lee through his Private Letters. She shared the honor with James Oakes, who won for The Radical and the Republican: Frederick Douglass, Abraham Lincoln, and the Triumph of Antislavery Politics. Pryor's book is notable for using hundreds of Lee's previously unpublished private letters to create a fresh biography of the Confederate general. Pryor is also the author of the biography Clara Barton: Professional Angel about the founder of the American Red Cross, Clara Barton.

She was married and divorced twice, first to Anthony Pryor, then to Frank Parker.

Pryor was killed in a rear end vehicle accident caused by a speeding car driven by Robert Stevens Gentil in Richmond, Virginia on April 13, 2015. Gentil's long-term mental health issues led to episodes of manic delusions, including the belief on this occasion that his car was flying.

She was survived by her mother, Mary Brown Hamingson, and two sisters.
