= The Destructive War =

The Destructive War: William Tecumseh Sherman, Stonewall Jackson, and the Americans
- Author: Charles Royster
- Language: English
- Publisher: Vintage Books
- Publication date: 1991
- Publication place: United States
- Pages: 564
- ISBN: 978-067973878-7
- OCLC: 22907203

The Destructive War: William Tecumseh Sherman, Stonewall Jackson, and the Americans is a book written by Charles Royster. The book was published in 1993 by Vintage Books. The Destructive War details the lives of William Tecumseh Sherman and Stonewall Jackson and their respective roles in the American Civil War. Through these dual biographies, Royster explores the meaning of patriotism in the face of war and bloodshed.

== Awards ==
1992 Bancroft Prize

1992 Charles S. Sydnor Award

1992 Lincoln Prize

== Reception ==
"One of the most original and stimulating books on the Civil War in many years."

-New York Times

"An illuminating interpretation."

-Wall Street Journal

"Royster’s intriguing analyses fill every page with new information and offer a fresh interpretation of our bloodiest conflict…exhaustively researched, artistically written, brilliantly argued."

-Boston Globe

"A fascinating history of the ideas held by the people who fought the war…fresh, intriguing, philosophical."

-Detroit Free Press

"Royster’s intriguing analyses fill every page with new information and offer a fresh interpretation of our bloodiest conflict…exhaustively researched, artistically written, brilliantly argued."

-Boston Globe
