= Lincoln's Forgotten Ally =

2011 book by Elizabeth D. Leonard

Lincoln's Forgotten Ally: Judge Advocate General Joseph Holt of Kentucky
- Author: Elizabeth D. Leonard
- Subject: Joseph Holt
- Genre: History, Biography
- Publisher: University of North Carolina Press
- Publication date: 2011
- Pages: xii, 417 pages
- Awards: Lincoln Prize
- ISBN: 9780807835005
- OCLC: 708243819
- LC Class: KF368 .H586 L46 2011

Lincoln's Forgotten Ally: Judge Advocate General Joseph Holt of Kentucky is a 2011 biography by historian Elizabeth D. Leonard. The book examines the life and political career of Joseph Holt, who served in the administration of President James Buchanan and later became Judge Advocate General of the United States Army during the presidency of Abraham Lincoln. The biography focuses on Holt's role in maintaining Kentucky's loyalty to the Union during the early stages of the American Civil War, his administration of military justice during the war, and his involvement in the prosecution of the conspirators accused of participating in Lincoln's assassination.

== Background ==
The book was the first full-length scholarly biography devoted to Holt. Leonard places Holt within the broader political and legal history of the Civil War era, emphasizing his support for the Union and his influence within Lincoln's wartime administration.

== Awards ==
The book received the 2012 Lincoln Prize, awarded annually for scholarship on Abraham Lincoln and the American Civil War era. It shared the award with William C. Harris's Lincoln and the Border States: Preserving the Union.
