= Elizabeth D. Leonard =

American historian

- Awards: Lincoln Prize 2011

Academic background
- Education: University of California Riverside

Academic work
- Main interests: American Civil War
- Notable works: Lincoln's Forgotten Ally: Judge Advocate General Joseph Holt of Kentucky

Elizabeth D. Leonard is an American historian and the John J. and Cornelia V. Gibson Professor of History at Colby College in Waterville, Maine. Her areas of specialty include American women and the Civil War era.

== Education ==
Leonard earned an M.A. degree in U.S. History in 1988 and a PhD in 1992 from the University of California Riverside.

== Career ==
Now John J. and Cornelia V. Gibson Professor of History, Emerita, Leonard taught at Colby College after she earned her PhD, serving as an assistant, then associate professor from 1992 to 2003. She was interviewed in a C-SPAN special on the history of Augusta, Maine.

Leonard's research interests focus on the Civil War through the lens of gender (weighing in on controversial figures such as Loreta Janeta Velázquez) as well as race. With the sesquicentennial of the Civil War, Leonard defended the scope of her scholarship in the Civil War era, arguing that there were prominent figures from the time about whom little is known.

=== Awards ===
Between 2000 and 2003, Leonard was the Harriet S. and George C. Wiswell Jr. Research Fellow at Colby College in American History.

Her book Lincoln's Forgotten Ally: Judge Advocate General Joseph Holt of Kentucky won the Lincoln Prize in 2012.

== Publications ==
- Yankee Women: Gender Battles in the Civil War. New York: W.W. Norton, September 17, 1995. ISBN 9780393313727. OCLC 29597008
- All the Daring of the Soldier: Women of the Civil War Armies. New York: W.W. Norton & Co., June 1, 1999. ISBN 9780393335477. OCLC 40543151
- Lincoln's Avengers: Justice, Revenge, and Reunion After the Civil War. New York: W.W. Norton & Co., March 2004. ISBN 9780393048681. OCLC 53223534
- Men of Color to Arms!: Black Soldiers, Indian Wars, and the Quest for Equality. New York: W.W. Norton & Co., August 23, 2010. ISBN 9780393060393. OCLC 449865104
- Lincoln's Forgotten Ally: Judge Advocate General Joseph Holt of Kentucky (Civil War America series). Chapel Hill: University of North Carolina Press, October 10, 2011. ISBN 9780807869383. OCLC 769187885
- Benjamin Franklin Butler: A Noisy, Fearless Life. Chapel Hill: The University of North Carolina Press, 2022. ISBN 9781469668048.
