= Gettysburg: The Last Invasion =

2013 book by Allen Guelzo

- First edition
- Author: Allen Guelzo
- Language: English
- Subject: Military history
- Genre: Non-fiction
- Published: 2013
- Publisher: Knopf
- Publication place: U.S.
- Pages: 656
- ISBN: 0307594084

Gettysburg: The Last Invasion is a 2013 military history non-fiction book by American author Allen Guelzo.

== Reception ==
U.S. historian George C. Rable, writing in the journal Civil War History, reviewed the book favorably, concluding that "this finely wrought volume immediately joins the short list of Gettysburg classics, and I suspect for a good number of readers may attain the number one position," though he noted that "Those unfamiliar with the general outlines of the engagement may have occasional trouble following the story". In The Wall Street Journal Thomas M. Donelly considered the book "wonderful", particularly noting its coverage of John Reynolds' role and restoring perspective on the battle for Little Round Top. A review in NPR written by Stu Seidel called the book a "determinedly fair chronicle" but also considered it "exhaustive, sometimes to the point of exhausting", concluding that the book "goes a long way to leveling the battlefield for all concerned, and makes for an invaluable addition to any American history reader's library".
