= Joseph P. Reidy =

American historian (born 1948)

- Born: Joseph Patrick Reidy; 1948 (age 77–78)
- Education: Villanova University (BA); Northern Illinois University (MA, PhD)
- Occupation: Historian
- Awards: Bancroft Prize (2020)

Joseph Patrick Reidy (born 1948) is an historian of the American Civil War. He is a professor emeritus and retired associate provost at Howard University.

Reidy earned a BA in sociology from Villanova University, followed in 1974 by an M.A. from Northern Illinois University with a thesis titled Negro election day and the New England Black community, 1750-1865. He received his PhD in history in 1982, also from Northern Illinois University with a thesis titled Masters and slaves, planters and freedmen: the transition from slavery to freedom in central Georgia, 1820-1880.

== Publications ==
- Illusions of Emancipation: The Pursuit of Freedom and Equality in the Twilight of Slavery, University of North Carolina Press (2019)
- From Slavery to Agrarian Capitalism in the Cotton Plantation South, Central Georgia 1800-1880, University of North Carolina Press (1995)
- Coeditor with Ira Berlin and Leslie S Rowland, The black military experience, part of Freedom: A Documentary History of Emancipation, 1861-1867, Cambridge University Press, 2010

== Awards and honors ==
- March 2020: Columbia University Bancroft Prize for Illusions of Emancipation: The Pursuit of Freedom and Equality in the Twilight of Slavery
- 2020: Gilder Lehrman Lincoln Prize, Finalist for Illusions of Emancipation: The Pursuit of Freedom and Equality in the Twilight of Slavery
