= James M. McPherson =

American historian (born 1936)

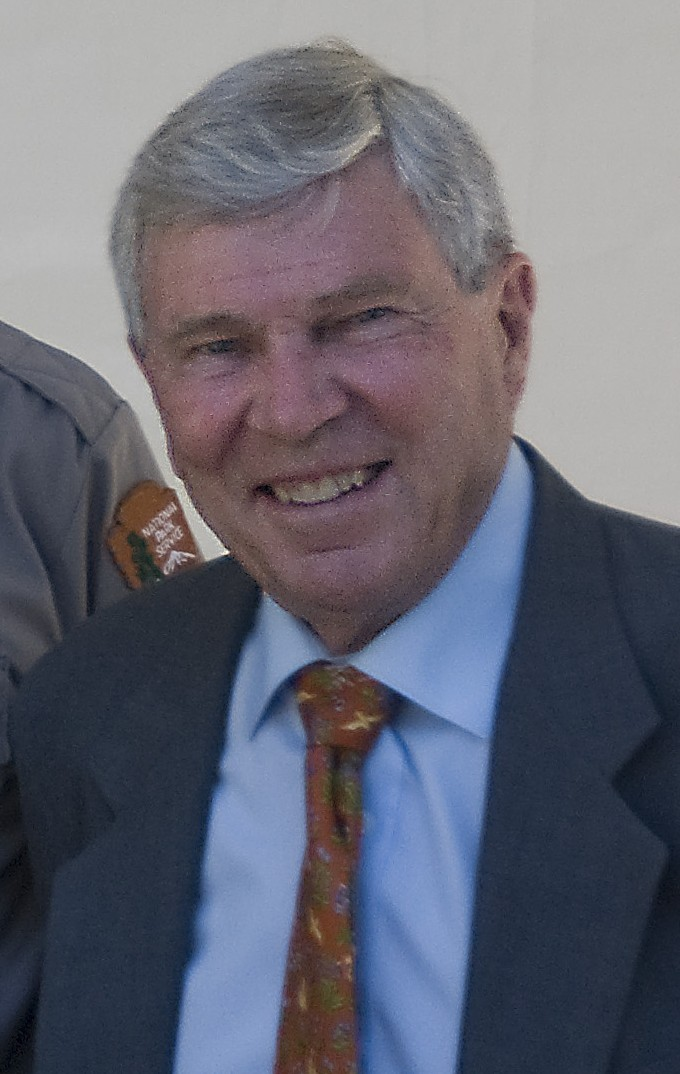
- McPherson in June 2011
- Born: James Munro McPherson; October 11, 1936 (age 90); Valley City, North Dakota, U.S.
- Occupation: Historian
- Spouse: Patricia McPherson
- Children: 1
- Awards: Pulitzer Prize; Lincoln Prize; Pritzker Military Library Literature Award

Academic background
- Education: Gustavus Adolphus College (BA); Johns Hopkins University (PhD)

Academic work
- Institutions: Princeton University
- Main interests: American Civil War
- Notable works: Battle Cry of Freedom (1988); For Cause and Comrades: Why Men Fought in the Civil War (1997)

James Munro McPherson (born October 11, 1936) is an American historian specializing in the American Civil War. He is the George Henry Davis '86 Professor Emeritus of United States History at Princeton University. He received the 1989 Pulitzer Prize for Battle Cry of Freedom: The Civil War Era. McPherson was the president of the American Historical Association in 2003.

== Early life and education ==
Born in Valley City, North Dakota, McPherson graduated from St. Peter High School in St. Peter, Minnesota, and received his Bachelor of Arts in 1958 from Gustavus Adolphus College, also in St. Peter, from which he graduated magna cum laude. He received his Ph.D. from Johns Hopkins University in 1963, where he studied under C. Vann Woodward.

== Career ==
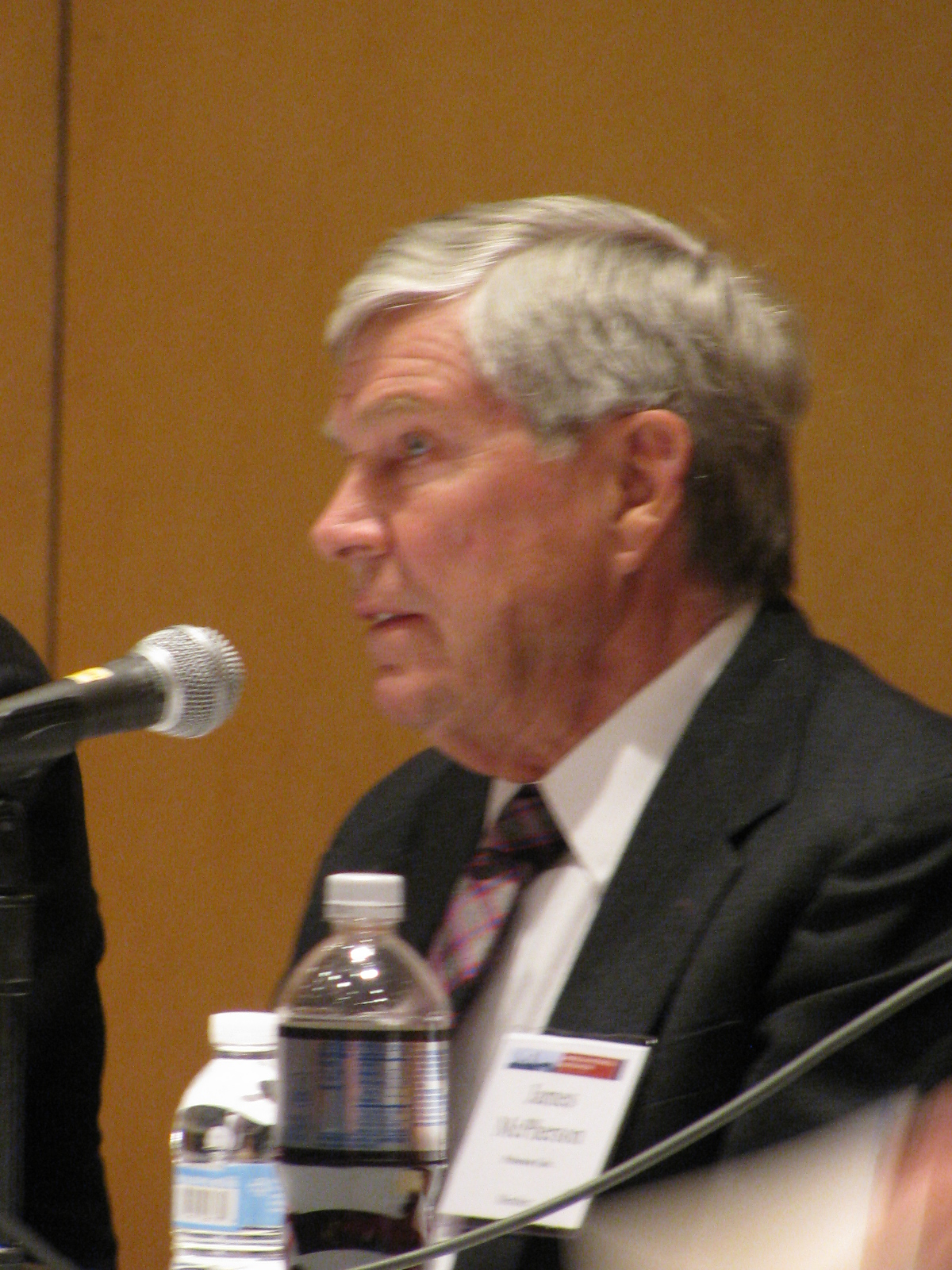
McPherson speaking at the American Historical Association annual meeting in January 2014

McPherson joined the faculty of Princeton in 1962. His works include The Struggle for Equality: Abolitionists and the Negro in the Civil War and Reconstruction, awarded the Anisfield-Wolf Award in 1965. In 1988, he published his Pulitzer-winning book, Battle Cry of Freedom: The Civil War Era. His 1990 book, Abraham Lincoln and the Second American Revolution argues that the emancipation of slaves amounts to a second American Revolution. McPherson's 1998 book, For Cause and Comrades: Why Men Fought in the Civil War, received the Lincoln Prize. In 2002, he published both a scholarly book, Crossroads of Freedom: Antietam 1862, and a history of the American Civil War for children, Fields of Fury.

In 2007, McPherson published This Mighty Scourge: Perspectives on the Civil War, a series of essays about the American Civil War. One essay describes the huge difficulty of negotiation when regime change is a war aim on either side of a conflict. "For at least the past two centuries, nations have usually found it harder to end a war than to start one. Americans learned that bitter lesson in Vietnam, and apparently having forgotten it, we're forced to learn it all over again in Iraq." One of McPherson's examples is the American Civil War, in which both the Union and the Confederacy sought regime change. It took four years to end the war.

There are all kinds of myths that a people has about itself, some positive, some negative, some healthy and some not healthy. I think that one job of the historian is to try to cut through some of those myths and get closer to some kind of reality. So that people can face their current situation realistically, rather than mythically. I guess that's my sense of what a historian ought to do.

— James M. McPherson, "An exchange with a Civil War historian", International Workers Bulletin (1995)

Among McPherson's other books are The Negro's Civil War: How American Blacks Felt and Acted During the War for the Union (1965), The Abolitionist Legacy: From Reconstruction to the NAACP (1975), and Drawn with the Sword: Reflections on the American Civil War (1996).

== Honors ==
McPherson was elected to the American Philosophical Society in 1991. In 1995, he received the Golden Plate Award of the American Academy of Achievement presented by Awards Council member David McCullough.

McPherson was named the 2000 Jefferson Lecturer in the humanities by the National Endowment for the Humanities. In making the announcement of McPherson's selection, NEH Chairman William R. Ferris said:

James M. McPherson has helped millions of Americans better understand the meaning and legacy of the American Civil War. By establishing the highest standards for scholarship and public education about the Civil War and by providing leadership in the movement to protect the nation's battlefields, he has made an exceptional contribution to historical awareness in America.

In 2002, McPherson received The Lincoln Forum's Richard Nelson Current Award of Achievement. In 2007, he was awarded the $100,000 Pritzker Military Library Literature Award for lifetime achievement in military history and was the first recipient of the prize. In 2007, he was awarded the Samuel Eliot Morison Prize for lifetime achievement in military history given by the Society for Military History. He was elected a Fellow of the American Academy of Arts and Sciences in 2009.

In 2009, he was the co-winner of the Lincoln Prize for Tried by War: Abraham Lincoln as Commander in Chief.

== Activism ==
External videos
- Interview with McPherson in his home library and office about his writing habits, October 8, 2008, C-SPAN
- Panel discussion hosted by the American Historical Association on the career of James McPherson, January 8, 2012, C-SPAN

McPherson is known for his outspokenness on contemporary issues and for his activism, such as his work on behalf of the preservation of Civil War battlefields. As president in 1993–1994 of Protect Historic America, he lobbied against the construction of a Disney theme park near Manassas battlefield. He has also served on the boards of the Civil War Trust as well as the Association for the Preservation of Civil War Sites, a predecessor to the Civil War Trust. From 1990 to 1993, he sat on the Civil War Sites Advisory Commission.

Along with several other historians, McPherson signed a May 2009 petition asking U.S. President Barack Obama not to lay a wreath at the Confederate Monument Memorial at Arlington National Cemetery. The petition stated:

The Arlington Confederate Monument is a denial of the wrong committed against African Americans by slave owners, Confederates, and neo-Confederates, through the monument's denial of slavery as the cause of secession and its holding up of Confederates as heroes. This implies that the humanity of Africans and African Americans is of no significance. Today, the monument gives encouragement to the modern neo-Confederate movement and provides a rallying point for them. The modern neo-Confederate movement interprets it as vindicating the Confederacy and the principles and ideas of the Confederacy and their neo-Confederate ideas. The presidential wreath enhances the prestige of these neo-Confederate events.

President Obama himself never addressed the issue. Instead, he sent a wreath not only to the Confederate Memorial but also instituted a new tradition of sending a presidential wreath to the African American Civil War Memorial in Washington, D.C. He also won the praise of the Sons of Confederate Veterans.

== Personal life ==
McPherson is married and has one child.

== Filmography ==
Year	Film	Role	Notes
1994	Civil War Journal	Himself	
2003	National Geographic: Beyond the Movie - The Lord of the Rings: Return of the King	Himself	
2011	The Conspirator: Mary Surratt and the Plot to Kill Lincoln	Himself	
2015	The Gettysburg Address	Himself	
