= Charles Royster =

American historian (1944–2020)

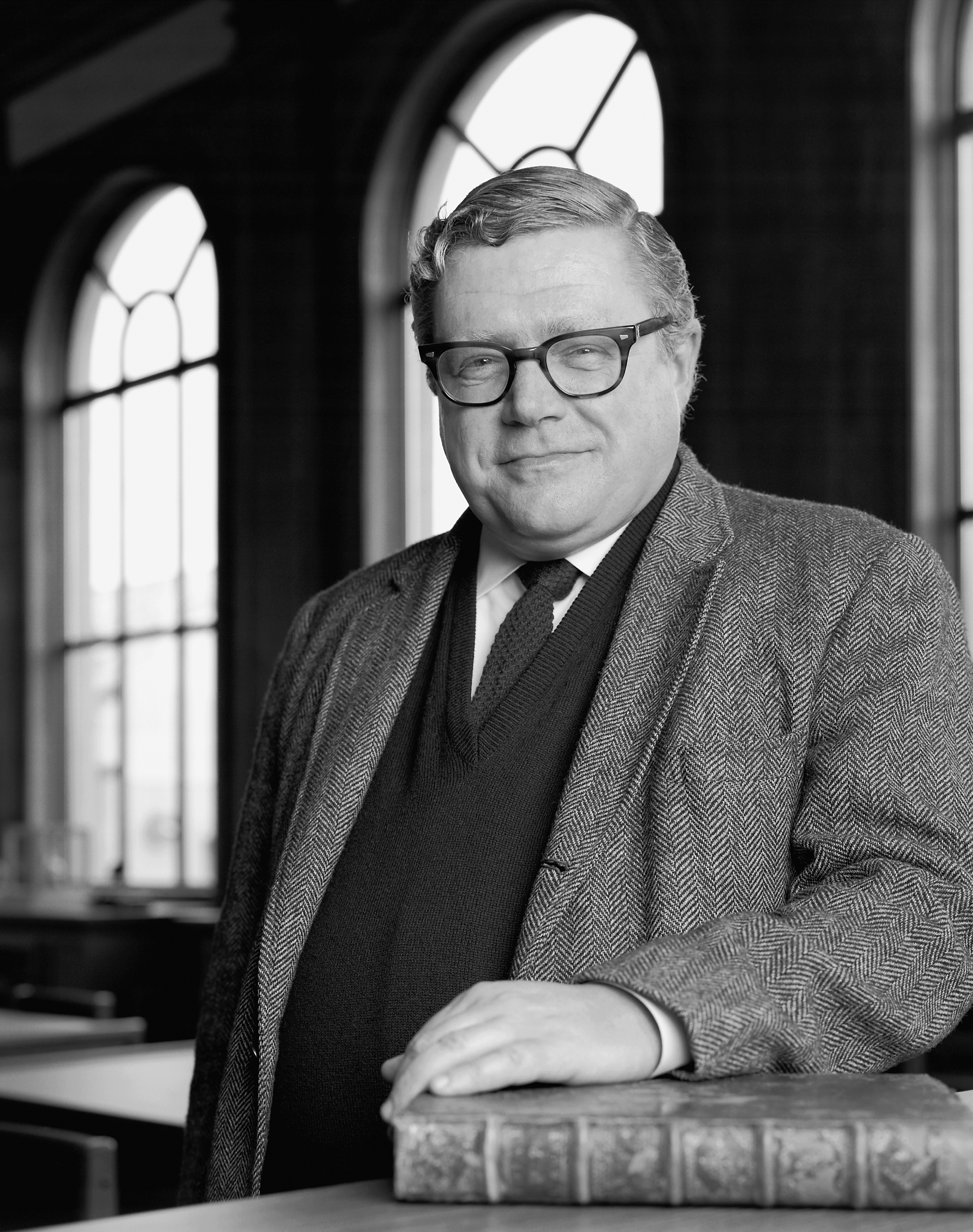
- Royster at LSU's Hill Memorial Library
- Born: Charles William Royster; November 27, 1944; Nashville, Tennessee, U.S.
- Died: February 6, 2020 (aged 75); Zachary, Louisiana, U.S.
- Education: University of California, Berkeley (AB, MA, PhD)
- Occupation: Historian
- Awards: Bancroft Prize (1992); Lincoln Prize (1992)

Charles William Royster (November 27, 1944 – February 6, 2020) was an American historian and a Boyd Professor at Louisiana State University.

== Life ==
He was born in Nashville, Tennessee, on November 27, 1944, the only son of Ferd Neuman Royster of Robards, Kentucky, a United Methodist minister, and Laura Jean (née Smotherman) Royster of Carthage, Tennessee, an elementary school teacher (both now deceased). He moved with his parents and younger sister from Atlanta, Georgia to California in 1954, where, with the exception of his military duty, he continued to maintain residence until accepting a post-doctoral fellowship at College of William & Mary in Williamsburg, Virginia, revising his dissertation for publication as his first book, A Revolutionary People at War. He was salutatorian of his high school graduating class in Dixon, California, as well as manager of the basketball team, founder and president of the Chess Club, and recipient of several academic scholarships, which financed his tuition at University of California, Berkeley, from which he graduated with an A.B. in 1966, an M.A. in 1967, and a Ph.D. in 1977. At Berkeley, he studied under Robert Middlekauff, a historian of the Revolutionary period. During his years of service to the United States Air Force, he was stationed in Thailand and Shreveport, Louisiana, being honorably discharged as a captain prior to beginning his doctoral program in history. He was also a member of Phi Beta Kappa national academic honor society and was a supporter of the Oregon Shakespeare Festival in Ashland, Oregon (to whom he dedicated one of his books) for the past four decades.

Royster was a resident of Baton Rouge, Louisiana. He died in Zachary, Louisiana, on February 6, 2020, aged 75.

== Awards and honors ==
- 1981 Francis Parkman Prize
- 1982 Guggenheim Fellow
- 1992 Bancroft Prize
- 1992 Lincoln Prize
- 1992 Charles Snydor Award
- Society of American Historians Fellow

== Works ==
- The Fabulous History of the Dismal Swamp Company. Borzoi Books. 1999. ISBN 978-0-679-43345-3.
- The Destructive War: William Tecumseh Sherman, Stonewall Jackson, and the Americans. Knopf. 1991. ISBN 978-0-394-52485-6.
- Light-Horse Harry Lee and the Legacy of the American Revolution. CUP Archive. 1982. ISBN 978-0-521-27065-6.
- A Revolutionary People at War. The University of North Carolina Press. 1979. ISBN 978-0-8078-4606-3. (reprint 1996)

=== Editor ===
- Ian Barnes (2000). Charles Royster (ed.). The historical atlas of the American Revolution. Routledge. ISBN 978-0-415-92243-2.
- James O'Neill (2006). Charles Royster (ed.). Garrison tales from Tonquin: an American's stories of the French Foreign Legion in Vietnam in the 1890s. LSU Press. ISBN 978-0-8071-3180-0.
