= For Cause and Comrades =

For Cause and Comrades: Why Men Fought in the Civil War
- Author: James M. McPherson
- Language: English
- Publisher: Oxford University Press
- Publication date: 1997; 29 years ago
- Publication place: United States
- Pages: 237
- ISBN: 9780195090239
- OCLC: 34912692

For Cause and Comrades: Why Men Fought in the Civil War is a book by the Pulitzer Prize–winning author James M. McPherson. The book was published by Oxford University Press in 1997 and covers the lives and ideals of American Civil War soldiers from both sides of the war. Drawing from a compilation of over 25,000 letters and 250 personal diaries, For Cause and Comrades tells the story of the American Civil War's soldiers through their own writings, emphasizing their own point of view.

== Overview ==
=== Confederate motivations ===
In the book, McPherson contrasts the views of the Confederates regarding slavery to that of the colonial-era American revolutionaries of the late 18th century. He stated that while the American colonists of the 1770s saw an incongruity with slave ownership and proclaiming to be fighting for liberty, the Confederates did not, as the Confederacy's overriding ideology of white supremacy negated any contradiction between the two:

Unlike many slaveholders in the age of Thomas Jefferson, Confederate soldiers from slaveholding families expressed no feelings of embarrassment or inconsistency in fighting for their own liberty while holding other people in slavery. Indeed, white supremacy and the right of property in slaves were at the core of the ideology for which Confederate soldiers fought.

— James M. McPherson, For Cause and Comrades: Why Men Fought in the Civil War (1997), p. 106, emphasis added.

McPherson states that the Confederates did not discuss the issue of slavery as often as Union soldiers did, because most Confederate soldiers readily accepted as an obvious fact that they were fighting to perpetuate slavery, and thus did not feel a need to debate over it:

[O]nly 20 percent of the sample of 429 Southern soldiers explicitly voiced proslavery convictions in their letters or diaries. As one might expect, a much higher percentage of soldiers from slaveholding families than from nonslaveholding families expressed such a purpose: 33 percent, compared with 12 percent. Ironically, the proportion of Union soldiers who wrote about the slavery question was greater, as the next chapter will show. There is a ready explanation for this apparent paradox. Emancipation was a salient issue for Union soldiers because it was controversial. Slavery was less salient for most Confederate soldiers because it was not controversial. They took slavery for granted as one of the Southern 'rights' and institutions for which they fought, and did not feel compelled to discuss it.

— James M. McPherson, For Cause and Comrades: Why Men Fought in the Civil War (1997), pp. 109–110, emphasis added.

Continuing, McPherson also stated that of the hundreds of Confederate soldiers' letters he read, none of them contained any anti-slavery sentiment whatsoever:

Although only 20 percent of the soldiers avowed explicit proslavery purposes in their letters and diaries, none at all dissented from that view.

— James M. McPherson, For Cause and Comrades: Why Men Fought in the Civil War (1997), p. 110, emphasis in original.

However, McPherson notes that in his sampling of letters, Confederates from slave-owning families were over-represented.

=== Union motivations ===
McPherson also examined the motivations behind Union soldiers and what drove them to fight for the United States in the war. He stated that although Union soldiers primarily fought to preserve the United States as a country, they fought to end slavery as well, stating that:

While restoration of the Union was the main goal for which they fought, they became convinced that this goal was unattainable without striking against slavery.

— James M. McPherson, For Cause and Comrades: Why Men Fought in the Civil War, (1997), p. 118, emphasis added.

== Reception ==
Reaction to the book was highly positive. According to the School Library Journal Review, "This powerful commentary by today's premier Civil War historian is truly compelling in its depth and intensity."

The School Library Journal Review also gave a favorable review, saying "McPherson uses these letters well: they not only support his arguments but provide the intensely human elements of fear, sickness, loneliness and exhaustion that make the question of motivations so poignant."

The Choice Review lauded the book as well, saying "McPherson offers a persuasive and provocative account of why Civil War soldiers fought."

=== Awards ===
For Cause and Comrades: Why Men Fought in the Civil War won the Lincoln Prize in 1998.

== See also ==
- Battle Cry of Freedom
