= Martha Hodes =

American historian (born 1958)

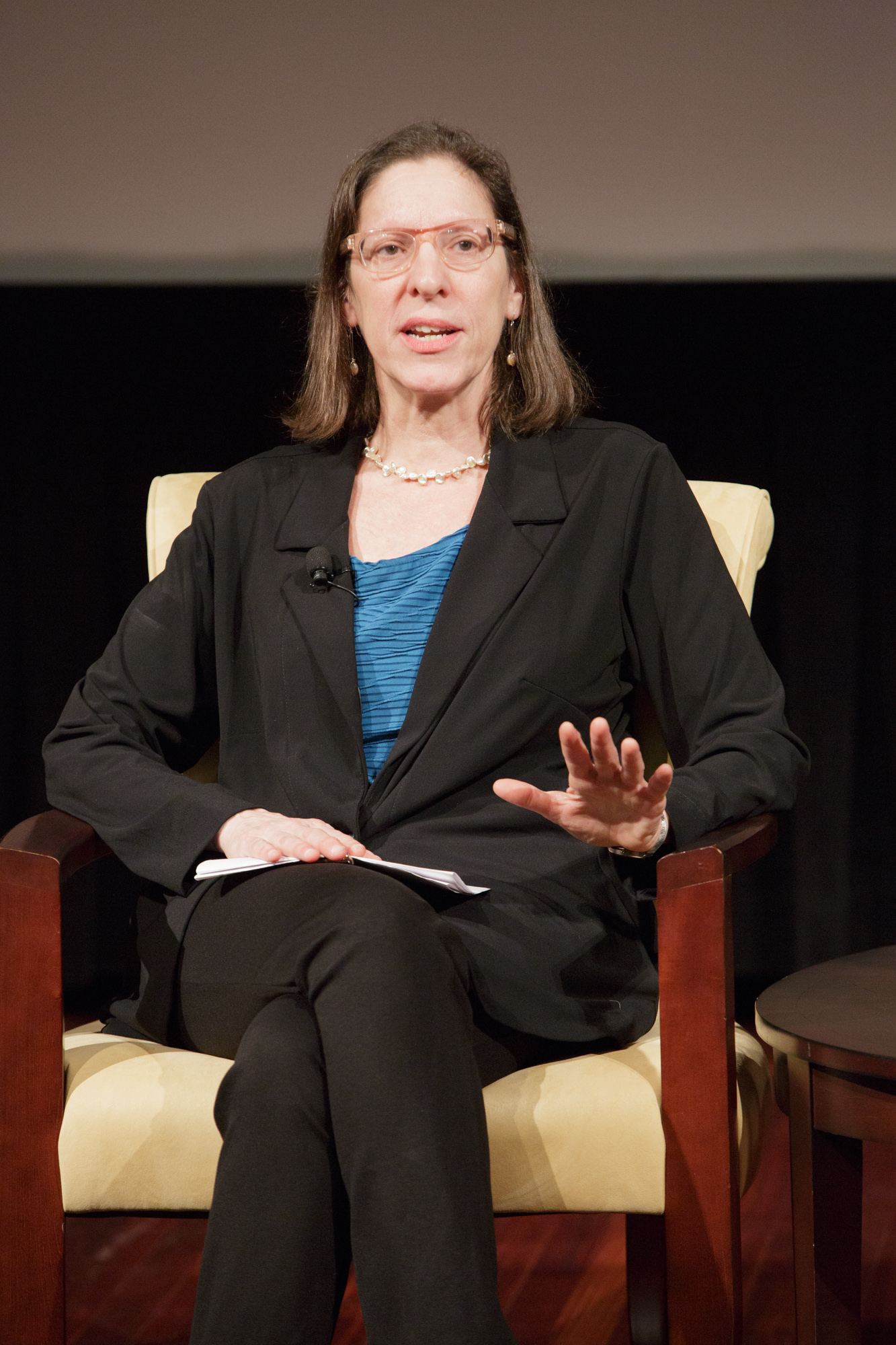
- Hodes in 2016
- Born: June 12, 1958 (age 68)

Academic background
- Education: BA, 1980, Bowdoin College; MA, 1984, Harvard University; PhD, 1987, Princeton University
- Thesis: Sex across the color line: white women and black men in the nineteenth-century American South

Academic work
- Institutions: New York University

Martha Elizabeth Hodes (born June 12, 1958) is an American historian. She is a professor of History at New York University, and the author of several books. She won the Lincoln Prize in 2016.

== Early life and education ==
Hodes was born on June 12, 1958. At the age of 12, she was taken hostage with her sister and hundreds of other people as part of the hijacking of TWA Flight 741 in September 1970. She and the rest of the hostages were eventually released.

She earned her Bachelor of Arts degree from Bowdoin College, her Master's degree from Harvard University and her PhD from Princeton University.

== Works ==
- White Women, Black Men: Illicit Sex in the Nineteenth-Century South. Yale University Press, 1997. ISBN 978-0300077506
- The Sea Captain’s Wife: A True Story of Love, Race, and War in the Nineteenth Century. W. W. Norton & Company, 2007. ISBN 978-0393330298
- Mourning Lincoln. Yale University Press, 2015. ISBN 978-0300219753
- My Hijacking: A Personal History of Forgetting and Remembering. Harper, 2023. ISBN 978-0062699817
