= Phillip S. Paludan =

American historian (1938–2007)

Phillip Shaw Paludan
- Born: January 26, 1938; St. Cloud, Minnesota, U.S.
- Died: August 1, 2007 (aged 69); Springfield, Illinois, U.S.
- Occupation: Professor

Phillip Shaw Paludan (January 26, 1938 – August 1, 2007) was a professor of Lincoln Studies at the University of Illinois Springfield, and a leading authority on the life and presidency of Abraham Lincoln.

He was born in St. Cloud, Minnesota, the son of Paul and Marguerite Shaw Paludan. Receiving his BA and MA degrees from Occidental College, he took his doctorate from the University of Illinois, where he studied under Harold M. Hyman. He taught at the University of Kansas for more than thirty years, and held visiting appointments at Rutgers University-Camden and University College, Dublin, Ireland. During this period he wrote four books on Lincoln and the Civil War era: A Covenant With Death: The Constitution, Law, and Equality in the Civil War Era, (Illinois, 1975), Victims: True Story Civil War (1981), A People's Contest: The Union and Civil War 1861-1865 (Harper & Row, 1988), and The Presidency of Abraham Lincoln (Kansas, 1994).

He received the Lincoln Prize for his study of Lincoln's presidency, as well as the Barondess Lincoln Award from the New York City Civil War Round Table. His numerous other awards include post doctoral fellowships from the American Council of Learned Societies, the Guggenheim Foundation, the National Endowment for the Humanities, and Harvard Law School. He has also received a Diploma of Honor from Lincoln Memorial University and an honorary doctorate from Lincoln College.

Paludan was named Distinguished Chair in Lincoln Studies at the University of Illinois Springfield, in 2001. He died August 1, 2007, after a long illness in Springfield, Illinois.
