= Allen C. Guelzo =

American historian (born 1953)

Allen Carl Guelzo
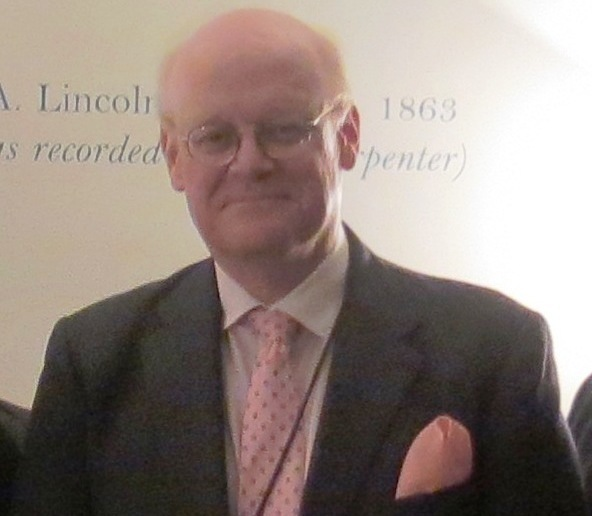
- Guelzo in January 2013
- Born: February 2, 1953 (age 73); Yokohama, Japan
- Occupation: Senior Research Scholar
- Children: 3

Academic background
- Education: Cairn University (BS); Reformed Episcopal Seminary (MDiv); University of Pennsylvania (MA, PhD)

Academic work
- Discipline: History
- Institutions: Princeton University; University of Florida
- Notable works: Gettysburg: The Last Invasion

Allen Carl Guelzo (born 1953) is an American historian who is the Thomas W. Smith Distinguished Research Scholar at Princeton University, where he is also the director of the Initiative on Politics and Statesmanship at the James Madison Institute. He formerly was a professor of history at Gettysburg College.

== Early life and education ==
Guelzo was born in Yokohama, Japan. His father was a soldier in the U.S. Army who was stationed there during the occupation of Japan.

Guelzo grew up in Pennsylvania. He graduated from Cairn University with a Bachelor of Science in biblical studies and earned a Master of Divinity from the Reformed Episcopal Seminary, where he later taught church history. Despite resistance from history faculty who were reluctant to admit or promote a scholar with religious background and interests, he continued to the University of Pennsylvania where he earned an M.A. and Ph.D. in history.

== Career ==
Guelzo joined the History department of Eastern University (St. Davids, Pennsylvania) in 1991. He was the Grace F. Kea Professor of American History at Eastern, where he was also Moderator of the Faculty Senate (1996–98). From 1998 to 2004, he served as Dean of the Templeton Honors College at Eastern. He joined the History department at Gettysburg College in 2004.

=== Academic focus ===
Guelzo's principal specialty is American intellectual history, from 1750 to 1865. His doctoral dissertation, "The Unanswered Question: Jonathan Edwards's 'Freedom of the Will' in Early American Religious Philosophy", was published in 1989 as Edwards On the Will: A Century of American Philosophical Debate, 1750–1850, by Wesleyan University Press, and won an American Library Association Choice Award. In 1995, he contributed a volume in the St. Martin's Press American History textbook series, The Crisis of the American Republic: A New History of the Civil War and Reconstruction.

One of Guelzo's early works, For the Union of Evangelical Christendom: The Irony of the Reformed Episcopalians, 1873–1930, won the Albert C. Outler Prize in Ecumenical Church History from the American Society of Church History in 1993. He began work in 1996 on an 'intellectual biography' of Lincoln, Abraham Lincoln: Redeemer President (1999), which won the Lincoln Prize for 2000 and the 2000 Book Prize of the Abraham Lincoln Institute. He followed this with Lincoln's Emancipation Proclamation: The End of Slavery in America (2004), which became the first two-time winner of the Lincoln Prize (for 2005) and the Book Prize of the Lincoln Institute. Guelzo won his third Lincoln Prize for his book Gettysburg: The Last Invasion (2013), making him the first three-time recipient of the prize.

His interest in the American Civil War was partially motivated by his grandmother, who had attended lectures by the Grand Army of the Republic as a child.

Guelzo differs from most contemporary scholars of the American Civil War in that he disagrees with the "self-emancipation" thesis, which posits that the Confederates' slaves freed themselves during the war. He cites ex-slaves who testified that Lincoln, specifically his Emancipation Proclamation, was responsible for freeing them. In addition, Guelzo does not consider Lincoln to have been a competent military commander during his presidency and considers several military decisions he made to have been unsound.

In addition to those books, he has produced editions of Manning Ferguson Force's From Fort Henry to Corinth (1989) and Josiah Gilbert Holland's Life of Abraham Lincoln (1998). He also co-edited a volume of essays on Jonathan Edwards, Edwards in Our Time: Jonathan Edwards and the Shaping of American Religion (with Sang Hyun Lee, 1999) and an anthology of primary sources on New England theology from 1750 to 1850, The New England Theology: From Jonathan Edwards to Edwards Amasa Park (with Douglas A. Sweeney, 2006). His books include Lincoln and Douglas: The Debates That Defined America (2008); Abraham Lincoln as a Man of Ideas (2009), a collection of his previously published essays; and Lincoln (2009), a volume in Oxford University Press's "Very Short Introduction" series.

=== Criticism and commentary ===
Matthew Pinsker notes that Guelzo, with his religious training, often emphasizes religious themes that other historians have neglected. Guelzo argues that Lincoln championed the cause of individual rights partly because of his profound fatalism and what Guelzo identifies as "a lifelong dalliance with Old School Calvinism."

Guelzo created a controversy among younger historians of the Civil War when Earl J. Hess reported that Guelzo believed that scholarly blogging was "entirely negative. I consider blogging to be a pernicious waste of scholarly time."

Rachel Shelden has noted that Guelzo's Fateful Lightning: A New History of the Civil War and Reconstruction (2012) is heavily focused on Lincoln. She asserts that little in the book is new, and much is based on old-fashioned historiography. She says he underplays the recent scholarship on the home front, environmental concerns, and medical issues and gives only cursory attention to the black experience or to the complexities of Reconstruction.

In 2019, Guelzo denounced The 1619 Project as "polemic," "conspiracy theory," "ignorance," and "evangelism for a gospel of disenchantment whose ultimate purpose is the hollowing out of the meaning of freedom."

In 2020, Guelzo participated in the White House Conference on American History, for which he was criticized by other historians. He responded by writing, "I will take the opportunity of any platform offered me short of outright tyrants, depraved fools and genocidal murderers to talk about American history." Guelzo did not serve on the subsequent 1776 Commission, whose membership did not include any historians.

=== Affiliations ===
Guelzo has been an American Council of Learned Societies Fellow (1991–1992), a visiting research fellow at the McNeil Center for Early American Studies at the University of Pennsylvania (1992–1993), a Fellow of the Charles Warren Center for the Study of American History at Harvard University (1994–1995), and a visiting fellow, Department of Politics, Princeton University (2002–2003 and 2010–2011). He was appointed by President George W. Bush to the National Council on the Humanities in 2006. He is a board member of the Abraham Lincoln Association. Guelzo is also a senior fellow of the conservative think tank, the Claremont Institute.

== Awards and honors ==
Guelzo received the 2013 Guggenheim-Lehrman Prize in Military History for Gettysburg: The Last Invasion at an awards ceremony in New York on March 17, 2014.

Guelzo was inducted as a Laureate of The Lincoln Academy of Illinois and awarded the Order of Lincoln (the State's highest honor) by the governor of Illinois in 2009 as a Bicentennial Laureate.

Guelzo was a recipient of the 2018 Bradley Prize for his "contributions [which] have shaped important debate, thought and research on one of the most critical periods of American history."

== Personal life ==
Guelzo has two daughters and a son who is a career army officer.

In 1980, Guelzo was ordained as a presbyter in the Reformed Episcopal Church, about which he wrote a history early in his career. In 1997, his orders were transferred by letters dimissory to the Episcopal Diocese of Pennsylvania.

== Publications ==
- Guelzo, Allen C. (1989). Edwards on the Will: A Century of Theological Debate. Middletown, Conn: Wesleyan University Press. ISBN 978-0-8195-5193-1.
- Guelzo, Allen C. (1994). For the Union of Evangelical Christendom: The Irony of the Reformed Episcopalians. University Park: Pennsylvania State University Press. ISBN 978-0-271-01002-1.
- Guelzo, Allen C. (1995). The Crisis of the American Republic: A History of the Civil War and Reconstruction Era. New York: St. Martin's Press. ISBN 978-0-312-09515-4.
- Holland, J. (1998). Holland's Life of Abraham Lincoln. Introduction by Allen C. Guelzo. Lincoln: University of Nebraska Press. ISBN 978-0-8032-7303-0.
- Guelzo, Allen C. "Defending Emancipation: Abraham Lincoln and the Conkling Letter, 1863". Civil War History (2002) 48 #4 pp. 313–337
- Guelzo, Allen C. (2003). Abraham Lincoln: Redeemer President (Library of Religious Biography). Wm. B. Eerdmans Publishing Company. ISBN 978-08028-3872-8. Second edition (2022) ISBN 9780802878588
- Guelzo, Allen C. (2004). Lincoln's Emancipation Proclamation: The End of Slavery in America. New York: Simon & Schuster. ISBN 978-0-7432-2182-5.
- Guelzo, Allen C.; Sweeney, Douglas A. (2006). The New England Theology: From Jonathan Edwards to Edwards Amasa Park. Grand Rapids, Mich: Baker Academic. ISBN 978-0-8010-2709-3.
- Guelzo, Allen C. "Abraham Lincoln and the Development of the 'War Powers' of the Presidency". The Federal Lawyer, November/December 2007, pp. 42–49.
- Guelzo, Allen C. (2008). Lincoln and Douglas: The Debates That Defined America. New York: Simon & Schuster. ISBN 978-0-7432-7320-6.
- Guelzo, Allen C. (2009). Abraham Lincoln as a Man of Ideas. Carbondale: Southern Illinois University Press. ISBN 978-0-8093-2861-1.
- Guelzo, Allen C. (2009). Lincoln: A Very Short Introduction. Oxford University Press, USA. ISBN 978-0-19-536780-5.
- Guelzo, Allen C. (2012). Fateful Lightning: A New History of the Civil War and Reconstruction. New York: Oxford University Press. ISBN 978-0-19-984328-2.
- Guelzo, Allen C. (2013). Gettysburg: The Last Invasion. Knopf. ISBN 978-0-307-59408-2.
- Guelzo, Allen C. (2016). Redeeming the Great Emancipator. Nathan I. Huggins Lectures. ISBN 978-0-674-286115.
- Guelzo, Allen C. (2018). Reconstruction: A Concise History. Oxford University Press. ISBN 978-0-1908-6569-6.
- Guelzo, Allen C. (2020). Reconstruction: A Very Short Introduction. Oxford University Press. ISBN 978-0190454791.
- Guelzo, Allen C. (2021). Robert E. Lee: A Life. Knopf. ISBN 978-1101946220.
- Guelzo, Allen C. (2024). Our Ancient Faith: Lincoln, Democracy, and the American Experiment. Knopf. ISBN 978-0593534441.
- Guelzo, Allen C.; Hankins, James (2025). The Golden Thread: A History of the Western Tradition, Volume I: The Ancient World and Christendom. Encounter Books. ISBN 978-1641773997.
- Guelzo, Allen C.; Hankins, James (2026). The Golden Thread: A History of the Western Tradition, Volume II: The Modern and Contemporary West. Encounter Books. ISBN 978-1641774017.
