= James Oakes (historian) =

American historian (born 1953)

- Born: December 19, 1953 (age 72); Bronx, New York City, New York, U.S.
- Employer: CUNY Graduate Center

James Oakes (born December 19, 1953) is an American historian, and is a Distinguished Professor of History and Graduate School Humanities Professor at the Graduate Center of the City University of New York where he teaches courses on the American Civil War and Reconstruction, Slavery, the Old South, Abolitionism, and U.S. and World History. He taught previously at Princeton University and Northwestern University.

== Career ==
Oakes' book The Radical and the Republican: Frederick Douglass, Abraham Lincoln, and the Triumph of Antislavery Politics (2007) was a co-winner of the 2008 Lincoln Prize. The prize jury highlighted the book's use of a new comparative framework for understanding the careers of Abraham Lincoln and Frederick Douglass, and their respective views of race. It also noted that Oakes had succeeded in writing a scholarly work that was accessible to the general public.

His more recent work focuses on emancipation and how it was implemented throughout the Southern states. In 2013 Oakes published Freedom National: The Destruction of Slavery in the United States, 1861–1865, which garnered him a second Lincoln Prize (2013). David Brion Davis, writing in The New York Review of Books, identified the basic theme of Freedom National as the view that Lincoln's Republican Party had been an antislavery party both before and during the war, one that viewed defining humans as chattel as both a violation of the "freedom principle" embodied in natural and international law and a violation of the U.S. Constitution, which, in the Fugitive Slave Clause, referred to slaves as "Person[s] held to Service or Labour". In Freedom National (page xxiii), Oakes wrote, "Like most historians I always believed that the purpose of the war shifted 'from Union to emancipation.'" But, in fact, although "Republicans did not believe that the Constitution allowed them to wage a war for any 'purpose' other than the restoration of the Union, ... from the very beginning they insisted that slavery was the cause of the rebellion and emancipation an appropriate and ultimately indispensable means of suppressing it." Eric Foner called the work "the best account ever written of the complex historical process known as emancipation".

Oakes' 2021 book, The Crooked Path to Abolition, won The Harold Holzer Lincoln Forum Book Prize in 2021.

== Works ==
- The Ruling Race: A History of American Slaveholders (1982)
- "Slavery as an American Problem", in Larry J. Griffin; Don H. Doyle, eds. (1995). The South as an American Problem. The University of Georgia Press. p. 83. ISBN 978-0-8203-1752-6.
- Slavery and Freedom: An Interpretation of the Old South. W. W. Norton & Company. 1998. ISBN 978-0-393-31766-4.
- The Radical and the Republican: Frederick Douglass, Abraham Lincoln, and the Triumph of Antislavery Politics. W. W. Norton & Company. 2007. ISBN 978-0-393-33065-6. Review
- "Natural Rights, Citizenship Rights, States' Rights, and Black Rights: Another Look at Lincoln and Race", in Foner, Eric, ed. Our Lincoln: New Perspectives on Lincoln and His World. W. W. Norton & Co., 2008. ISBN 978-0-393-06756-9
- Freedom National: The Destruction of Slavery in the United States, 1861-1865 (2013)
- The Scorpion's Sting: Antislavery and the Coming of the Civil War (2014)
- "When Everybody Knew", in David W. Blight and Jim Downs, eds. (2017). Beyond Freedom: Disrupting the History of Emancipation. The University of Georgia Press. pp. 104–117. ISBN 9780820351483
- The Crooked Path to Abolition: Abraham Lincoln and the Antislavery Constitution (2021)
- "Foreword", in Randy Barnett and Evan Bernick (2021). The Original Meaning of the 14th Amendment: Its Letter and Spirit. The Belknap Press of Harvard University Press.
