= Lincoln Prize =

Annual prize recognizing American Civil War scholarship

Gilder Lehrman Lincoln Prize
- Description: Awarded for the finest scholarly work in English on Abraham Lincoln, the American Civil War soldier, or the American Civil War era
- Country: United States
- Presented by: Gilder Lehrman Institute for American History

The Gilder Lehrman Lincoln Prize, founded by the late Richard Gilder and Lewis Lehrman in partnership with Gabor Boritt, Director Emeritus of the Civil War Institute at Gettysburg College, is administered by the Gilder Lehrman Institute for American History. It has been awarded annually since 1991 for "the finest scholarly work in English on Abraham Lincoln, the American Civil War soldier, or the American Civil War era."

== Laureates ==
The prize has been split equally between two entries on six occasions (1992, 2000, 2008, 2009, 2012, and 2014). Recipients of the $50,000 prize have included:

Year	Author	Winning Title
1991	Ken Burns	The Civil War
1992	William S. McFeely	Frederick Douglass
1992	Charles Royster	The Destructive War: William Tecumseh Sherman, Stonewall Jackson, and the Americans
1993	Kenneth Stampp	The Peculiar Institution
1994	Ira Berlin, Barbara Fields, Steven Miller, Joseph Reidy, Leslie Rowland, eds.	Free at Last: A Documentary History of Slavery, Freedom, and the Civil War
1995	Phillip Shaw Paludan	The Presidency of Abraham Lincoln
1996	David Herbert Donald	Lincoln
1997	Don Fehrenbacher	Prelude to Greatness: Lincoln in the 1850s and The Dred Scott Case: Its Significance in American Law and Politics
1998	James M. McPherson	For Cause and Comrades: Why Men Fought in the Civil War
1999	Douglas L. Wilson	Honor's Voice: The Transformation of Abraham Lincoln
2000	John Hope Franklin and Loren Schweninger	Runaway Slaves: Rebels in the Plantation
2000	Allen C. Guelzo	Abraham Lincoln: Redeemer President
2001	Russell F. Weigley	A Great Civil War: A Military and Political History, 1861-1865
2002	David W. Blight	Race and Reunion: The Civil War in American Memory
2003	George C. Rable	Fredericksburg! Fredericksburg!
2004	Richard Carwardine	Lincoln: A Life of Purpose and Power
2005	Allen C. Guelzo	Lincoln's Emancipation Proclamation
2006	Doris Kearns Goodwin	Team of Rivals: The Political Genius of Abraham Lincoln
2007	Douglas L. Wilson	Lincoln's Sword: The Presidency and the Power of Words
2008	James Oakes	The Radical and the Republican: Frederick Douglass, Abraham Lincoln, and the Triumph of Antislavery Politics
2008	Elizabeth Brown Pryor	Reading the Man: A Portrait of Robert E. Lee through his Private Letters
2009	James M. McPherson	Tried by War: Abraham Lincoln as Commander in Chief
2009	Craig Symonds	Lincoln and His Admirals: Abraham Lincoln, the U.S. Navy, and the Civil War
2010	Michael Burlingame	Abraham Lincoln: A Life
2011	Eric Foner	The Fiery Trial: Abraham Lincoln and American Slavery
2012	Elizabeth D. Leonard	Lincoln's Forgotten Ally: Judge Advocate General Joseph Holt of Kentucky
2012	William C. Harris	Lincoln and the Border States
2013	James Oakes	Freedom National: The Destruction of Slavery in the United States, 1861-1865
2014	Allen C. Guelzo	Gettysburg: The Last Invasion
2014	Martin P. Johnson	Writing the Gettysburg Address
2015	Harold Holzer	Lincoln and the Power of the Press: The War for Public Opinion
2016	Martha Hodes	Mourning Lincoln
2017	James B. Conroy; Douglas R. Egerton	Conroy, Lincoln's White House: The People's House in Wartime Egerton, Thunder at the Gates: The Black Civil War Regiments That Redeemed America
2018	Edward L. Ayers	The Thin Light of Freedom: The Civil War and Emancipation in the Heart of America
2019	David W. Blight	Frederick Douglass: Prophet of Freedom
2020	Elizabeth R. Varon	Armies of Deliverance: A New History of the Civil War
2021	David S. Reynolds	Abe: Abraham Lincoln in His Times
2022	Caroline E. Janney	Ends of War: The Unfinished Fight of Lee's Army after Appomattox
2023	Jon Meacham; Jonathan White	Meacham, And There Was Light: Abraham Lincoln and the American Struggle White, A House Built By Slaves: African American Visitors to the Lincoln White House
2024	Frances M. Clarke and Rebecca Jo Plant	Of Age: Boy Soldiers and Military Power in the Civil War Era
2025	Edda L. Fields-Black	COMBEE: Harriet Tubman, the Combahee River Raid, and Black Freedom during the Civil War
2026	Richard Carwardine	Righteous Strife: How Religious Nationalists Forged Lincoln’s Union

== See also ==
- Gilder Lehrman Institute of American History
- American Civil War
