= George C. Rable =

American historian and author

George C. Rable is an American historian and author. He is Professor Emeritus at the University of Alabama. He received the Lincoln Prize in 2003 for his 2002 book Fredericksburg! Fredericksburg!

== Education ==
Rable received a Bachelor of Arts degree from Bluffton College in 1972 and a Master of Arts degree from Louisiana State University in 1973. He received his doctoral degree from LSU in 1978.

== Career ==
Rable is a past president of the Society of Civil War Historians. At the University of Alabama he received the Burnum Distinguished Faculty Award and the Blackmon-Moody Award.

His 2002 book Fredericksburg! Fredericksburg! received the 2003 Lincoln Prize, a $50,000 award for excellence in Civil War scholarship. The book includes a traditional military analysis of the Civil War while also exploring the social context of the conflict. The book was also awarded the Jefferson Davis Award and the Douglas Southall Freeman Award and the Society for Military History's Distinguished Book Award in American Military History.

His book God's Almost Chosen Peoples: A Religious History of the American Civil War (2010) won the Jefferson Davis Award and was a Choice Outstanding Academic Title.

== Publications ==
- But There Was No Peace: The Role of Violence in the Politics of Reconstruction. Athens: University of Georgia Press, 1984.
- Civil Wars: Women and the Crisis of Southern Nationalism. Urbana: University of Illinois Press, 1989. ISBN 0252015975 OCLC 18290214
- A Revolution against Politics: The Confederate States of America. Chapel Hill: University of North Carolina Press, 1994. ISBN 0807821446 OCLC 232667648
- News from Fredericksburg. Milwaukee: Marquette University Press, 2000. ISBN 0874623332 OCLC 44926859
- Fredericksburg! Fredericksburg! Chapel Hill: University of North Carolina Press, 2002. ISBN 0807826731 OCLC 46952293
- God's Almost Chosen Peoples: A Religious History of the American Civil War. Chapel Hill: University of North Carolina Press, 2010. ISBN 9780807834268 OCLC 607975631
- Damn Yankees!: Demonization & Defiance in the Confederate South. Baton Rouge: Louisiana State University Press, 2015. ISBN 9780807160589 OCLC 908373817
- Conflict of Command: George B. McClellan, Abraham Lincoln, and the Politics of War. Baton Rouge: Louisiana State University Press, 2023. ISBN 978-0807179772
