= Peter S. Carmichael =

American historian (1966–2024)

- Born: February 23, 1966
- Died: July 21, 2024 (aged 58)
- Education: Indiana University–Purdue University Indianapolis; The Pennsylvania State University
- Occupation: Robert C. Fluhrer Professor of Civil War Studies
- Employer: Gettysburg College
- Organization: Civil War Institute
- Predecessor: Gabor Boritt

Peter S. Carmichael (February 23, 1966 – July 21, 2024) was an American historian at Gettysburg College who served as Robert C. Fluhrer Professor of Civil War Studies and Director of the Civil War Institute at Gettysburg College. His research and teaching focused on the American Civil War, the American South and public history.

== Background ==
Carmichael received his B.A. from Indiana University–Purdue University Indianapolis in 1988 and completed his graduate work under Gary W. Gallagher at The Pennsylvania State University, where he received his PhD in 1996.

== Career ==
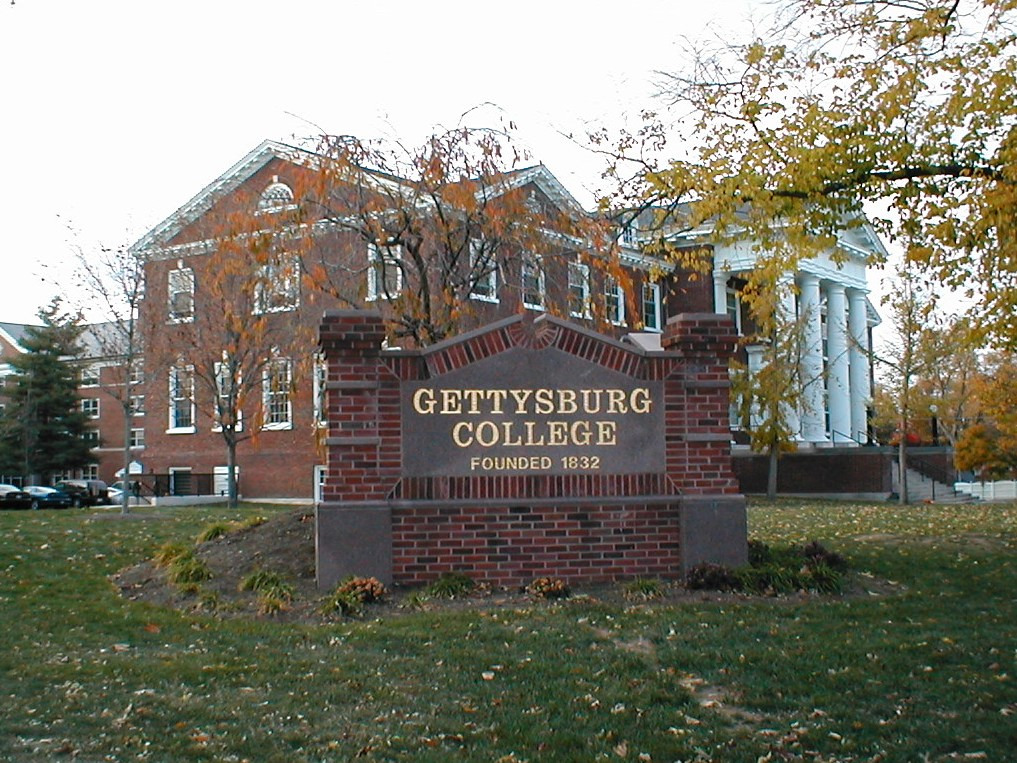
Gettysburg College, where Carmichael taught from 2010 until 2024

Carmichael began his academic career at Western Carolina University in 1997. He was the first Scholar-in-Residence at Gettysburg National Military Park in 1999. He went on to teach at The University of North Carolina at Greensboro and West Virginia University before coming to Gettysburg College as Robert C. Fluhrer Professor of Civil War Studies and Director of the Civil War Institute at Gettysburg College in 2010.

When he took charge of the Civil War Institute, Carmichael sought to create more intimate environments during the institute's annual summer conference, attended by over 200 people each year, to allow scholars to work with the public in smaller settings.

Carmichael also served on the board of directors and the Historians' Council of the Gettysburg Foundation, the non-profit partner of Gettysburg National Military Park. He was reappointed a Distinguished Lecturer for the Organization of American Historians for 2017–2018.

Carmichael was co-editor of the Civil War America series from The University of North Carolina Press.

== Personal life and death ==
Carmichael and his wife Beth had twin daughters, Isabel and Cameron. He was a fan of the Indianapolis Colts and attended their first preseason game following their relocation from Baltimore in 1984.

Carmichael died on July 21, 2024, from complications due to respiratory illness, at the age of 58.

== Bibliography ==
- The Purcell, Crenshaw & Letcher Artillery. Lynchburg: H. E. Howard, Inc., 1991.
- Lee's Young Artillerist: William R.J. Pegram. Charlottesville: University of Virginia Press, 1995.
- Audacity Personified: The Generalship of Robert E. Lee (editor). Baton Rouge: Louisiana State University Press, 2004.
- The Last Generation: Young Virginians in Peace, War, and Reunion. Chapel Hill: The University of North Carolina Press, 2009.
- The War for the Common Soldier: How Men Thought, Fought, and Survived in Civil War Armies. Chapel Hill: The University of North Carolina Press, 2018.
