= Harold Holzer =

American academic (born 1949)

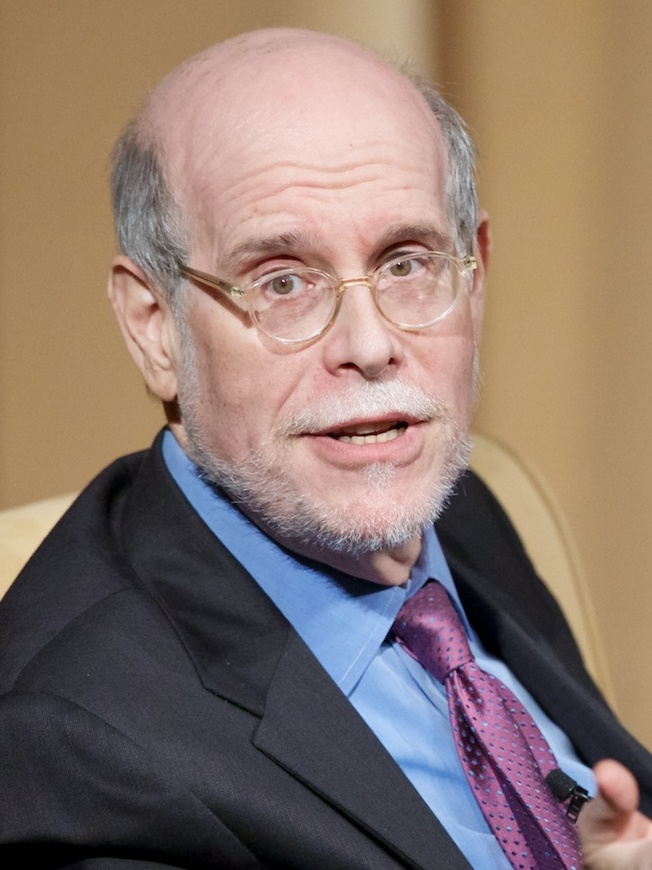
- Holzer in 2014
- Born: February 5, 1949 (age 77)
- Education: Queens College of the City University of New York (BA)
- Known for: Scholar of Abraham Lincoln
- Spouse: Edith Spiegel

Harold Holzer (born February 5, 1949) is a scholar of Abraham Lincoln and the political culture of the American Civil War Era. He serves as director of Hunter College's Roosevelt House Public Policy Institute. Holzer previously spent twenty-three years as senior vice president for external affairs at The Metropolitan Museum of Art in New York before retiring in 2015.

== Early life and education ==
Holzer was born on February 5, 1949, in Brooklyn, New York to Charles and Rose Holzer, a construction contractor and homemaker, respectively. He attended Queens College of the City University of New York where he earned a Bachelor of Arts in 1969. Holzer married Edith Spiegel, a writer/publicist, in 1971. They have two children, Remy and Meg. Holzer is Jewish.

== Career ==
Holzer began his career as a newspaper reporter and then editor of The Manhattan Tribune. He then served as press secretary to Congresswoman Bella S. Abzug (both on Capitol Hill and in campaigns for the U.S. Senate and mayor of New York), as press secretary to 1977 mayoral candidate Mario Cuomo, as a government speechwriter for New York City Mayor Abraham D. Beame, and for six years as public affairs director for the PBS flagship station, WNET. From 1984 through 1992 Holzer worked in the administration of Governor Mario Cuomo (with whom he co-edited the 1990 book, Lincoln on Democracy).

In 1992, Holzer joined The Metropolitan Museum of Art in New York as chief communications officer. He was elevated to vice president in 1996 and senior vice president in 2005 with responsibilities over government affairs, multi-cultural development, admissions, and visitor services. He then served as a trustee of The Metropolitan Museum representing the New York City Comptroller. Since 2015, Holzer has served as director of Hunter College's Roosevelt House Public Policy Institute.

=== History and Lincoln scholarship ===
In his work as a historian Holzer has authored, co-authored, and edited 56 books and contributed more than 600 articles to magazines and journals, plus chapters and forewords for 71 additional books. Many of his works have received awards, including the Gilder Lehrman Lincoln Prize and four other awards in 2015 for his book Lincoln and the Power of the Press.

In a 2000 review written for but not published by The Journal of American History because the editor found that it "clouds more than clarifies the issues", Lincoln scholar Michael Burlingame charged Holzer with errors in citation and transcription in Holzer's book, The Lincoln Mailbag: America Writes to the President, 1861-1896. Holzer responded by charging that Burlingame had "riven the Lincoln field, and made it unpleasant to contribute scholarship. He's the Torquemada of academic plagiarism."

Holzer served for nine years as co-chairman of the United States Abraham Lincoln Bicentennial Commission (ALBC), appointed to the commission by President Bill Clinton in 2000 and elected co-chair by his fellow commissioners. In June 2010, he was elected chairman of the ALBC's successor organization, The Abraham Lincoln Bicentennial Foundation, which he led through 2016. Holzer has served as president of the Lincoln Group of New York, on the board of directors of the Abraham Lincoln Association and New York's Civil War Round Table, and on the editorial advisory boards of The Lincoln Herald, American Heritage, and Civil War Times. He was the founding vice chairman of The Lincoln Forum and has served since 2018 as chairman. From 2012 to 2015, Holzer served as a Roger Hertog Fellow at the New-York Historical Society. In 2016-17 he served as Distinguished Visiting Scholar at The Zahava and Moshael Straus Center for Torah and Western Thought at Yeshiva University. He was also a script consultant to the Steven Spielberg film, Lincoln, and wrote the official young readers' companion book to the movie.

A frequent guest on television, Holzer has appeared on C-SPAN's Washington Journal and its 2009 documentary special on The White House. He has also appeared on The History Channel, PBS, The Today Show, Bill Moyers Journal, CBS Sunday Morning, Morning Joe, The Lou Dobbs Show, History Detectives, and The Charlie Rose Show. C-SPAN has broadcast Holzer's stage presentation "Lincoln Seen and Heard" with Sam Waterston and "Grant Seen and Heard" with Richard Dreyfuss among many others. In February 2005, President and Mrs. Bush hosted a special Lincoln's birthday-eve performance of "Lincoln Seen and Heard" with Holzer and Waterston, telecast live from the White House. During the Lincoln bicentennial, he appeared on such documentaries as "Stealing Lincoln's Body," "The Lincoln Assassination," "Looking for Lincoln," and "Lincoln: American Mastermind." Holzer is featured in Sean Conant's documentary film, The Gettysburg Address, alongside Matthew Broderick, Laura Bush, and Tom Brokaw.

Holzer also lectures throughout the country, and has curated seven museum exhibitions, including three shows of Lincoln art at the former Lincoln Museum in Fort Wayne, Indiana. He served as chief historian for the exhibition "Lincoln and New York" at the New-York Historical Society, October 2009-March 2010, and "Lincoln and The Jews," March–June 2015, also at the New-York Historical Society. He also co-organized "The First Step to Freedom," a multicity, sesquicentennial exhibition of Lincoln's original Preliminary Emancipation Proclamation, which debuted at the Schomburg Library in Harlem on September 22, 2012. He has performed the stage programs "Lincoln Seen and Heard," "The Lincoln Family Album," "Lincoln in American Memory," and "Grant Seen and Heard"—combining period pictures with authentic words—with such actors as Sam Waterston, Liam Neeson, Richard Dreyfuss, Stephen Lang, Holly Hunter, André De Shields, Anna Deavere Smith, Annette Bening, Alec Baldwin, F. Murray Abraham, and Dianne Wiest. His most recent programs are "The Real Lincoln-Douglas Debates" with Norm Lewis and Stephen Lang, performed at The Metropolitan Museum of Art and telecast on C-SPAN; and "Lincoln's Shakespeare" with Waterston, Lang, Kathleen Chalfant, Fritz Weaver, and John Douglas Thompson and performed in 2013 and 2014 at The Century Association and The Berkshire Playhouse. Holzer's programs have been staged at the White House as well as at such venues as the George H. W. Bush Presidential Library, the William J. Clinton Presidential Library, Lincoln Center in New York, The Metropolitan Museum of Art, the Library of Congress, the Lincoln Association of Los Angeles, The Lincoln Forum, Ford's Theatre, site of the Lincoln assassination, and the U.S. Capitol.

=== Awards ===
- In 2008, Holzer received the National Humanities Medal from President Bush and The Lincoln Medal of Honor from the Lincoln Society of Springfield, Illinois, the state's highest honor. He also won a second-place 2005 Lincoln Prize (for Lincoln at Cooper Union).
- For his 2008 book Lincoln President-Elect, Holzer received awards from The Lincoln Group of New York, The Civil War Round Table of New York, and The Illinois State Historical Society.
- His 2011 young readers' book, Father Abraham: Lincoln and His Sons, won the first James Robertson Jr. Award for Civil War Children's Literature from The Civil War Round Table of New York.
- He won lifetime achievement awards from The Civil War Round Tables of New York, Chicago, and Kansas City, and from Lincoln groups in Washington and New York.
- He won the DAR History Award Medal in 2012.
- In 2013, he wrote the Lincoln-Emancipation essay for the official program for the re-inauguration of President Barack Obama.
- Holzer's book Lincoln and the Power of the Press: The War for Public Opinion won not only the Lincoln Prize but also the Mark Lynton History Prize from the Columbia University School of Journalism, the Goldsmith Book Prize from The Shorenstein Center on Media, Politics, and Public Policy at Harvard's Kennedy School, and The Hazel Dicken-Garcia Award for Distinguished Scholarship in Journalism History.
- In 2015, Holzer received The Lincoln Forum's Richard Nelson Current Award of Achievement.
- In 2023, he was awarded the Augustus Saint-Gaudens Medal for his biography of Daniel Chester French, for which he also won a 2020 New England Society Book Award.
- In 2025, the Board of Trustees of the John Simon Guggenheim Memorial Foundation named Holzer a member of the Class of 2025 Guggenheim Fellows, entitling him to "a monetary stipend to pursue independent work at the highest level under 'the freest possible conditions'".

== Works ==
- 1984: The Lincoln Image: Abraham Lincoln and the Popular Print with Mark E. Neely, Jr. and Gabor S. Boritt
- 1985: Changing the Lincoln Image with Neely and Boritt
- 1987: The Confederate Image: Prints of the Lost Cause with Neely and Boritt
- 1990: Lincoln on Democracy (co-edited with Mario M. Cuomo)
- 1990: The Lincoln Family Album with Neely
- 1993: Mine Eyes Have Seen the Glory: The Civil War in Art with Neely
- 1993: The Lincoln-Douglas Debates: The First Complete, Unexpurgated Text
- 1993: Washington and Lincoln Portrayed: National Icons in Popular Prints
- 1993: Dear Mr. Lincoln: Letters to the President
- 1996: Witness to War
- 1996: The Civil War Era
- 1998: The Lincoln Mailbag: America Writes to the President
- 1999: The Union Preserved with Daniel Lorello
- 1999: The Lincoln Forum: Abraham Lincoln, Gettysburg, and the Civil War (co-edited with John Y. Simon and William Pederson)
- 1999: Lincoln as I Knew Him: Gossip, Tributes, and Revelations from His Best Friends and Worst Enemies
- 2000: The Union Image: Prints of the Civil War North with Neely
- 2000: Lincoln Seen and Heard
- 2000: Abraham Lincoln, The Writer (named to the Children's Literature Choice List, and the Bank Street "Best Children's Books of the Year")
- 2001: Prang's Civil War Pictures: The Complete Battle Chromos of Louis Prang
- 2002: State of the Union: New York and the Civil War
- 2002: The Lincoln Forum: Rediscovering Abraham Lincoln (co-edited with John Y. Simon)
- 2004: The President is Shot! The Assassination of Abraham Lincoln
- 2004: Lincoln at Cooper Union: The Speech That Made Abraham Lincoln President
- 2005: Lincoln in the Times: The Life of Abraham Lincoln as Originally Reported in the New York Times (co-edited with David Herbert Donald, St. Martin's Press)
- 2006: The Battle of Hampton Roads (co-edited with Tim Mulligan)
- 2006: The Emancipation Proclamation: Three Views (with Edna Greene Medford and Frank J. Williams)
- 2006: Lincoln Portrayed: In the Collections of the Indiana Historical Society
- 2007: Abraham Lincoln Revisited (co-edited with Simon and Dawn Vogel)
- 2007: Lincoln and Freedom: Slavery, Emancipation, and the Thirteenth Amendment (co-edited with Sarah Vaughn Gabbard)
- 2007: Lincoln's White House Secretary: The Adventurous Life of William O. Stoddard
- 2008: Lincoln President-Elect: Abraham Lincoln and the Great Secession Winter, 1860-1861
- 2009: The Lincoln Anthology: Great Writers on His Life and Legacy from 1860 to Now
- 2009: In Lincoln's Hand: His Original Manuscripts with Commentary by Distinguished Americans.
- 2009: The Lincoln Assassination Conspirators: Their Confinement and Execution, as Recorded in the Letterbook of John Frederick Hartranft (co-edited with Edward Steers, Jr.)
- 2009: Lincoln and New York
- 2010: The Lincoln Assassination: Crime & Punishment, Myth & Memory (co-edited with Craig L. Symonds and Frank J. Williams)
- 2010: The New York Times Civil War (co-edited with Craig L. Symonds with an introduction by President Bill Clinton)
- 2011: Father Abraham: Lincoln and His Sons
- 2011: Lincoln on War
- 2011: Hearts Touched by Fire: The Best of Battles and Leaders of the Civil War
- 2011: The Living Lincoln (co-edited with Thomas A. Horrocks and Frank J. Williams)
- 2012: Emancipating Lincoln: The Proclamation in Text, Context, and Memory
- 2012: Lincoln: How Abraham Lincoln Ended Slavery in America
- 2013: Abraham Lincoln, Defender of Freedom (editor)
- 2013: 1863: Lincoln's Pivotal Year (co-edited with Sara Gabbard)
- 2013: The Civil War in 50 Objects
- 2014: Lincoln and the Power of the Press: The War for Public Opinion
- 2015: President Lincoln Assassinated!!: The Firsthand Story of the Murder, Manhunt, Trial, and Mourning, Compiled and Introduced by Harold Holzer
- 2015: Exploring Lincoln: Great Historians Reappraise Our Greatest President (co-edited with Craig L. Symonds and Frank J. Williams)
- 2015: 1865: America Makes War and Peace in Lincoln's Final Year (co-edited with Sarah Vaughn Gabbard)
- 2015: A Just and Generous Nation: Abraham Lincoln and the Fight for American Opportunity (with Norton Garfinkle)
- 2016: The Annotated Lincoln (co-edited with Thomas Horrocks)
- 2019: Monument Man: The Life and Art of Daniel Chester French
- 2020: The Presidents vs. the Press: The Endless Battle between the White House and the Media—from the Founding Fathers to Fake News
- 2024: Brought Forth on This Continent: Abraham Lincoln and American Immigration

== Honors ==
- 1984, 1990, 1993, 2005, 2009, 2015: Barondess Award of the Civil War Round Table of New York
- 1988: Diploma of Honor from Lincoln Memorial University
- 1988, 1993, 2004, 2009: Award of Achievement from the Lincoln Group of New York
- 1988: George Washington Medal from the Freedom Foundation
- 1989: Writer of Distinction Award from the International Reading Association
- 1992: Honorary Doctorate in Humane Letters from Lincoln College
- 1993: Award of Superior Achievement from the Illinois State Historical Society
- 1996: Manuscript Society of America award for Dear Mr. Lincoln
- 2000: Newman Book Award of the American Historical Print Collectors Society for The Union Image
- 2002: Nevins-Freeman Award of The Civil War Round Table of Chicago
- 2006: Honorary degrees by Illinois College and University of Massachusetts Dartmouth
- 2006: The Lincoln Group of The District of Columbia's annual award of achievement
- 2008: The Bell I. Wiley Prize for Lifetime Achievement from the Civil War Round Table of New York
- 2008: The National Humanities Medal from President George W. Bush
- 2009: Honorary Degree (Doctor of Humane Letters) from Bard College
- 2009: President's Medal from Queens College, CUNY
- 2009: Inducted as a Laureate of The Lincoln Academy of Illinois and awarded the Order of Lincoln (the State's highest honor) by the Governor of Illinois in 2009 Bicentennial Laureate.
- 2010: Lincoln Medal of Honor, Lincoln Society, Springfield, Illinois
- 2010: Awards for Lincoln and New York exhibition from The Civil War Round Table of New York, The Lincoln Group of New York, and The Victorian Society.
- 2010: Barondess Award, The Civil War Round Table of New York, for Lincoln President-Elect
- 2011: James Robertson Jr. Award for Civil War Children's Literature, Civil War Round Table of New York
- 2012: DAR History Award Medal
- 2012: Honorary Degree (Doctor of Humane Letters), Centre College, Danville, KY
- 2015: Lincoln Group of New York Achievement Award
- 2015: Harry S. Truman Award from The Civil War Round Table of Kansas City
- 2015: Gilder Lehrman Lincoln Prize
- 2015: Hazel Dicken-Garcia Award for Distinguished Contributions to Journalism History
- 2015: Mark Lynton History Prize, Columbia University School of Journalism
- 2015: Goldsmith Prize from The Shorenstein Center on Media, Politics, and Public Policy, Kennedy School at Harvard University
- 2015: Boyd County High School chapter of the Rho Kappa National Social Studies Honor Society named Harold Holzer Scholar Award in Holzer's honor.
- 2020. New England Society Book Award
- 2021: The Lincoln Forum created an annual book prize in Holzer's honor.
- 2023: The Augustus Saint-Gaudens Medal
- 2025: Guggenheim Fellow
