= Julie Cellini =

American journalist

Julie Cellini is an American free-lance journalist in Illinois with a writing career spanning over 50 years. She is a former newspaper reporter who has been active in historical and cultural preservation in Central Illinois for over 30 years. In the 1960s, while covering the political news beat, she met and later married Willam F. Cellini, a Springfield, Illinois city council member.

Ms. Cellini serves as a trustee for the Abraham Lincoln Presidential Library and Museum Foundation and serves on the board of the Hope Institute for Children and Families (a private, not-for-profit home, school and treatment center serving children with multiple disabilities and their families). She also serves on the board of the Memorial Medical Center Foundation and the Abraham Lincoln Bicentennial Commission Task Force. She was one of three people who received honorary doctorates at the Illinois College 172nd commencement in 2006.

As a founding member of the Illinois Historic Preservation Agency, Cellini has been cited as the driving force behind the establishment of the Abraham Lincoln Presidential Library and Museum, a $150 million project that has drawn over two million visitors since its opening, she was awarded the State Journal-Register First Citizen in 2015 for her efforts in the development of the Abraham Lincoln Presidential Museum and Library.

Through her interests in Illinois' history and in the life and presidency of Abraham Lincoln, Illinois Governor James R. Thompson appointed her a trustee to the Illinois State Historical Library in 1981. The library serves as the governance arm of the extensive Lincoln artifact and documents collection. In 1985, Ms. Cellini became chairman of that board as well as for the Library's successor organization, the Illinois State Historical Preservation Agency. Her committee developed a plan to improve public access to the Lincoln collection and its efforts resulted in the opening of the Abraham Lincoln Presidential Library and Museum (ALPLM) in April 2005.

== Awards ==
Julie Cellini was inducted as a Laureate of The Lincoln Academy of Illinois and awarded the Order of Lincoln (the State’s highest honor) by the Governor of Illinois in 2009 as a Bicentennial Laureate.
