= Abraham Lincoln Bicentennial Commission =

U.S. congressional commission, 2000–2010

- Abbreviation: ALBC
- Successor: Abraham Lincoln Bicentennial Foundation
- Formation: 2000
- Type: State-Federal partnership
- ALBC Co-Chair: Richard J. Durbin
- ALBC Co-chair: Harold Holzer

The Abraham Lincoln Bicentennial Commission (ALBC) was the congressionally created, 14-member federal commission focused on planning and commemorating the 200th birthday of the United States' 16th president on February 12, 2009. The commission served for ten years, from 2000 to 2010. Its official successor organization, announced in 2011 with an expanded board and broadened mission, is the Abraham Lincoln Bicentennial Foundation.

== Commissioners ==
The ALBC was established by the passage of the Abraham Lincoln Bicentennial Commission Act in 2000 (Public Law No: 106-173). The commission's 14 members were a diverse group of political leaders, jurists, scholars and collectors, chosen for their knowledge of Lincoln and their experience educating the public on his life, times, and historical impact. The commissioners were appointed by the president, the United States House of Representatives and the United States Senate, with input from the governors of Illinois, Indiana, and Kentucky. Commissioners included:

- Richard J. Durbin, United States senator from Illinois, ALBC co-chair
- Harold Holzer, ALBC co-chair and senior vice president for external affairs at the Metropolitan Museum of Art.
- Dr. Jean Bandler
- Dr. Darrel E. Bigham, professor of history at the University of Southern Indiana
- Dr. Gabor Boritt, Robert Fluhrer professor of civil war studies and director of the Civil War Institute at Gettysburg College
- Jim Bunning, United States senator from Kentucky
- Julie Cellini
- James O. Horton, Joan L. Banneker Professor of American Studies and History at George Washington University and Historian Emeritus of the National Museum of American History
- Rep. Jesse L. Jackson Jr. (D - IL)
- Lura Lynn Ryan, former first lady of Illinois
- Louise Taper, owner of the Taper Collection, the most significant private collection of Lincoln artifacts (acquired in 2007 by the Abraham Lincoln Presidential Library and Museum)
- Judge Tommy Turner, founded Lincoln Museum in Hodgenville, Kentucky
- Frank J. Williams, former Chief Justice (Ret.) of the Rhode Island Supreme Court and Lincoln scholar
- Ray LaHood, former U.S. congressman from Illinois's 18th congressional district served as ALBC Co-chair until January 2009 when he was subsequently appointed and assumed office as United States Secretary of Transportation in President Barack Obama's administration.

Eileen R. Mackevich served as executive director from 2006 to 2010. Her predecessor was Michael Bishop.

Other staff included:

- Jennifer Rosenfeld, deputy executive director
- David Early, director of communications
- Courtney Barefoot
- V. Suresh
- Hasan Aloul, webmaster
- Bryan Jack
- Sharon Cunningham, accountant
- David Morgan
- Genevieve Courbois

ALBC offices are located in the John Adams Building of the Library of Congress in Washington, D.C.

== Overview ==
Established by the United States Congress, the ALBC aims to celebrate the life and legacy of Lincoln while reinvigorating his thoughts, ideals and spirit throughout America and around the world. The commission's goals highlight numerous projects and cultural events including nine signature events:

- The National Opening Ceremony - Louisville, Kentucky and Hodgenville, Kentucky.
- The Mother's Day Celebration - Lincoln City, Indiana.
- Birthday Tribute and Wreath-Laying Ceremony in Washington, D.C.
- The Lincoln Memorial Rededication Series - Washington, D.C.
- Bicameral Celebration of Abraham Lincoln's Birthday: A Congressional Tribute - United States Capitol rotunda.
- Exhibition - "With Malice Toward None: The Abraham Lincoln Bicentennial Exhibit" - Washington, D.C.
- National Teach-In - National Archives, Washington, D.C.
- Howard University Conference: Emancipation and Race in the Age of Lincoln - April 16–18, 2009.
- The Global Lincoln: A Conference Examining the Global Legacy of Abraham Lincoln - St Catherine's College, Oxford - July 3–5, 2009.

Other ALBC tributes included:

- New coin redesign series featuring four new cents.
- A new five-dollar bill.
- 2009 Bicentennial commemorative dollar coin.
- Four United States Postal Service commemorative Lincoln stamps.
- Ten town hall meetings around the United States.
- A Dedication Day Ceremony in Gettysburg, Pennsylvania, site of the Battle of Gettysburg and Lincoln's Gettysburg Address
- "Rise Up and Hear: An Evening of Poetry Honoring Abraham Lincoln's Legacy" - Washington, D.C., September 22, 2008.

Additional Lincoln Bicentennial events included:

- A week-long Lincoln Bicentennial Bike Tour, Tour de Lincoln, from August 16–23, 2008 which begins at Lincoln's birthplace in Hodgenville, Kentucky and concludes in Springfield, Illinois.
- An international symposium in Paris, France.
- Forever Free: Abraham Lincoln's Journey to Emancipation traveling exhibit.

== Outreach ==
The ALBC collaborated with numerous scholars and public figures as well as cultural and educational institutions to help educate and engage the public. An advisory board included more than 150 historians, scholars, civic leaders and Lincoln enthusiasts. Among them were Michael Beschloss, David Blight, Ken Burns, Richard Carwardine, David Herbert Donald, John Hope Franklin, Doris Kearns Goodwin, Dr. Allen C. Guelzo, James M. McPherson, Douglas Wilson, Orville Vernon Burton, Mario M. Cuomo, Dr. Roger Wilkins, Jack Kemp, and Sam Waterston.

In conjunction with the Library of Congress, the ALBC created an interactive exhibit titled "With Malice Toward None." The 2009–2010 traveling exhibit highlighted Lincoln's life and featured original speeches, letters, photos and artifacts.

Various organizations supported Lincoln's Bicentennial, including the New-York Historical Society; Huntington Library in San Marino, California; National Archives; Chicago Historical Society; Newberry Library in Chicago; Organization of American Historians; Abraham Lincoln Presidential Library and Museum in Springfield, Illinois; Lincoln Museum in Fort Wayne, Indiana; Gilder Lehrman Institute of American History; Military Order of the Loyal Legion of the United States (MOLLUS); Fetzer Institute in Kalamazoo, Michigan; National Park Service; and C-SPAN.

== Kentucky Inaugural Celebration ==
On February 11–12, 2008, the ALBC launched its two-year celebration of Lincoln's 200th birthday. The two-day event began in Louisville at the historic Henry Clay Hotel. Pulitzer Prize winning author Doris Kearns Goodwin, McConnell Center senior fellow Dr. Thomas Mackey and African-American historian Dr. Gerald L. Smith addressed the crowd during the Lincoln on Leadership Symposium.

That evening, The Kentucky Center for the Performing Arts hosted A Kentucky Salute to Abraham Lincoln. Popular radio journalist and Louisville native, Bob Edwards served as master of ceremonies. Performances included the Louisville Orchestra and opera soprano Angela Brown. Film producer Jerry Bruckheimer and his wife Linda Bruckheimer, a Kentucky native, welcomed the audience. American composer Peter Schickele premiered his new piece, Lincoln at Ease.

Capping the evening was award-winning actor Sam Waterston and Lincoln scholar Harold Holzer with their critically acclaimed production Lincoln Seen and Heard, a narrated and dramatic presentation of Lincoln's life.

A snow storm hit that evening and the next morning, on Lincoln's 199th birthday, icy roads forced the cancellation of the formal inaugural ceremony at the Abraham Lincoln Birthplace National Historic Site in Hodgenville, Kentucky.

First Lady Laura Bush was scheduled to deliver the keynote address. Other speakers included United States Secretary of the Interior Dirk Kempthorne, ALBC Commissioners Tommy Turner and Harold Holzer, U.S. Congressman Ron Lewis (R-KY) and Kentucky Governor Steve Beshear. Award-winning actor Sam Waterston was set to narrate the Gettysburg Address. Period music by the famed brass band Saxton's Cornet Band and the American Spiritual Ensemble was also planned.

== Lincoln Mother's Day Celebration ==
On May 11, 2008, the ALBC celebrated its second national signature event in Lincoln City, Indiana. Paying tribute to the women in Lincoln's life, the Lincoln Mother's Day Celebration also served as the statewide Lincoln Bicentennial kick-off for the Indiana ALBC. However, blustering wind and rainy conditions nearly cancelled the tribute. Scheduled for the Lincoln Boyhood National Memorial, the commemoration survived after National Park Service relocated the event to the Lincoln State Park.

ALBC Commissioners Joan Flinspach and Dr. Darrel Bigham addressed the audience along with Indiana Governor Mitch Daniels and Congressman Baron Hill.

== Rise Up and Hear: An Evening of Poetry Honoring Abraham Lincoln's Legacy ==
In collaboration with the National Endowment for the Arts and the Poetry Foundation, the ALBC showcased an evening of poetry and music enjoyed by Lincoln as well as works inspired by his leadership. Featuring a variety of well-known poets and actors, the program included readings of contemporary and classic poems.

Special guests included actors Joan Allen and Sam Waterston. Dana Gioia, poet and Chairman of the National Endowment for the Arts led the evening festivities. Other attendees included former Secretary of Interior Dirk Kempthorne; ALBC Co-chair Harold Holzer; Poet and President of the Poetry Foundation John Barr; Former U.S. Poet Laureate Robert Pinsky; and 2008 Poetry Out Loud National Champion Shawntay Henry. The band Dead Man's Hollow performed Lincoln-era music.

The September 22, 2008, event took place at the Sidney Yates Auditorium in the United States Department of Interior.

== National Teach-In ==
The Abraham Lincoln Bicentennial Commission, in partnership with the History Channel, featured a National Teach-In on the life and legacy of Abraham Lincoln broadcast live from the National Archives in Washington, D.C.

The special live event featured Lincoln scholars, Doris Kearns Goodwin, Matthew Pinsker and Harold Holzer, sharing their expertise and answering students' questions.

Over 5,000 schools from the US and countless more from nine different countries participated. The webcast sparked hundreds of people to submit questions.

== Lincoln Memorial Rededication Series ==
A three-part event, the Lincoln Memorial Rededication Series featured appearances by some of America's most notable figures, including Members of Congress, Michael Feinstein, Colin Powell and the U.S. Marine Corps Band.

=== February 12, 2009 ===
Birthday Tribute and Wreath-Laying Ceremony - 8:00 am:
Four-time Grammy-nominated singer Michael Feinstein sang the National Anthem, accompanied by the U.S. Marine Corps Band. Acclaimed poet and author Nikki Giovanni recited her new work, "At this Moment", written especially for the Bicentennial. And ALBC Co-Chairs Senator Dick Durbin and Harold Holzer addressed the crowd.

Other attendees and speakers included Secretary of Transportation Ray LaHood, Secretary of Interior Ken Salazar; MOLLUS 57th Commander-in-Chief Karl Schaeffer and Gordon R. Bury, 54th MOLLUS Commander-in-Chief; and retired Rhode Island Supreme Court Chief Justice – and ALBC Commissioner – Frank J. Williams who read the Gettysburg Address with school children from Strong John Thomson Elementary School in Washington, DC.

U.S. Court of Appeals for the Armed Forces Judge Scott Stucky was Master of Ceremonies.

Wreaths were presented on behalf of the people of the United States, the diplomatic corps, and various hereditary organizations, including the Military Order of the Loyal Legion of the United States in a stirring ceremony.

Photos from that morning and a video of Michael Feinstein's performance can be found at the Lincoln Bicentennial's website.

Bicameral Celebration of Abraham Lincoln's Birthday: A Congressional Tribute - 11:30 AM:
President Barack Obama paid tribute to the former legislator from Illinois in the United States Capitol rotunda and US Army Chorus resoundingly performed "Battle Hymn of the Republic" as House and Senate leaders convened to commemorate Lincoln's 200th birthday.

Senators Dick Durbin, Jim Bunning, Mitch McConnell and Harry Reid addressed the assembly and Illinois Congressmen Jesse Jackson Jr and Donald Manzullo recited the Gettysburg Address. Other speakers included Rep. John Boehner; House Speaker Nancy Pelosi; ALBC Co-chair Harold Holzer; Dr. Richard Norton Smith, former executive director of the Abraham Lincoln Presidential Library; and Doris Kearns Goodwin, author and presidential historian.

Goodwin spoke about Lincoln's presidential leadership, and Dr. Smith addressed Lincoln's early years as a state legislator and Member of Congress. C-SPAN provided full coverage of the Bicameral Tribute.

Below is the list of speakers (in order):

- President Barack Obama
- Sen. Richard Durbin
- Sen. Jim Bunning
- Harold Holzer
- Congressmen Jesse Jackson and Donald Manzullo, both recited portions of Gettysburg Address, respectively.
- Richard Norton Smith
- Doris Kearns Goodwin
- Rep. John Boehner
- Sen. Mitch McConnell
- Sen. Harry Reid
- House Speaker Nancy Pelosi

=== April 12, 2009 ===
The second part of the Lincoln Memorial Rededication Series, the ALBC and NPS combined efforts to produce the Marian Anderson Tribute and Naturalization Ceremony.

On Easter Sunday 1939, contralto Marian Anderson famously performed on the steps of the Lincoln Memorial after the Daughters of the American Revolution barred her from singing at Constitution Hall due to the color of her skin.

Marian Anderson, who was born in 1897, was described as having "a voice heard once in a hundred years." Yet in 1939, she was denied the right to perform in Washington, DC's Constitution Hall due to the color of her skin. Through the efforts of Anderson, the NAACP, First Lady Eleanor Roosevelt, and Interior Secretary Harold Ickes, arrangements were made to hold the concert on the steps of the Lincoln Memorial.

On April 12, 2009, seventy years after Anderson set the stage for the modern civil rights era, acclaimed mezzo-soprano Denyce Graves performed at the Lincoln Memorial in a joyous Easter Sunday Concert paying tribute to Marian Anderson's performance.

Graves was joined by the internationally renowned a capella ensemble Sweet Honey in the Rock and the world-famous Chicago Children's Choir. Founded in 1956 at the First Unitarian Church in Chicago, by the late Rev. Christopher Moore.

Sponsored by the McCormick Foundation and others, the tribute also featured a naturalization ceremony of 191 new American citizens representing 56 countries. Gen. Colin Powell, the son of two Jamaican immigrants, delivered the keynote address.

The picturesque day concluded with the U.S. Marine Band performing John Philip Sousa's "The Stars and Stripes Forever."

=== May 30, 2009 ===
On May 30, 1922, President Warren G. Harding commemorated the life of President Lincoln with the dedication of the Lincoln Memorial. Exactly four score and seven years later the ALBC, National Park Service, Military Order of the Loyal Legion of the United States and the Military District of Washington, presented a Rededication Retrospective.

The program, at the Lincoln Memorial, featured special guest speakers that delivered remarks about how Abraham Lincoln and the Lincoln Memorial remained entwined as beacons of freedom. The program also featured performances by the United States Marine Band and by William Farley, winner of Poetry Out Loud, who read Poet and well-known Abraham Lincoln biographer Carl Sandburg's The People, Yes.

Speakers and performers included:

- Gordon R. Bury, 100th Commander-in-Chief of the Sons of Union Veterans of the Civil War
- William Farley, 2009 Poetry Out Loud National Champion
- Reverend Dr. Roger J. Gench, Senior pastor at New York Avenue Presbyterian Church in Washington, D.C.
- Harold Holzer, ALBC Commissioner
- Peggy O'Dell, Regional Director for the National Capitol
- Dr. Benjamin Franklin Payton, President of Tuskegee University
- Ernest "Ernie" Quintana, Acting Deputy Director of the National Park Service
- Secretary Ken Salazar, Department of the Interior
- United States Marine Band

== National Town Hall Meetings ==
On July 22, 2008, over 30 leaders from the fields of government, non-profit, civics, journalism, arts, humanities and education, met with the ALBC to discuss a series of National Town Halls.

Hosted by the Woodrow Wilson International Center for Scholars in Washington, D.C., meeting attendants included U.S. Rep. Jesse Jackson Jr. (D-IL), chairman of the ALBC's town hall initiative; current Secretary of Transportation Ray LaHood, then ALBC co-chair; former HUD Secretary Jack Kemp; William H. Gray III, former congressman and president of the United Negro College Fund; and Jim O'Shea, former managing editor of the Los Angeles Times. University of Chicago historians Charles Branham and Adam Green moderated the discussion.

The result: Ten cities (and later an 11th) chosen to lead discussions on Race, Freedom and Equality of Opportunity and focus on connecting Lincoln to the present day. To date, Gettysburg; Washington, DC; Detroit; Chicago; and the USS Abraham Lincoln (CVN-72) in Everett, WA have featured Town Halls. Discussion topics have included political representation, liberty and justice, immigration, voting rights, interracial roots, leadership and the military, and reconstruction.

The ALBC national Town Halls are a joint collaboration with the Fetzer Institute of Kalamazoo, Michigan and a multiplicity of co-conveners.

Visit the ALBC for more details and information on the National Town Hall Series.

=== Gettysburg, Pennsylvania ===
Gettysburg College hosted the first national Town Hall on November 20, 2008. Panelists included Congressman Jesse Jackson Jr., Secretary Jack Kemp, Allen Guelzo, Susan Eisenhower and executive director of the Pennsylvania Governor's Advisory Commission on Latino Affairs Norman Bristol Colon. Charles R. Branham, senior historian at the DuSable Museum of African American History in Chicago moderated the discussion.

Over 300 people filled Union Ballroom as the panelists highlighted President Lincoln's role and impact during the American Civil War. Topics of discussion included race relations, equality of opportunity, the 2008 presidential election and cultural progression in America.

=== USS Abraham Lincoln (CVN-72) - Everett, Washington ===
Focusing on "Lincoln, Leadership, and the Military," the February 27, 2009, meeting on board the nuclear-powered aircraft carrier, USS Abraham Lincoln was the second of 11 town halls.

The program, produced in cooperation with the aircraft carrier's commanders and the Stennis Center for Public Service Leadership, included:

- Matthew Pinsker, history professor at Dickinson College and author of Lincoln's Sanctuary: Abraham Lincoln and the Soldier's Home.
- Robin Read, president of the National Foundation for Women Legislators
- Joseph P. Reidy, Howard University history professor renowned for his scholarly work on African American sailors in the Civil War Navy
- Donald Scott, retired U.S. Army general, expert on military leadership.

In addition to the give-and-take of the town hall, the Lincoln's crew heard the world-premiere of "Letters From Lincoln," a newly commissioned jazz work by Anthony Davis, composer of operas X, The Life and Times of Malcolm X; Under the Double Moon; and Amistad.

A congressional delegation, led by U.S. Reps. Norm Dicks (D-Wash.) and Rick Larsen (D-Wash.), also visited the carrier and participated in the town hall meeting.

Adam Green, associate professor of history at the University of Chicago whose work has focused on African American and U.S. history and comparative racial politics, moderated.

=== Washington, D.C. ===
Hosted by the Historical Society of Washington, DC, the ALBC's third national Town Hall focused on Race, Freedom, & Equality of Opportunity: The Right to Vote.

The distinguished panel explored the history of voting and voting rights in the U.S.; the struggle for voting rights waged by various groups of Americans; the cultural importance of casting a ballot as civic participation and empowerment; and how the District's voting limbo is part of that history.

Panelists included:

- Wade Henderson, Leadership Conference on Civil Rights
- Donita Judge, Attorney, Advancement Project
- Alexander Keyssar, Social Policy Professor, Harvard and author of The Right to Vote and other books.
- Jonathan Turley, constitutional law scholar, George Washington University Law School
- Kenneth Thomas, Legislative Attorney, Congressional Research Service
- Armstrong Williams, Syndicated Radio Host and columnist
- Ron Walters, scholar of African American politics, University of Maryland, College Park, and author, "Freedom Is Not Enough"

The March 19, 2009, town hall also featured live musical performances from DC artists Rasi Caprice, Joe L Da Vessel and Melodic, and Chinwe Enu.

Askia Mohammad, news director of WPFW-FM Radio 89.3 and National Newspapers Publishers Association (NNPA) Syndicated Columnist, moderated the discussion.

=== Detroit, Michigan ===
In the fourth National Town Hall, the ALBC partnered with The Henry Ford Museum. The April 20, 2009, town hall discussed issues pertaining to Race, Freedom & Equality of Opportunity.

Participants included:

- Douglas Brinkley, American author and distinguished Professor of History, Rice University
- Darlene Clark Hine, Professor of African American Studies and History, Northwestern University
- Dr. Arthur L. Johnson, educator, community leader and former Executive Secretary of NAACP-Detroit Branch
- Dr. John Stauffer, Professor of English and African American Studies, Harvard University and author, Giants: The Parallel Lives of Frederick Douglass and Abraham Lincoln.
- U.S. Rep. Maxine Waters (D-CA)
- U.S. Ambassador Andrew Young

=== Chicago, Illinois ===
How do the stories we tell shape history, and how does history shape the stories we tell? This question highlighted the themes at the ALBC's fifth town hall. The June 29, 2009, program featured a conversation between Harvard professor Henry Louis Gates Jr. and Chicago newspaperman Rick Kogan. The event was held at the Chicago Public Library.

== Endorsed events ==
The ALBC endorsed 224 events and programs representing 37 states and two foreign nations.

=== ALBC exhibits ===
The Library of Congress opened "With Malice Toward None: The Abraham Lincoln Bicentennial Exhibition" on February 12, 2009. Charting Lincoln's growth from prairie lawyer to preeminent statesman, the exhibit addresses the monumental issues Lincoln faced including slavery and race, dissolution of the Union and the American Civil War. The traveling exhibition features numerous photographs, letters, speeches, and campaign artifacts rarely seen by the public. Dates for "With Malice Toward None: The Abraham Lincoln Bicentennial Exhibit" can be found below:

February 12 – May 9, 2009: Library of Congress, Washington, DC

June 22 – August 22, 2009: The California Museum, Sacramento, CA

October 10 – December 19, 2009: Newberry Library, Chicago, IL

February 22 – April 22, 2010: Indiana State Museum, Indianapolis, IN

September 4 – November 6, 2010: Atlanta History Center, Atlanta, GA

January 8, 2011 – March 5, 2011: Durham Western Heritage Museum, Omaha, NE

=== Related events ===
New-York Historical Society exhibited a selection of handwritten public documents and letters in "Lincoln in His Own Words: An Intimate Portrait Of Our Greatest President" through July 12, 2009. From 2009 to 2010, The New-York Historical Society mounted "Lincoln and New York," an exhibition curated by Lincoln Bicentennial Commission co-chair Harold Holzer.

== The Global Lincoln ==
Oxford University was the site of a global conference discussing Lincoln's international significance and appeal. Scholars from around the world gathered at St. Catherine's College on July 3–5, 2009. The conference, titled Global Lincoln: An International Conference, focused on four subjects:

- Lincoln, the United States and the World
- Lincoln the Emancipator and Liberator
- Lincoln the Nationalist Unifier and Modernizer
- Lincoln the Progressive and Democrat

Professor Richard Carwardine moderated the conference.

=== Lincoln, the United States and the World ===
Contributions by Professor Carwardine, Dr. Jay Sexton of Oxford, Odd Arne Westad of London School of Economics and Lincoln scholar Harold Holzer explored Lincoln's understanding of the globe and US role in foreign affairs.

Dr. Sexton considered the ways in which American educators and statesmen attempted to project an image of the Lincoln across the globe, particularly during the Cold War and when formulating and articulating American foreign policy. Dr. Westad expanded on the Cold War and explored the ways in which peoples and states conceived of Lincoln and used his image for their own purposes. Finally, ALBC Commissioner Harold Holzer examined prints and statues of Lincoln's image across the world.

=== Lincoln the Emancipator and Liberator ===
Part two of the conference focused on Lincoln's international view as an emancipator and liberator. Professor Norman Saul of Kansas State delivered a Russian perspective of Lincoln and the president's image in the context of Russia's revolutionary changes during the birth of the soviet era. The discussion continued with a Latin America perspective from Professor Nicola Miller of the University College of London. Professor Miller examined how Lincoln served as a powerful symbol in Brazil and Cuba during those country's emancipation.

Finally, historian David Blight of Yale University revisited the perceptions of southerners during Lincoln's era. Initially, many feared him as the embodiment of 'Black Republicanism' but after the war these same southerners came to recognize him as the charitable alternative to the regime of radical Republicans during Reconstruction.

=== Lincoln the Nationalist Unifier and Modernizer ===
Part three focused on the time period between 1865 and 1945. Professor Eugenio Biagini of the University of Cambridge examined the perceptions of Lincoln in Germany and Italy as they underwent parallel processes of unification and economic growth. Other discussion topics included Lincoln's influence in East Asia, India, South Africa and during the Spanish Civil War with the "Lincoln Brigades."

=== Lincoln the Progressive and Democrat ===
Plans to explore Lincoln's legacy and reputation throughout Great Britain and Ireland. Adam I.P. Smith, University College London, discussed Lincoln's legacy as it relates to Scotland and England.

A Wales perspective came from Kenneth O. Morgan of University of Oxford. Professor Morgan addressed Lincoln's reputation and influence in Wales during the later 19th and early 20th centuries.

Professor Kevin Kenny of Boston College discussed Lincoln's relationship with Ireland. Professor Kenny broadened the discussion to include the Irish in America. The main focus was Lincoln's image in debates regarding Irish nationalism and Ireland's place in the Union.

== See also ==
- Abraham Lincoln
- Abraham Lincoln assassination
- Lincoln's Birthday
