= ALBC =

ALBC may refer to:

- Abraham Lincoln Bicentennial Commission
- American Livestock Breeds Conservancy
