= Civil war institute =

Civil War Institute may refer to:

- Civil War Institute at Gettysburg College
- Civil War Institute at Manor College
- Bridgewater College Civil War Institute
