= Frank J. Williams =

American judge

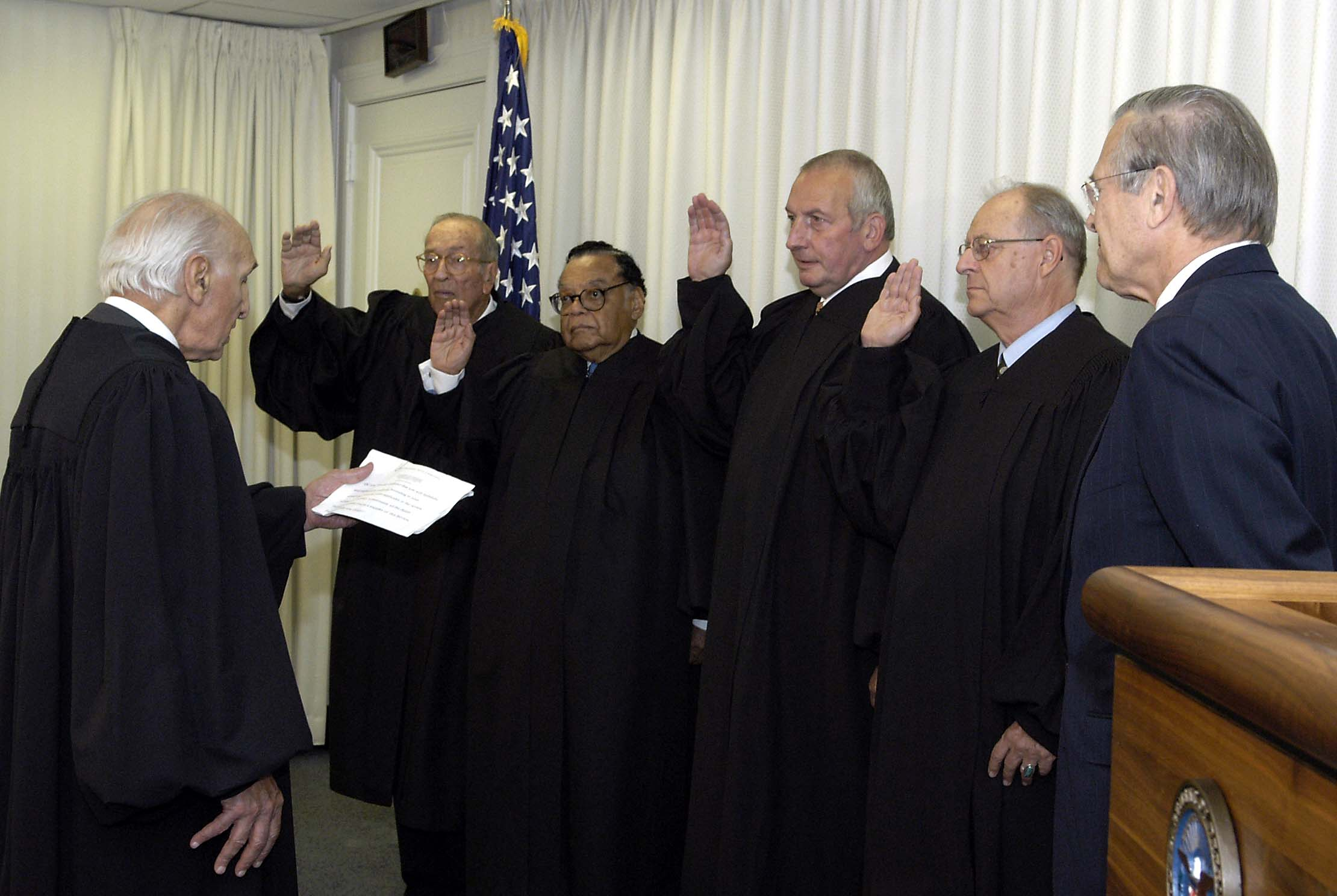
- Williams (second from the right in the line facing the camera) shown with other judges on the Court of Military Commission Review

39th Chief Justice of the Rhode Island Supreme Court
- In office 2001–2008
- Appointed by: Lincoln Almond
- Preceded by: Joseph R. Weisberger
- Succeeded by: Paul Suttell

Personal details
- Born: August 24, 1940 (age 85) Richmond, Rhode Island
- Education: Boston University; Boston University School of Law; Bryant University
- Civilian awards: Laureate of The Lincoln Academy of Illinois; The Order of Lincoln

Military service
- Allegiance: United States of America
- Branch/service: United States Army
- Rank: Captain
- Military awards: Combat Infantryman Badge; Bronze Star Medal; Three Air Medals; Army Commendation Medal; National Defense Service Medal; Vietnam Service Medal; Republic of Vietnam Cross of Gallantry; Republic of Vietnam Campaign Medal

Frank J. Williams (born August 24, 1940) is a former Chief Justice of the Supreme Court of Rhode Island, a notable Abraham Lincoln scholar and author, and a justice of the Military Commission Review Panel.

== Biography ==
Frank Williams was born in Richmond, Rhode Island, in 1940, "the grandson of Italian immigrant parents." He graduated from Cranston East High School, Boston University and Boston University School of Law, and he received a master's degree in taxation from Bryant University.

From 1962 to 1967, he served as a captain in the U.S. Army and was stationed in West Germany and South Vietnam. His military awards include the Combat Infantryman Badge and Bronze Star Medal, three Air Medals and the Army Commendation Medal, the National Defense Service Medal, Vietnam Service Medal with two campaign stars the Republic of Vietnam Cross of Gallantry with silver citation star and Republic of Vietnam Campaign Medal for his military service.

Williams served as a delegate to the 1986 Rhode Island Constitutional Convention.

He served as town moderator of Richmond, Rhode Island, and town solicitor. Governor Lincoln Almond appointed Williams to the Supreme Court in 1995. He was elevated to Chief Justice of the Supreme Court in 2001.

=== Beach access ruling ===
Williams ruled in a 1997 case involving public access to the Narragansett Town Beach. It had long been accepted that the Rhode Island Constitution guarantees free access to all state shorelines by means of walking along the shoreline below the high tide line (a right called "lateral access"). Activists at the Narragansett Town beach argued that this right also includes unobstructed access from the land (called "perpendicular access").

Williams sided with the Town of Narragansett, ruling in court that Rhode Island Constitution "provides absolutely no indication that a right of perpendicular access across the property of others exists," and therefore the town was within its rights to charge an access fee. As of 2021, Narragansett Town Beach remains the only public beach in the state that charges for beach access.

=== Court of Military Commission Review ===
In 2003, President Bush appointed Williams through the Secretary of Defense to be a member of the United States Court of Military Commission Review. As of July 2007, he replaced Griffin Bell as the Chief Judge. He served as Chief Judge of the US Court of Military Commissions until December 2009.

=== Lincoln scholarship ===
External media

Audio
- Interview with Williams on Lincoln's spiritual and religious aspects, April 21, 2105, "Reasonably Catholic", WESU

Video
- Presentation by Williams and Harold Holzer on their essay "Lincoln's Deathbed in Art and Memory", November 18, 2000, C-SPAN
- Booknotes interview with Williams on Judging Lincoln, November 10, 2002, C-SPAN
- Presentation by Williams on The Mary Lincoln Enigma, April 25, 2013, C-SPAN

Williams has been involved with numerous aspects of Abraham Lincoln scholarship and collection for much of his life, beginning in his own boyhood. He recalled "I used to spend my 25 cents for lunch money on used Lincoln books", including Lincoln the Unknown by Andrew Carnegie and the multi-volume Abraham Lincoln: The Prairie Years and The War Years by Carl Sandburg. This eventually grew into a collection of thousands of books, documents, pieces of artwork, and other items that he kept in his home library.

Williams was president of the Abraham Lincoln Association, the Lincoln Group of Boston, and the Ulysses S. Grant Association, and was a member of the Abraham Lincoln Bicentennial Commission. After disputes within the Abraham Lincoln Association prompted Williams, Harold Holzer, and others to leave the group in the mid-1990s, Williams and Holzer co-founded The Lincoln Forum, and Williams served for 23 years as its chairman; he is now that organization's chairman emeritus. In 2005, Williams received The Lincoln Forum's Richard Nelson Current Award of Achievement.

In 2010, Williams was elected to the board of the Abraham Lincoln Bicentennial Foundation. He is an Associate Companion of the Military Order of the Loyal Legion of the United States, an organization founded by Union officers who served during the American Civil War. Williams was inducted as a Laureate of The Lincoln Academy of Illinois and awarded the Order of Lincoln (the State's highest honor) by the Governor of Illinois in 2009 as a Bicentennial Laureate.

In 2017, he and his wife Virginia donated their collection of Lincoln- and Civil War-related books and other materials to Mississippi State University. The collection, now known as The Frank and Virginia Williams Collection of Lincolniana, is subdivided into two collections: The Lincoln Book and Pamphlet Collection, and the Civil War/Collateral Book and Pamphlet Collection. Earlier, while president of the Ulysses S. Grant Association, Williams had been involved in efforts to move Grant's papers to Mississippi State from Southern Illinois University.

While on the Rhode Island Supreme Court, Williams estimated that he had used in his rulings 100 quotes attributed to Lincoln.

Williams is the author of Judging Lincoln and Lincoln as Hero. He is the co-editor of the following essay collections: Abraham Lincoln, Esq.: The Legal Career of America's Greatest President; The Mary Lincoln Enigma: Historians on America's Most Controversial First Lady; Exploring Lincoln: Great Historians Reappraise Our Greatest President; The Living Lincoln; The Lincoln Assassination Riddle: Revisiting the Crime of the Nineteenth Century; and The Lincoln Assassination: Crime and Punishment, Myth and Memory.

=== Later career ===
Frank J. Williams stepped down from the Rhode Island Supreme Court at the end of December 2009 and has lectured at several universities and institutes, most notably at the New Hampshire Institute of Politics at Saint Anselm College. Williams is also an accomplished amateur chef, and appeared as a guest on the cooking show, Ciao Italia, with Mary Ann Esposito.
