= Lincoln and the Power of the Press =

2014 book by Harold Holzer

Lincoln and the Power of the Press: The War for Public Opinion
- Author: Harold Holzer
- Subject: Abraham Lincoln
- Genre: History
- Publisher: Simon & Schuster
- Publication date: 2014
- Pages: xxix, 733 pages
- Awards: Lincoln Prize
- ISBN: 9781439192719
- OCLC: 881875908
- LC Class: E457.2 .H755 2014

Lincoln and the Power of the Press: The War for Public Opinion is a book by Harold Holzer, which was published by Simon & Schuster in 2014.

== Awards ==
It received the Lincoln Prize in 2015.
