= Edna Greene Medford =

American historian

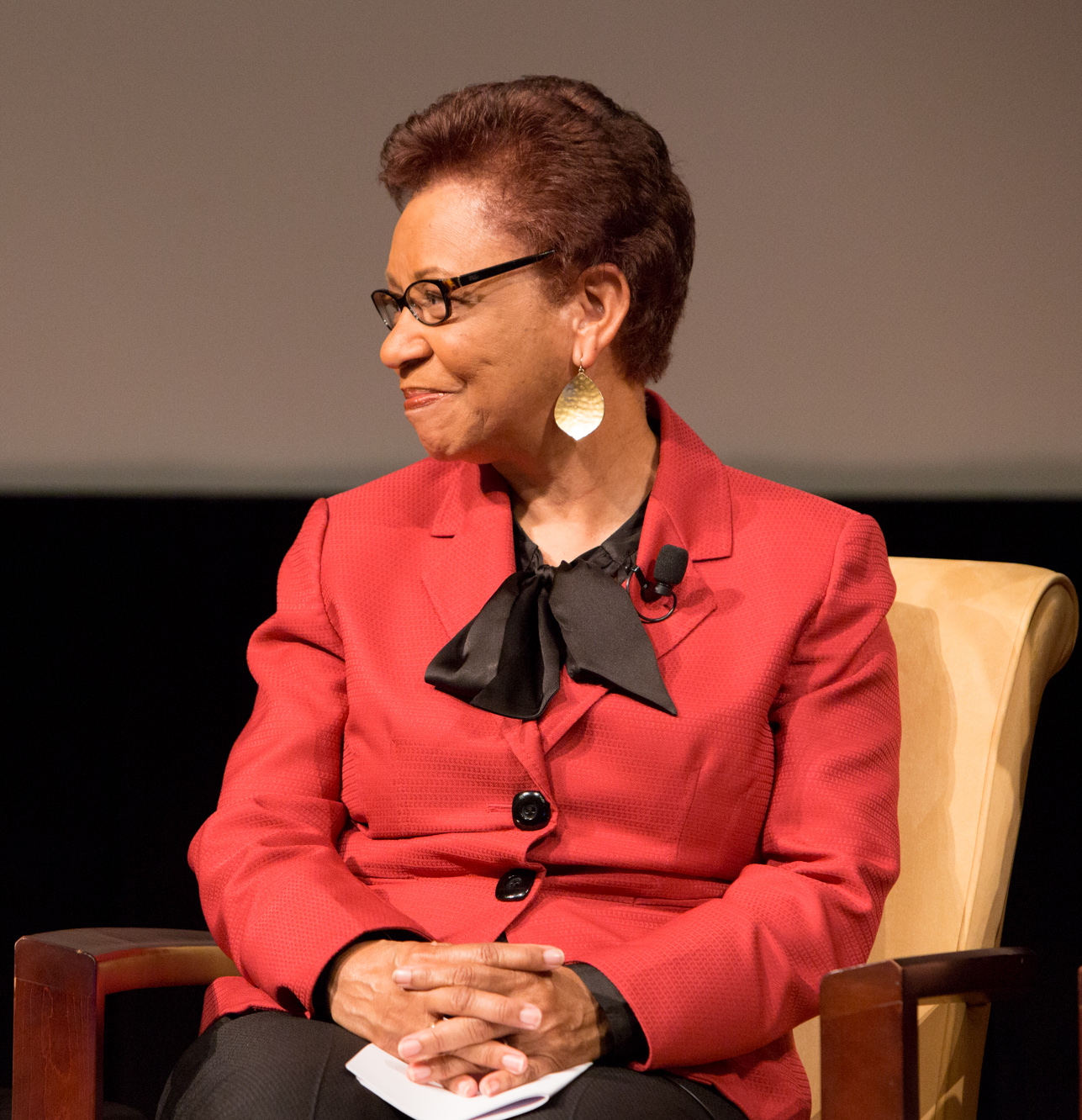
- Medford discusses First Ladies at the U.S. National Archives in 2015
- Occupation: Historian
- Employer: Howard University

Edna Greene Medford is a professor of history at Howard University who specializes in 19th-century African-American history.

She is a member of the board of the Abraham Lincoln Bicentennial Foundation and is on the Executive Committee of The Lincoln Forum.

Medford has degrees from Hampton University and the University of Illinois. She holds a PhD in History from the University of Maryland. Edna Greene Medford served as Chair of the Department of History of Howard University for nearly eight years. In July 2018, she became the Interim Dean of the College of Arts and Sciences of Howard University. She is the author of Lincoln and Emancipation (2015) and co-author of The Emancipation Proclamation: Three Views (2006). She compiled and wrote the introductions to the edited two-volume work The Price of Freedom: Slavery and the Civil War - Volume I, and The Price of Freedom: Slavery and the Civil War - Volume II , both published in 2000.

== Awards ==
Edna Greene Medford was inducted as a Laureate of The Lincoln Academy of Illinois and awarded the Order of Lincoln (the State’s highest honor) by the Governor of Illinois in 2009 as a Bicentennial Laureate.
