= University of Illinois Press =

American university press

- Parent company: University of Illinois
- Founded: 1918
- Country of origin: United States
- Headquarters location: Champaign, Illinois
- Distribution: Chicago Distribution Center (US); Combined Academic Publishers (EMEA); Scholarly Book Services (Canada); Footprint Books (Australia)
- Publication types: Books, journals
- Official website: press.uillinois.edu

The University of Illinois Press (UIP) is an American university press and is part of the University of Illinois System. Founded in 1918, the press publishes some 120 new books each year, thirty-three scholarly journals, and several electronic projects. Strengths include ethnic and multicultural studies, Lincoln and Illinois history, and the large and diverse series Music in American Life.

UIP was initially founded to oversee the editing, production, and distribution of publications generated within the university. The press has since grown to publish works that contribute to scholarly research, cultural life, and regional and intellectual history. It issues roughly 80 new books and more than 40 scholarly journals each year and maintains a backlist of more than 2,500 titles distributed internationally through publishing partners and sales representatives in North America, Europe, Latin America, and Asia.

Michelle Sybert has served as director since July 2025. In recent years, the press has expanded its commitment to open access publishing, launching pilot programs for books and journals, participating in a library consortium that serves the majority of Illinois higher education institutions, and establishing initiatives such as the Darlene Clark Hine Black History Fund endowment to support scholarship in underrepresented fields.

== Lincoln scholarship ==
UIP publishes the Journal of the Abraham Lincoln Association (JALA), the official journal of the Abraham Lincoln Association, the only peer-reviewed academic journal devoted exclusively to Lincoln scholarship.

UIP publishes the University of Illinois Springfield's Lincoln Studies Series, significant monographs and documentary editions, overseen by series editor Michael Burlingame. UIP also publishes the Knox College Lincoln Studies Center Publication Series, focused on original or new editions of key source materials and scholarly monographs on Lincoln and his era.

== Honors and awards ==
Books from the Press have frequently been honored as Choice Outstanding Academic Titles by the American Library Association's Choice: Current Reviews for Academic Libraries, an annual award recognizing exceptional scholarship suitable for undergraduate library collections. Recent examples include four titles selected in 2024.

In 2018, Graham A. Peck's Making an Antislavery Nation: Lincoln, Douglas, and the Battle over Freedom (2017) was named a finalist for the Gilder Lehrman Lincoln Prize. In 2017, Douglas L. Wilson and Rodney O. Davis received a Special Achievement Award from the Lincoln Prize committee for their edited volume Herndon on Lincoln: Letters (2016), which compiles and annotates letters from William H. Herndon, Lincoln's law partner and early biographer.

== See also ==
- List of English-language book publishing companies
- List of university presses
- Journals published by University of Illinois Press
