= Louise Taper =

American historian

Louise Taper is a historian and collector of Abraham Lincoln artifacts. She is the daughter-in-law of Mark Taper.

She created the exhibition The Last Best Hope of Earth: Abraham Lincoln and the Promise of America which was at the Huntington Library from 1993 to 1994 and at the Chicago Historical Society from 1996 to 1997. She also served as an historical consultant for the television mini-series Sandburg’s Lincoln. She is co-author of the book Right or Wrong, God Judge Me: The Writings of John Wilkes Booth, published by the University of Illinois Press. She serves on the boards of the Abraham Lincoln Association, the Abraham Lincoln Presidential Library and Museum Foundation, the Lincoln Forum, the Lincoln Legal Papers, Center Theatre Group and the Lincoln Prize at Gettysburg College. She is also a trustee of Lincoln College.

She created the Taper collection, which was purchased by the Abraham Lincoln Presidential Library and Museum for what is estimated at $20M. One of the key artifacts in the collection, a stovepipe hat, is surrounded with controversy regarding its authenticity.

== Awards ==
Louise Taper was inducted as a Laureate of The Lincoln Academy of Illinois and awarded the Order of Lincoln (the State's highest honor) by the Governor of Illinois in 2009 as a Bicentennial Laureate.
