= Gabor Boritt =

American historian (1940–2026)

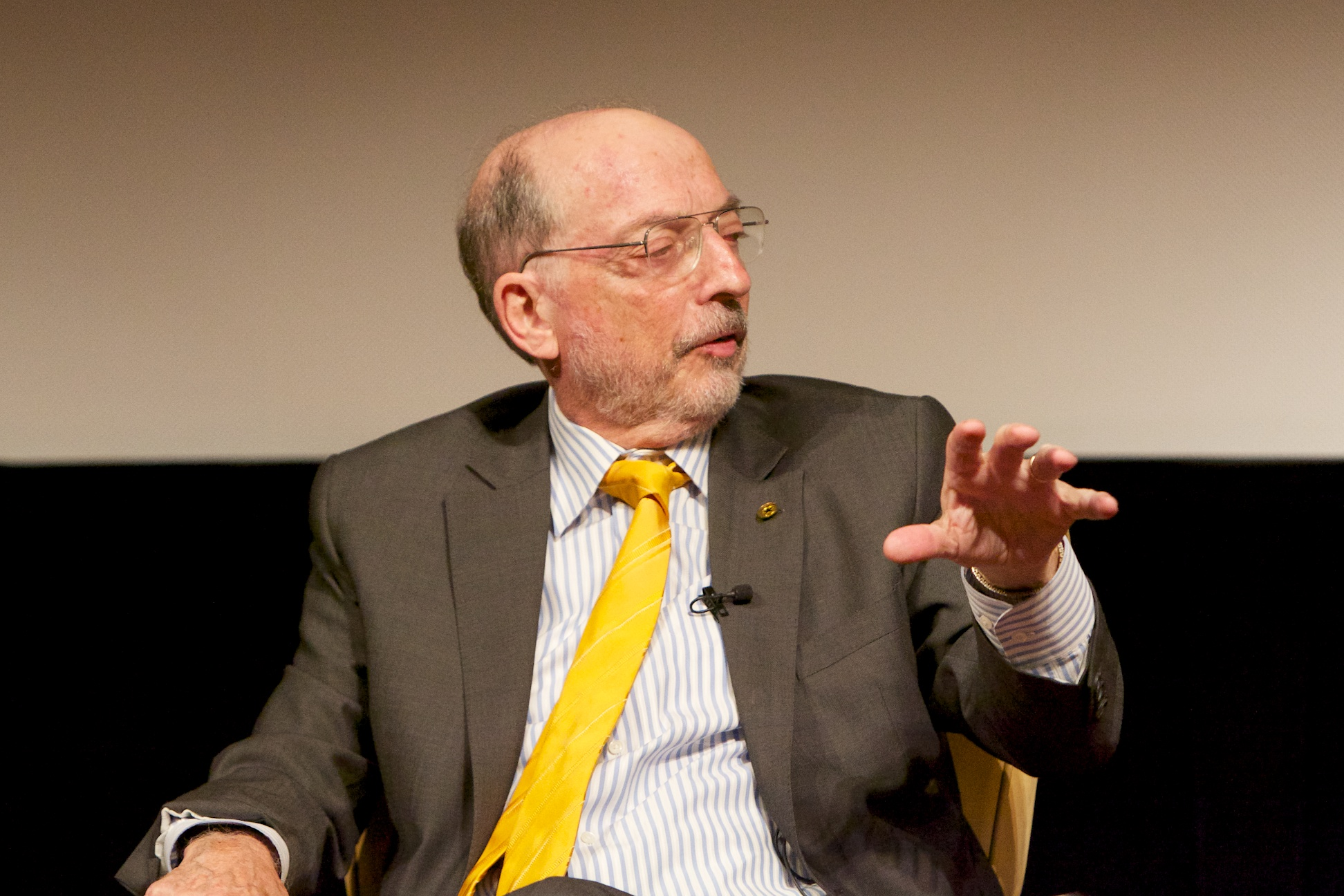
- Boritt in 2014
- Born: Róth-Szappanos Gábor; January 26, 1940; Budapest, Hungary
- Died: February 2, 2026 (aged 86); Chambersburg, Pennsylvania, U.S.
- Children: 3, including Jake and Beowulf
- Awards: National Humanities Medal

Academic background
- Education: Yankton College; University of South Dakota; Boston University

Academic work
- Discipline: Historian
- Sub-discipline: American Civil War and Abraham Lincoln specialist
- Institutions: Gettysburg College; University of Michigan
- Website: www.boritt.com

Gabor Szappanos Boritt (né Róth-Szappanos Gábor; January 26, 1940 – February 2, 2026) was a Hungarian-born American historian. He was the Robert Fluhrer Professor of Civil War Studies and Director of the Civil War Institute at Gettysburg College. Born and raised in Hungary, he participated as a teenager in the Hungarian Revolution of 1956 before escaping to America, where he received his higher education and became a scholar of Abraham Lincoln and the American Civil War. He was the author, co-author, or editor of 16 books about Lincoln or the Civil War. Boritt received the National Humanities Medal in 2008 from President George W. Bush.

== Early life ==
Boritt was born as Róth-Szappanos Gábor on January 26, 1940 to a Jewish family in Budapest, Hungary at the start of World War II. The Nazis forced his family to live in a single room in a hospital on the ghetto's edge, where he played on bloodstained floors. As his father helped lead resistance against the Nazis, his grandfather's family was deported from the countryside and murdered in Auschwitz. By the end of the war, Budapest was in ruins and Hungary in Stalin's grip. In the years that followed, Boritt's mother died, his father and brother were imprisoned, and he was sent to an orphanage. In 1956 sixteen-year-old Boritt joined the 1956 Hungarian Revolution. He remembered the initial euphoria: "We thought it was a whole new world. Anything was possible." Days later, 3,000 Soviet tanks crushed those possibilities, and Boritt and his sister Judith headed for the Austrian border. In darkness, they hiked through wooded hills before coming to a no man's land guarded by men in watchtowers with machine guns. Freedom lay on the other side. Together, they started running.

== Escape to America ==
After months at an Austrian refugee camp, Boritt came to the U.S. with just one dollar in his pocket, arriving in the "dirtiest city" he had ever seen: New York City. Advised to "go west", Boritt headed to South Dakota. He changed his surname to Boritt upon arriving in America, and kept a part of his original surname, Szappanos, as his middle name. Wanting to learn English, he picked up a free booklet of Abraham Lincoln's writings. Captivated by Lincoln's mastery of the language and his rise from poverty to the presidency, Boritt began studying American history and earned his Bachelor of Arts degree from Yankton College in 1962 and a master's degree from the University of South Dakota in 1963, followed by a Ph.D. from Boston University in 1968.

As an immigrant, he felt obliged to go to Vietnam, where he taught soldiers about the American Civil War. In 1978 after deciding to pursue the study of Lincoln from the economic angle, he published his first book Lincoln and the Economics of the American Dream, which placed what Boritt called "the right to rise" at the center of Lincoln's outlook. One of a handful of books on Lincoln published in the 1970s, a 1995 survey of leading experts by Civil War Times lists it as one of the 10 most important books ever written about Lincoln.

== Gettysburg College ==
After teaching at the University of Michigan, in 1981 Boritt came to Gettysburg College, founding the Civil War Institute, where the school created for him the nation's first fully funded chair for the study of the Civil War. He helped create the $50,000 Lincoln Prize, widely considered the most coveted award for the study of American history. He also helped create the Gilder Lehrman Institute, which is focused on improving the teaching of history in schools.

== Modern accomplishments ==
Boritt served on the boards of the Gettysburg National Battlefield Museum Foundation and the Abraham Lincoln Bicentennial Commission, appointed by Congress. His book The Gettysburg Gospel: The Lincoln Speech Nobody Knows (2006) was featured on the cover of U.S. News & World Report and called "fascinating" by The New York Times. In September 2008 Boritt gave a tour of the Gettysburg battlefield to President George W. Bush, Laura Bush, and a group including White House Advisor Karl Rove, former U.S. Attorney General Alberto Gonzalez, and Secretary of Education Margaret Spellings.

On November 17, 2008, President George W. Bush awarded Boritt the National Humanities Medal from the National Endowment for the Humanities "for a distinguished career of scholarship on Abraham Lincoln and the Civil War era. His life's work and his life's story stand as testaments to our nation's precious legacy of liberty". His life story is the subject of a feature-length documentary film titled Budapest to Gettysburg (2007), directed by his son Jake Boritt. In 2009 he retired.

Gabor Boritt was inducted as a Laureate of The Lincoln Academy of Illinois and awarded the Order of Lincoln (the state's highest honor) by the governor of Illinois in 2009 as a Bicentennial Laureate. In 1996, Boritt received The Lincoln Forum's Richard Nelson Current Award of Achievement.

== Personal life and death ==
Boritt and his wife Liz lived in an 18th-century farmhouse on the edge of the Gettysburg battlefield, which they restored with their own hands. It served as both a stop on the Underground Railroad and as a Confederate hospital. Together they raised three sons: Beowulf Boritt is a set designer (and streaming video ad star) in New York City, Jake Boritt is a filmmaker who lives in Harlem, and Daniel Boritt is a biologist specializing in birds who lives in Indianapolis, Indiana.

Gabor Boritt died in Chambersburg, Pennsylvania, of complications of dementia on February 2, 2026, at the age of 86.

== Works ==
=== Author ===
- Lincoln and the Economics of the American Dream (1978) (ASIN B010TTIP5I)
- Changing the Lincoln Image (1985) (with Harold Holzer and Mark E. Neely Jr.) (ASIN B001Q90WOI)
- "War Opponent and War President", in Gabor Boritt, ed. (1992). Lincoln, the War President: The Gettysburg Lectures. Oxford University Press. ISBN 0-19-507891-8.
- "'And the War Came'? Abraham Lincoln and the Question of Individual Responsibility", in Gabor Boritt, ed. (1996). Why the Civil War Came. Oxford University Press. ISBN 0-19-507941-8.
- "Did He Dream of a Lily-White America: The Voyage to Linconia", in Gabor Boritt, ed. (2001). The Lincoln Enigma: The Changing Faces of an American Icon. Oxford University Press. ISBN 0-19-514458-9.
- The Lincoln Image: Abraham Lincoln and the Popular Print (2005) (with Harold Holzer and Mark E. Neely Jr.) (ISBN 978-0252069840)
- The Gettysburg Gospel: The Lincoln Speech That Nobody Knows (2006) (ISBN 978-0743288217)

=== Editor ===
- The Historian's Lincoln: Pseudohistory, Psychohistory, and History (1988) (ISBN 978-0252065446)
- Why the Confederacy Lost (1992) (ASIN B0099L2F9A)
- Lincoln, The War President: The Gettysburg Lectures (1992) (ISBN 9780195078916)
- Lincoln's Generals (1995) (ISBN 978-0195101102)
- War Comes Again: Comparative Vistas on the Civil War and World War II (1995) (ISBN 978-0195088458)
- Why the Civil War Came (1996) (ISBN 0-19-507941-8)
- The Gettysburg Nobody Knows (1997) (ISBN 978-0195102239)
- Jefferson Davis's Generals (1999) (ISBN 978-0195120622)
- The Lincoln Enigma: The Changing Faces of an American Icon (2002) (ISBN 978-0195156263)
- Slavery, Resistance, Freedom (2009) (edited with Scott Hancock) (ISBN 978-0195384604)
- The Will of God Prevails: Meditations on God and the Gettysburg Address (2014) (words of Abraham Lincoln compiled and edited by Gabor Boritt) (ISBN 978-1626207202)

== See also ==
- Civil War Institute at Gettysburg College
- Lincoln Prize
- Gilder Lehrman Institute of American History
- Gettysburg College
