= Roy Basler =

American historian (1906–1989)

- Born: Roy Prentice Basler; November 19, 1906; St. Louis, Missouri, U.S.
- Died: October 25, 1989 (aged 82); Sarasota, Florida, U.S.
- Education: Central Methodist College; Duke University (PhD)
- Occupation: Historian
- Known for: Editing the collected works of Abraham Lincoln

Roy Prentice Basler (November 19, 1906 – October 25, 1989) was an American historian who rose to prominence in the middle of the 20th century. Basler was most famous for editing the collected works of Abraham Lincoln. He also wrote the introduction to Sam Watkins' "Co Aytch".

== Biography ==
Basler was born in St. Louis and attended Central Methodist College in Fayette, Missouri, before receiving his PhD in American literature at Duke University. He headed the English departments at Ringling College, Florence State Teachers' College and Peabody College, and was executive secretary and editor-in-chief of the Abraham Lincoln Association from 1947 to 1952. He joined the staff of the Library of Congress in 1952 and eventually became chief of the manuscript division and held the library's chair in American history. He retired in 1974 and moved to Sarasota, Florida, where he died in 1989.

Basler's definitive eight volume collection of Lincoln's writings was published in 1953 and a supplement was released in 1974. It has been described as "the principal source" and "the most invaluable work of all" for Lincoln studies.

== Bibliography ==
- The Lincoln Legend: A Study in Changing Conceptions. By Roy Basler. Boston: Houghton Mifflin, 1935.
- The Collected Works of Abraham Lincoln. By Abraham Lincoln (Author), Roy P. Basler (Editor). New Brunswick, New Jersey: Rutgers University Press, 1953.
- The Muse and the Librarian. Westport, Conn: Greenwood Press, 1974.
