= Abraham Lincoln Bicentennial Foundation =

The Abraham Lincoln Bicentennial Foundation is the successor organization of the U.S. Abraham Lincoln Bicentennial Commission (ALBC), which was created by Congress and the President of the United States to plan the commemoration of Abraham Lincoln’s 200th birthday in 2009. The Abraham Lincoln Bicentennial Commission sunset on April 30, 2010.

The foundation is committed to initiating and supporting innovative and historically meaningful national, state, and local programs that commemorate the memory and sustain the ideals and historic impact of America’s sixteenth president, particularly during the five-year observances of the American Civil War sesquicentennial. Building on the ALBC’s original focus on early education, professional scholarship, online access, publications, public programs, and community-based programming, the foundation will offer support, sponsorship, expertise, and encouragement to non-profit initiatives devoted to sharing knowledge, preserving historic sites and artifacts, and engaging diverse audiences on the subjects of leadership, freedom, equality, and opportunity.

== History ==
During its nine years of active existence, the ALBC created a foundation to raise private funding to support its events, publications, educational outreach, and website activities. Former U.S. Congressman Bill Gray and the late Congressman and HUD Secretary Jack Kemp served as the original chairmen of the foundation, and steered it toward future independence. In the period immediately preceding and following the sunset of the ALBC in the summer of 2009, historians Jean Soman of Florida and Orville Vernon Burton of South Carolina, respectively, served as interim chairs of the Foundation.

In 2009 and 2010, the foundation reconstituted itself, electing an expanded board and a new chairman, historian Harold Holzer of New York, who had co-chaired the ALBC. The foundation announced its new board and extended mission on February 10, 2011, at an introductory event at the Willard in Washington, the hotel where Abraham Lincoln and his family resided in the ten days immediately preceding his inauguration as President 150 years earlier in 1861

The foundation also announced that it had committed in its initial round of funding to co-sponsor and provide financial support for two planned Washington-based activities and one Lincoln-related historic site in Pennsylvania.

- An all-day 150th commemoration of the sesquicentennial of the National Peace Conference at the Willard (February 1861), the last major effort to reverse secession and civil war. Funding for “The Peace Convention at 150: A Call to Compromise” at the Willard Intercontinental Hotel, Washington, will help support an all-day scholarly symposium, the creation and installation of a commemorative plaque, and performance of Lincoln’s speeches by actor Stephen Lang. The project was initiated and is organized by the Lincoln at the Crossroads Alliance.
- Conditional support and co-sponsorship of a 150th anniversary of Lincoln’s first inauguration (March 4, 1861), scheduled for Saturday, March 5, 2011, with a ceremony and re-enactment at the U.S. Capitol Visitors Center in Washington, and a luncheon program and historians’ remarks at the Willard Hotel. The event was initiated and will be organized by the Lincoln Group of the District of Columbia.
- Support to help staff and maintain for one year the Historic Gettysburg Railroad Station, the landmark depot still standing along the tracks where Lincoln arrived on November 18, 1863, to deliver his most famous speech. Scheduled to be acquired by the National Park Service, the building became a visitor destination in 2007, but was threatened with a shutdown pending NPS takeover.

Since its inception, the Foundation has awarded several hundred thousand dollars' worth of grants to educational, performance, research, and programmatic activities in a number of states.

For three consecutive years, the Foundation has co-sponsored a public history program with HistoryMiami to explore areas of Lincoln and Civil War history. Speakers have included some of the leading experts in the field, including Craig L. Symonds, "Bud" Robertson, and James M. McPherson.

== Foundation board ==
- Harold Holzer, Rye, NY, chairman, former co-chair (with Senator Dick Durbin and Rep. Ray La Hood) of the Lincoln Bicentennial Commission, author, co-author, or editor of 41 books and more than 450 articles about Lincoln and political culture of the Civil War, among other honors, awarded the National Humanities Medal by President of the U.S. in 2008; Senior Vice President for Public Affairs, The Metropolitan Museum of Art.
- Dr. Darrel Bigham, Evansville, IN, professor of history emeritus at the University of Southern Indiana, and Director of Historic Southern Indiana; former member of the ALBC (chair, education committee) and Lincoln States Bicentennial Task Force; author of several books; has served as president of Vanderburgh County Historical Society, Evansville Arts & Education Council, and Indiana Association of Historians.
- Dr. Orville Vernon Burton, Ninety Six, SC, former interim ALBF chairman, currently vice chairman; award-winning author and teacher; emeritus University Distinguished Teacher/Scholar and Professor of History, African-American Studies, and Sociology, University of Illinois; currently Professor of History and Director, Clemson University Cyberinstitute; also president elect, Southern Historical Association.
- Thomas Campbell, Chicago, IL, senior counsel at Chicago office of Baker & McKenzie law firm; noted litigator and appeals lawyer specializing in antitrust actions, mergers, mediating business disputes, and Federal Trade Commission rulings; historian of Chicago abolitionist movement; author of book on antebellum Chicago; lecturer and writer on antitrust legal issues and developments; serves as Treasurer of ALBF.
- David Lawrence Jr., Coral Gables, FL, retired publisher of the Miami Herald, is President of the Early Childhood Initiative Foundation, and University Scholar for Early Childhood Development and Readiness at the University of Florida; member, governor’s children’s cabinet, board of several childhood development organizations; former publisher of Detroit Free Press, and editor of The Charlotte Observer.
- Dr. Edna Greene Medford, Bowie, MD, professor of history and chair of the history department at Howard University in Washington; former advisor to the Lincoln Presidential Library; leading authority on African-American and U.S. 19th-century history; pioneer leader of the African Burial Grounds project, advisor to the ALBC, author of several books and well-known lecturer, winner “Order of Lincoln,” 2009.
- Antonio Mora, Miami, FL, is the evening and late-night news anchor for CBS4 in Miami, having appeared previously on ABC’S Good Morning America, and on the CBS affiliate in Chicago, where he was the first Hispanic-American to hold anchor posts in that city; earlier held news posts in Los Angeles and on Telemundo and ESPN; a former practicing attorney, his many honors include two Peabody awards and several Emmys.
- Charles Scholz, Quincy, IL, is the former mayor of Quincy (1993–2005) and currently practices law in his hometown with the firm of Scholz & Scholz LLP; previously served as Illinois Assistant Attorney General, and as downstate political director for late U.S. Senator Paul Simon; chaired the Lincoln Bicentennial at Quincy (a Lincoln-Douglas debate site); previously served on the ALBC advisory board; serves as ALBF Secretary.
- Jean Powers Soman, Pinecrest, FL, author/editor, direct descendant of Jewish Union Col. Marcus Spiegel, has researched and written on his life, also researching great-grandfather Samuel Alschuler, photographer of Lincoln; served on ALBC advisory board and was interim chair of ALBF; fellow of Historical Museum of South Florida, member of EZRA consortium of American Jewish Archives, advisory board of Jewish Museum of Florida.
- Hon. Frank J. Williams, Hope Valley, RI, former member of the ALBC, founding chairman of The Lincoln Forum, former President of the Abraham Lincoln Association and the Lincoln Group of Boston, serves as President of the Ulysses S. Grant Association, leading Lincoln collector, lecturer, editor, writer, author of more than a dozen books on Lincoln; retired Chief Justice of Rhode Island Supreme Court.

== Applying for sponsorship and support ==
The Lincoln Bicentennial Foundation has issued a call for further requests for support, sponsorship, and endorsement, and announced that it would consider such proposals at its regularly scheduled quarterly meetings.

Accredited not-for-profit organizations and societies are encouraged to seek support and sponsorship from the ALBF for relevant projects and events. All requests that meet the spirit of the Foundation mission will be seriously and respectfully considered.
