= Mark E. Neely Jr. =

American historian (born 1944)

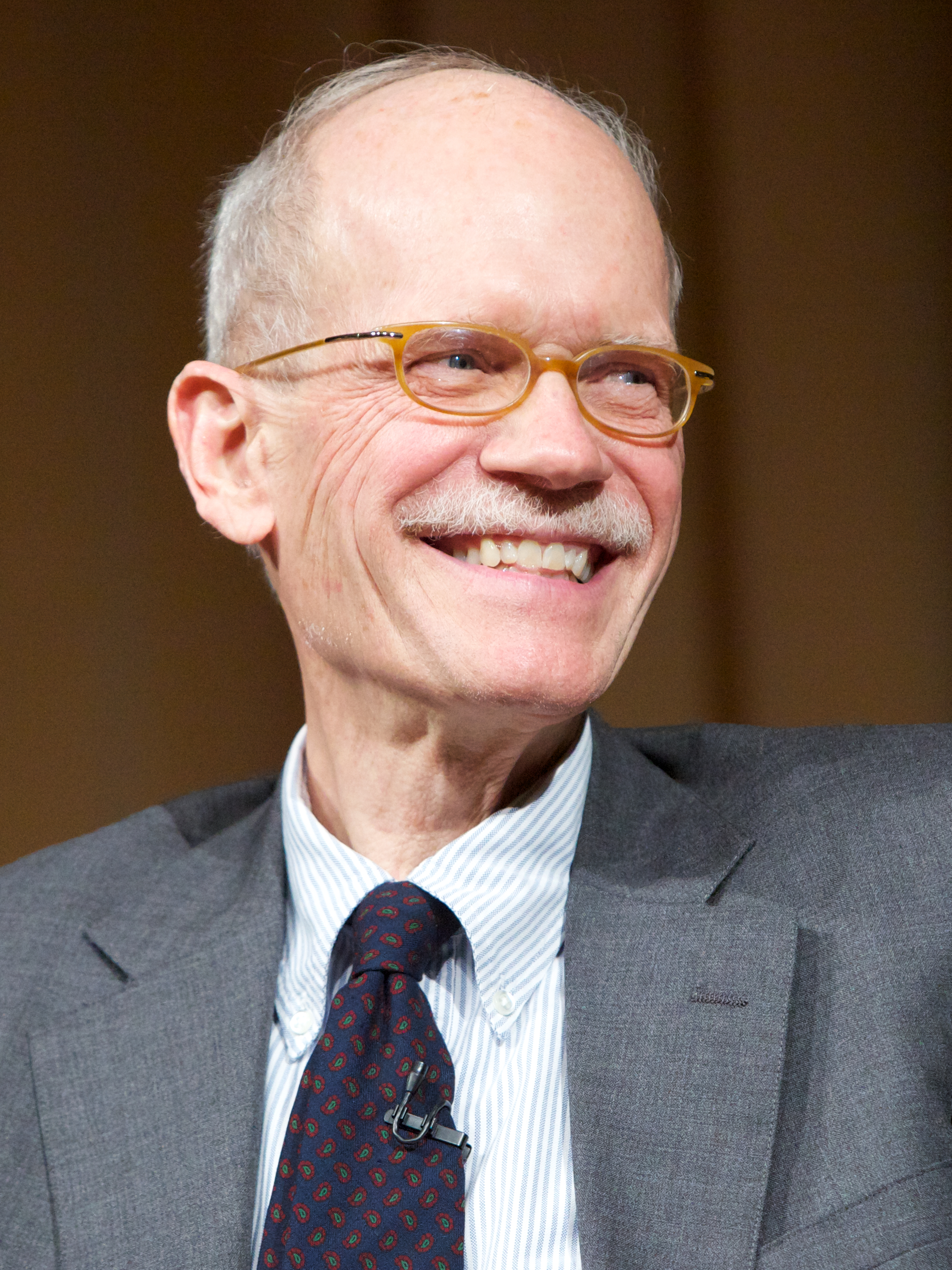
Neely in 2012

Mark E. Neely Jr. (born November 10, 1944, in Amarillo, Texas) is an American historian best known as an authority on the U.S. Civil War in general and Abraham Lincoln in particular.

== Biography ==
Neely was born in Texas. He earned his BA in American Studies and PhD in history at Yale University in 1966 and 1973. Yale's Graduate School awarded him a Wilbur Cross Medal in 1995.

In 1971–1972 Neely was a visiting instructor at Iowa State University. In 1972 he was named director of the Lincoln Museum in Fort Wayne, Indiana, a position he held for 20 years.

In 1992 Dr. Neely was named the John Francis Bannon Professor of History and American Studies at Saint Louis University. In 1998 he was named the McCabe Greer Professor of Civil War History at Pennsylvania State University.

Neely is best known for his 1991 book The Fate of Liberty: Abraham Lincoln and Civil Liberties, which won both the 1992 Pulitzer Prize for History and the 1992 Bell I. Wiley Award. In March 1991 he published an article in the magazine Civil War History entitled "Was the Civil War a Total War?," which is considered one of the three most influential articles on the war written in the last half of the 20th century.

According to the review in the Journal of American History, his 2011 book Lincoln and the Triumph of the Nation "is a meticulous study of Civil War-era constitutionalism, a complex and multifaceted book.... Neely has written what is perhaps the most important study of its kind to appear in the last 20 years."

In 2010, Neely received The Lincoln Forum's Richard Nelson Current Award of Achievement.

== Works ==
External videos
- Booknotes with Neely on The Last Best Hope of Earth, June 12, 1994, C-SPAN
- Presentation by Neely on Lincoln and the Triumph of the Nation, September 16, 2012, C-SPAN

- 1981 – The Abraham Lincoln Encyclopedia
- 1984 – (with Gabor S. Boritt and Harold Holzer) The Lincoln Image: Abraham Lincoln and the Popular Print
- 1985 – (with Gabor S. Boritt and Harold Holzer) Changing The Lincoln Image
- 1986 – (with R. Gerald McMurtry) The Insanity File: The Case of Mary Todd Lincoln
- 1987 – (with Boritt and Holzer) The Confederate Image: Prints of the Lost Cause
- 1990 – (with Holzer) The Lincoln Family Album
- 1991 – The Fate of Liberty: Abraham Lincoln and Civil Liberties (winner of the Pulitzer and Wiley prizes, as mentioned above)
- 1993 – (with Holzer) Mine Eyes Have Seen the Glory: The Civil War in America
- 1993 – The Last Best Hope of Earth: Abraham Lincoln and the Promise of American (for which he received the Alpha Sigma Nu Book Award from the National Jesuit Honor Society)
- 1999 – Southern Rights: Political Prisoners and the Myth of Confederate Constitutionalism
- 2000 – (with Holzer) The Union Image: Popular Prints in the Civil War North
- 2002 – The Union Divided: Party Conflict in the Civil War North
- 2005 – The Boundaries of American Political Culture in the Civil War Era online
- 2007 – The Civil War and the Limits of Destruction
- 2011 – Lincoln and the Triumph of the Nation: Constitutional Conflict in the American Civil War (covers the U.S. and the Confederate constitutions and their role in the conflict)
- 2017 – Lincoln and the Democrats: The Politics of Opposition in the Civil War
