= The Fate of Liberty =

1991 book by Mark E. Neely, Jr.

The Fate of Liberty: Abraham Lincoln and Civil Liberties
- 1991 Book jacket
- Author: Mark E. Neely, Jr.
- Genre: history
- Publisher: Oxford University Press
- Publication date: 1991
- Publication place: United States
- Pages: 304
- Awards: Pulitzer Prize for History
- ISBN: 9780195064964 978-0195080322
- OCLC: 21117404

The Fate of Liberty: Abraham Lincoln and Civil Liberties is a 1991 book by American historian Mark E. Neely, Jr., published by Oxford University Press. The book examines President Abraham Lincoln's suspension of habeas corpus and other rights during the American Civil War. The book was awarded the 1992 Pulitzer Prize for History.
