= Jake Boritt =

American filmmaker

Jake Boritt is an American documentary filmmaker and producer.

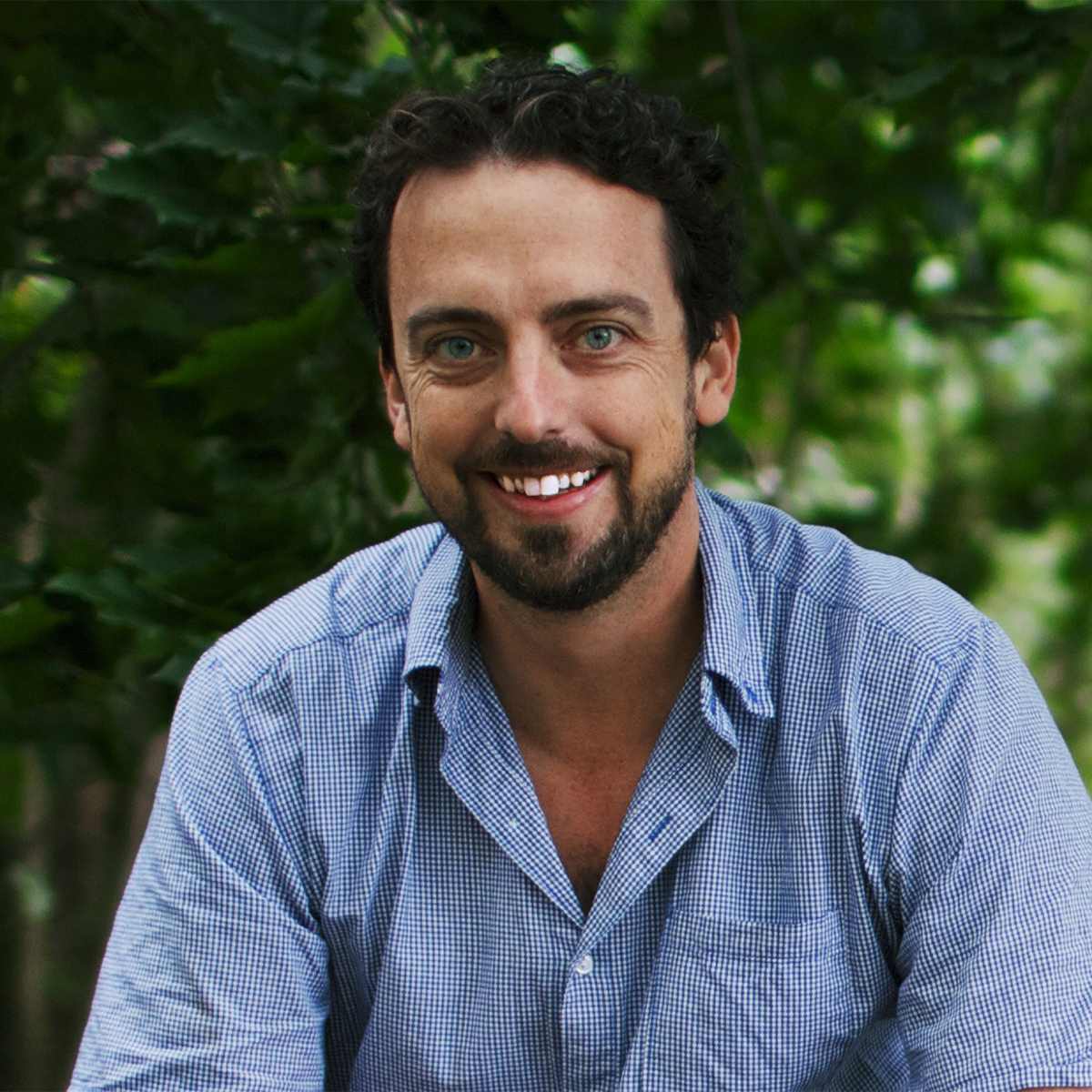
Boritt in 2012

== Biography ==
Boritt graduated from Johns Hopkins University, where he studied under multi-National Book Award nominee Stephen Dixon. Boritt was raised on a Civil War farm in Gettysburg that served as a stop on the Underground Railroad and a Confederate hospital during the battle.

Boritt was a producer on Rory Kennedy's Moxie-Firecracker production "The Homestead Strike", part of the Emmy winning History Channel series "10 Days That Changed America." Boritt worked on productions for HBO, A&E, AMC and CourtTV and on David Grubin's "Young Doctor Freud" and "Kofi Annan: Center of the Storm" (PBS).

In 2003, Boritt shot and produced an anthropological documentary with a tribe in Borneo called "The Internet and the Water Buffalo," exploring the effects of a satellite internet connection in a remote indigenous village in the interior jungle highlands. It screened at the American Anthropological Association.

Boritt's 2007 film "Budapest to Gettysburg" explored the story of his father Professor Gabor Boritt, a Lincoln and Civil War scholar who returned to Hungary to find his roots. "Budapest to Gettysburg" was selected for the 2007 IFP Independent Film Week in New York and screened at the Museum of Fine Arts in Boston as part of the Boston Jewish Film Festival.

Boritt's short documentary for the United Nations and Project Gaia followed Somali refugees in Ethiopia's Ogaden Desert and the Clean Cook revolution. This project, "Cooking to Live", featured music by hip-hop artist K'Naan, and in 2009 it premiered at COP15: United Nations Conference on Climate Change. Boritt also produced several short films for the United Nations Development Program: South South Cooperation featuring actor Danny Glover.

In 2010 his film "759: Boy Scouts of Harlem" was broadcast nationally on public television via Maryland Public Television. The film premiered at the Schomburg Center for Research in Black Culture in Harlem and screened on the USS Intrepid (CV-11) and in the United States Capitol sponsored by Senators Ike Skelton and Jeff Sessions.

Jake Boritt directed the documentary The Gettysburg Story in 2013. In 2010 he wrote and produced "The Gettysburg Story: Battlefield Auto Tour" performed by actor Stephen Lang for the Gettysburg Battlefield.

In 2023 and 2024, Boritt was the Festival Director for the first and second annual Ken Burns Film Festivals in Gettysburg, PA.
