= Abraham Lincoln Association =

American history organization

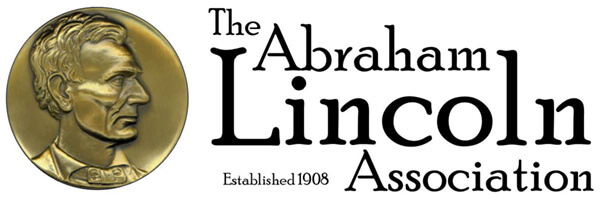
- Formation: 1908 (as the Lincoln Centennial Association)
- Type: Nonprofit, member-supported
- Headquarters: Springfield, Illinois, USA
- President: Joshua Claybourn
- Main organ: Board of directors
- Website: abrahamlincolnassociation.org

The Abraham Lincoln Association (ALA) is an American nonprofit organization advancing studies on Abraham Lincoln and disseminating scholarship about Lincoln. The ALA was founded in 1908 in Springfield, Illinois, as the Lincoln Centennial Association, to lead a national celebration the following year of Lincoln's 100th birthday. Renamed the Abraham Lincoln Association in 1929, it has since become a leading authority on Lincoln scholarship, promoting research, education, and public engagement through publications, events, and preservation efforts. The ALA holds no archive of materials and instead functions primarily as a scholarly forum. It remains "the nation's oldest and largest Lincoln organization."

== History ==
The ALA was formed in 1908 as the Lincoln Centennial Association to help lead the national celebrations of Lincoln's 100th birthday the following year. The ALA's founders included United States Supreme Court Chief Justice Melville Weston Fuller, financier John Whitfield Bunn, United States Federal Judge J. Otis Humphrey, Speaker of the House Joseph G. Cannon, Illinois Governor Charles S. Deneen, Vice President Adlai E. Stevenson, and Illinois Senator Shelby Cullom. It hosted its inaugural centennial celebration in 1909 at the Illinois State Armory, featuring keynote speakers such as British Ambassador James Bryce, French Ambassador J.J. Jusserand, Robert Todd Lincoln, and William Jennings Bryan.

In 1925, under the leadership of ALA President Logan Hay, Paul M. Angle became the ALA's first executive secretary. Angle led an effort in 1929 to change the organization's name to the Abraham Lincoln Association and, together with Benjamin Thomas and Harry Pratt, established the association's research and publication programs. In 1929, Angle exposed forged love letters between Lincoln and Ann Rutledge, upholding scholarly integrity in the field. In 1930 the ALA produced the monograph New Letters and Papers of Lincoln.

Under the leadership of president George W. Bunn, the ALA launched the Abraham Lincoln Quarterly, a scholarly publication that would replace prior ALA publications, and a massive project to collect and transcribe all of Abraham Lincoln's known writings which eventually culminated in The Collected Works of Abraham Lincoln, edited by Roy P. Basler, Marion Dolores Pratt, and Lloyd A. Dunlap. It was published in eight volumes (plus an index) between 1953 and 1955, with two supplemental volumes published in 1974 and 1990. The Collected Works of Abraham Lincoln found critical success but strained the ALA financially.

Throughout the 1950s, 1960s, and 1970s the ALA continued undertaking various commemoration projects and engaging in scholarship. It developed comprehensive day-by-day chronologies of Lincoln's life from 1809 to 1861, published as Lincoln Day By Day, which have been instrumental in authenticating documents and debunking forgeries. Other ALA publications include Benjamin Thomas's Lincoln’s New Salem (1934) and Paul Angle's “Here I Have Lived”: A History of Lincoln’s Springfield, 1821-1865 (1935).

In early 1995, several acclaimed historians—including Harold Holzer and then-ALA president Frank J. Williams—left the ALA board of directors and formed their own scholarly group, the Lincoln Forum, following "policy disagreements, alleged conflicts of interest, strong personalities and claims from out-of-town historians that they had been refused access to Lincoln materials." In 2005, with the opening of the Abraham Lincoln Presidential Library, scholars of both organizations came together to "mend damaged fences from what's been called a 'civil war' within the Lincoln academic community."

== Governance ==
The Abraham Lincoln Association is a 501(c)(3) non-profit organization incorporated in the state of Illinois. It relies on membership dues, donations, and an endowment fund established to support its operations. The ALA is governed by a board of directors made up of nationally renowned Lincoln scholars and philanthropists dedicated to the ALA's cause. The ALA's board of directors include:

- Kenneth L. Anderson
- Reg Ankrom
- William Bartelt
- Roger D. Billings Jr.
- Robert Bunn
- Michael F. Bishop
- Michael Burlingame
- Joshua Claybourn
- James Cornelius
- Jason Emerson
- Guy C. Fraker
- Jacob K. Friefeld
- Joseph Garrera
- Donald R. Graham
- Allen C. Guelzo
- Kathryn M. Harris
- Thomas Horrocks
- Ron Keller
- Michelle A. Krowl
- Andrew Lang
- David Leroy
- Sue Massie
- Dan Monroe
- James W. Patton III
- Tiffany A. Player
- Mark Pohlad
- Ted Quill
- Roger D. Rudich
- Scott T. Schroeder
- William G. Shepherd
- Ronald D. Spears
- Ruth E. Squillace
- Louise Taper
- Sarah S. Watson
- David Webster
- David B. Wiegers
- Daniel R. Weinberg
- Jonathan W. White
- Bob Willard

== Publications ==
The ALA's semi-annual Journal of the Abraham Lincoln Association is the only journal devoted exclusively to the history and legacies of Abraham Lincoln. The journal is led by an executive editor and an editor, currently Michael Burlingame and Christian McWhirter, with guidance from a publications committee. Each submission receives anonymous review from at least two specialists in the field, who assess the depth of research, strength of analysis, originality, and scholarly importance. The review process usually runs four to five months. Since the late 1980s, JALA has appeared twice a year, in spring and fall. Historian David Herbert Donald said "The Journal of the Abraham Lincoln Association is the most important periodical in the field of Lincoln studies. As a Lincoln biographer, I rely on it heavily for both ideas and information." The ALA also publishes a quarterly newsletter, For the People.

The ALA's crowning publication is The Collected Works of Abraham Lincoln, edited by Roy P. Basler, Marion Dolores Pratt, and Lloyd A. Dunlap. It was published in 8 volumes (plus an index) between 1953 and 1955, with two supplemental volumes published in 1974 and 1990 and is now available online to the public at the association's website. Basler's Collected Works has become a standard resource for Lincoln and Civil War scholarship, but it suffers from limitations and omissions. Collected Works did not include incoming correspondence to Lincoln, which denies the reader important context. New technology and the development of documentary editing as a discipline allows for more faithful renditions of the texts. And in the nearly 60 years since the publication of Collected Works, many new Lincoln documents have been discovered, providing new opportunities for historical scholarship.

== Events and programs ==
=== Banquet and symposium ===
The ALA hosts an annual banquet and symposium each year on Lincoln's birthday (February 12). Past speakers include Michael Beschloss (2008), Jon Meacham (2007 and 2022), and Doris Kearns Goodwin (2006). On February 12, 2009, President Barack Obama attended the ALA celebration as the guest of honor, giving a speech titled "What the People Need Done".

=== Awards ===
The ALA sponsors several awards, including the Spirit of Abraham Lincoln Award, the Logan Hay Medal, Lincoln the Lawyer Award, Hay-Nicolas Dissertation Prize Winner, and a Student Award.

The Hay-Nicolas Dissertation Prize recognizes and encourages young scholars who conduct research on Abraham Lincoln and his times. It is awarded each year by the ALA and Abraham Lincoln Institute to recognize the best dissertation dealing with Lincoln and his legacy. The ALA and Abraham Lincoln Institute select the recipients.
