= Civil War Institute at Gettysburg College =

Academic unit studying the US Civil War

Civil War Institute
- Established: 1982
- Affiliations: Gettysburg College
- Director: Peter S. Carmichael
- Website: www.gettysburg.edu/cwi

The Civil War Institute (CWI) at Gettysburg College is a non-profit organization (due to being a part of Gettysburg College and is not a separate legal entity) created to promote the study of the American Civil War Era. The CWI was founded in 1982 by historian and Gettysburg College professor Gabor Boritt, an Abraham Lincoln and American Civil War scholar. The current director is Peter S. Carmichael. The Institute helps coordinate a number of Civil War-related events for the public, including the Robert Fortenbaugh Memorial Lecture, an annual program designed to commemorate Abraham Lincoln's Gettysburg Address, as well as a week-long summer conference that hosts 400 participants annually. The CWI also supports student learning at Gettysburg College, offering several programs throughout the year to help students hone their skills as young historians.

== Summer Conference ==
The CWI hosts an annual summer conference on the Civil War, drawing over 400 people annually. Each year, the conference focuses on a different Civil War theme. Past themes have included the Battle of Gettysburg, the Battle of Fredericksburg, Robert E. Lee, the navy and the cavalry, and Reconstruction. While most participants stay in Gettysburg College dorms during the week, local attendees can choose to forgo living expenses and commute each day.

Lecturers and tour guides are chosen for recent scholarship and expertise on the conference's central theme. The CWI has hosted a number of prominent historians, including James M. McPherson, Harold Holzer, Brooks D. Simpson, Gary Gallagher, and Jennifer Murray.

== Robert Fortenbaugh Memorial Lecture ==
The Robert Fortenbaugh Memorial Lecture is an annual lecture on an American Civil War-related topic, aimed at appealing to the general public while still providing strong scholarly undertones. The lecture is held on November 19 in Gettysburg, Pennsylvania, on the anniversary of Abraham Lincoln's Gettysburg Address. The Civil War Institute at Gettysburg College coordinates the lecture.

== Brian C. Pohanka Internship Program ==
The CWI partners with National Park Service sites and other nationally significant historic places to offer students paid summer internships in the field of public history. During their internships, students gain experience in fields such as interpretation, curation, or education at roughly 15 sites including Gettysburg National Military Park, Petersburg National Battlefield, and Stratford Hall. The program was established in 2011 in honor of Civil War historian Brian Pohanka.

== CWI Fellows Program ==
Each year, the CWI selects roughly a dozen Gettysburg College students as paid fellows to conduct original research and publish it on the CWI blog The Gettysburg Compiler, assist CWI staff with their research, and support CWI programs and events.

== See also ==
- Gettysburg College
- Gabor Boritt
- Allen C. Guelzo
- Pennsylvania Hall
- American Civil War
