= The Lincoln Academy of Illinois =

Non-profit organization issuing awards to people in Illinois

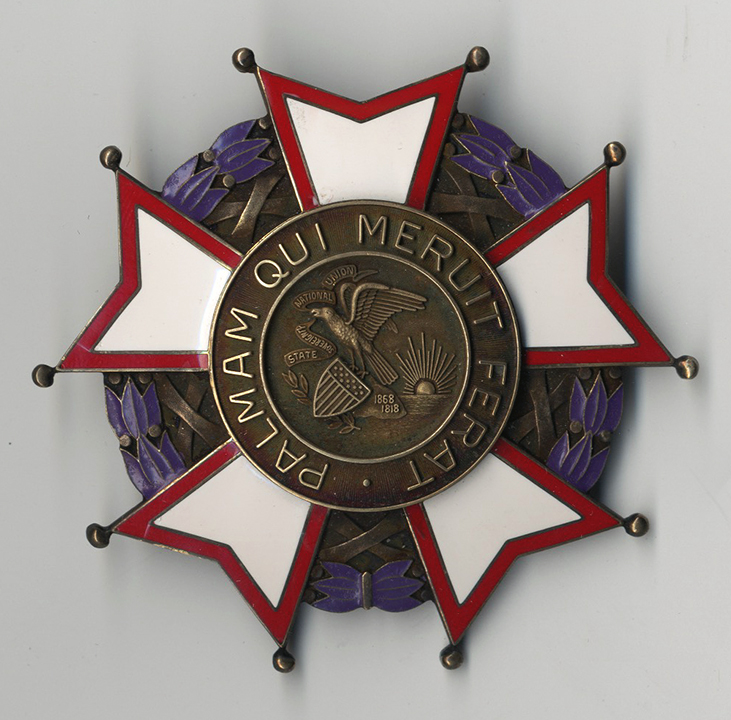
- The breast star of the Order of Lincoln: the Great Seal of Illinois circled by the Latin inscription, Palmam Qui Meruit Ferat (English: The one who has earned the palm [it], bears the reward)
- Formation: December 2, 1964; 61 years ago
- Founders: Michael Butler and Governor Otto Kerner, Jr.
- Type: Non-profit corporation
- Purpose: Recognize contributions made by living Illinoisans
- Headquarters: Springfield, Illinois
- Region served: Illinois
- President: Governor of Illinois
- Chancellor: Frank Clark
- Vice-Chancellor: The Honorable Ronald Dean Spears
- Executive Director: Leanne Barnhart
- Website: thelincolnacademyofillinois.org

The Lincoln Academy of Illinois is a not-for-profit, non-partisan organization dedicated to recognizing contributions made by living Illinoisans. Named for Abraham Lincoln, the Academy administers the Order of Lincoln, the highest award given by the State of Illinois. Each year several persons are selected as Lincoln Laureates at a ceremony presided over by its president, the Governor of Illinois. The organization also gives an annual Student Laureate award to one student from each four-year degree-granting institution of higher learning in Illinois, plus one student from the state's community colleges. As of 2025, almost 500 prominent Illinoisans have been awarded the Order of Lincoln, since the award's creation in 1965.

== History ==
After visiting the Illinois exhibit at the 1964 New York World's Fair, the then head of the state's Organization for Economic Development and a theater producer, Michael Butler, was inspired to start an organization to honor distinguished Illinoisans. Butler submitted a proposal to this effect to Governor Otto Kerner, Jr. The Governor accepted the proposal and named Butler the first Chancellor of The Lincoln Academy of Illinois on December 2, 1964. The first convocation to honor Lincoln Laureates was held on February 12, 1965, at the Chicago Historical Society. As of 2013 over 300 Illinoisans have received the award.

The Academy began awarding Student Laureate awards to outstanding college students in 1975.

== Organization ==
The Academy is overseen by the President, who is the incumbent governor of Illinois. Five other officers are elected for four-year terms by 18 Regents, who act as the board of directors. The chief executive officer is deemed the Chancellor. The Vice-Chancellor performs the duties of the Chancellor in his/her absence. Administrative duties are carried out by the Executive Director, finances are handled by the Treasurer, and meeting minutes are taken by the Secretary.

The 18 Regents are elected from among the Trustees. There are three types of trustees: General Trustees, Academic Trustees, and Rectors. There are 60 General Trustees, appointed for six-year terms by the Academy President or Trustees. The Academic Trustees are the chief executives of degree-granting institutions in the state, plus the presidents of multi-campus four-year institutions and a representative of the Illinois Community College Board. The ten Rectors trustees, represent each of the ten categories in which the award is given.

== Order of Lincoln Award ==
The Lincoln Academy elects several Laureates annually to the Order of Lincoln, the highest award given by the State of Illinois. The award is presented at a ceremony presided over by the President of the Academy (the Governor of Illinois). The ceremony rotates every three years between Springfield, Chicago, and other areas of the state. Honorees are presented with the Badge of the Academy and a citation of reasons for their selection.

Nominees are usually Illinoisans by birth or residence. Nominations are solicited from the Academy's Officers, Regents, and Rectors. Past Laureates and certain academics may also submit nominations. Candidates are nominated for their contributions to ten fields: agriculture; the arts and performing arts; business, industry and communications; education; government and law; labor; medicine and science; religion; social services; and sports. Laureates are selected at a meeting of the Regents and Trustees.

=== Selected honorees ===
- Roger Adams, organic chemist who discovered cannabidiol, awarded 1967
- John Bardeen, physicist and electrical engineer, twice Nobel Prize laureate, awarded 1965
- George Wells Beadle, Nobel Prize laureate 1958, awarded 1966
- Emily Bear, composer and pianist, awarded 2018
- Joseph Bernardin, bishop, awarded 1997
- Gwendolyn Brooks, poet, awarded 1997
- Avery Brundage, fifth President of the International Olympic Committee, awarded 1965
- Hillary Clinton, United States Secretary of State, awarded 2014
- Jean Driscoll, wheelchair racer, awarded 2012
- Roger Ebert, Pulitzer prize winning film critic, awarded 2001
- Rudolph Ganz, pianist, conductor and composer, awarded 1965
- Paul Harvey, radio broadcaster, awarded 1987
- Burl Ives, singer, musician, actor, and author.
- Mahalia Jackson, gospel singer, recording artist and civil rights activist, awarded 1967
- Valerie Jarrett, civic leader, lawyer, author, and political advisor, awarded 2026
- Jackie Joyner-Kersee, track and field athlete, awarded 2005
- Blair Kamin, architectural critic, author and lecturer, awarded 2026
- Shahid Khan, auto parts billionaire, philanthropist, UIUC College of Engineering alumnus, awarded 2011
- Alison Krauss, musician, awarded 2024
- Jim Lovell, astronaut, awarded 2012
- Mary Ann McMorrow, Illinois Supreme Court Chief Justice, awarded 2007
- Albert Cardinal Meyer, awarded 1965
- Nathan M. Newmark, structural engineer, awarded 1965
- William A. Patterson, President of United Airlines 1934–1966, awarded 1965
- Walter Payton, football player, awarded 1987
- Ronald Reagan, United States President, awarded 1981
- Ludwig Mies van der Rohe, architect, awarded 1966
- Ryne Sandberg, baseball player for the Chicago Cubs, awarded 2017
- Paul Simon, United States Senator, awarded 1998
- Archbishop Fulton J. Sheen, Illinois religious leader, awarded 1977
- Mavis Staples, singer, actress, and civil rights activist, awarded 2021
- Adlai Ewing Stevenson II, politician, 31st Governor of Illinois, awarded 1965
- Scott Turow, author, awarded 2000
- Studs Terkel, author, awarded 2004
- Louise Taper, historian, awarded 2009
- Jesse White, 37th Secretary of State for Illinois, awarded 2026

== Student Laureate Award ==
The Lincoln Academy also presents the Abraham Lincoln Civic Engagement award to one graduating senior from each four-year college or university in the state, as well as one student from a community college. Each student, nominated by his/her respective institution, is named a Student Laureate and receives the Lincoln Medal, a certificate of merit, and a civic engagement monetary award. Student Laureates are chosen by the chief executive officers of their respective institutions, who also serve as Academic Trustees of The Lincoln Academy of Illinois. Student Laureates are honored for their overall excellence in curricular and extracurricular activities. The ceremony is held in the Old State Capitol, and is followed by a luncheon with the Governor at the Executive Mansion.
