= George St. Leger Grenfell =

British mercenary in the Confederate Army

George St. Leger Grenfell (May 30, 1808 – March 1868?) was a British mercenary, of the Cornish family, who claimed to have fought in Algeria, in Morocco against the Barbary pirates, under Garibaldi in South America, in the Crimean War, and in the Sepoy Mutiny. Immigrating to the United States, he fought for the Confederacy during the American Civil War, and was a leader of a notorious plot to seize control of parts of the Northern U.S.

== Biography ==
Grenfell was born in London, England. He came to America in 1862 and became an officer in the Confederate States Army, serving with cavalryman John Hunt Morgan, General Braxton Bragg, and General J.E.B. Stuart. He resigned from the Confederate Army in 1864 to join a plot to take over the governments of Ohio, Indiana, and Illinois and establish a Northwestern Confederacy. When the plan to take over Chicago was discovered, Grenfell and some 150 others were arrested. In what became known as the "Chicago Conspiracy", Grenfell was tried, convicted, and sentenced to hang. Through the efforts of the British Minister in Washington, his sentence was commuted to life imprisonment by President Andrew Johnson at the isolated Fort Jefferson military prison located about 70 miles west of Key West, Florida, in the Dry Tortugas islands of the Gulf of Mexico. He arrived at Fort Jefferson on October 8, 1865.

The great majority of the 527 prisoners at Fort Jefferson when Grenfell arrived were Union Army privates whose most common transgression was desertion. A number of civilians were also being held, most for robbery. Grenfell was in a special category called "state prisoner."

There were only four other state prisoners at Fort Jefferson: Dr. Samuel A. Mudd, Edmund Spangler, Samuel Arnold, and Michael O'Laughlen, all of whom had arrived at Fort Jefferson just two and a half months earlier after being convicted at the Lincoln assassination conspiracy trial.

Unfortunately for Grenfell, Dr. Mudd had attempted to escape a few days before Grenfell arrived. Fearing a larger escape attempt of the state prisoners, the five men were confined together for the next three months in a ground level cell known as the "dungeon." In a letter Dr. Mudd wrote at the time to his brother-in-law Jere Dyer, he said:

We are all at this moment in chains. Neither Colonel Grenfel nor myself has been taken out to work the past two or three days, but suffered to remain passively in our quarters. He is quite an intelligent man, tall, straight, and about sixty-one or two years of age. He speaks fluently several languages, and often adds mirth by his witty sarcasm and jest. He has been badly wounded and is now suffering with dropsy, and is allowed no medical treatment whatever, but loaded down with chains, and fed upon the most loathsome food, which treatment in a short time must bring him to an untimely grave. You will confer an act of kindness and mercy by acquainting the English Minister at Washington, Sir F.A. Bruce, of these facts.

In an April 16, 1867, letter to Tom Dyer, his wife's brother in New Orleans, Dr. Mudd again wrote of Grenfell:

Colonel St. Ledger Grenfel is kept in close confinement under guard. A few days ago, being sick, he applied to the doctor of the Post for medical attention, which he was refused, and he was ordered to work. Feeling himself unable to move about, he refused. He was then ordered to carry a ball until further orders, which he likewise refused. He was then tied up for half a day, and still refusing, he was taken to one of the wharves, thrown overboard with a rope attached, and ducked; being able to keep himself above water, a fifty pound weight was attached to his feet. Grenfel is an old man, about sixty. He has never refused to do work which he was able to perform, but they demanded more than he felt able, and he wisely refused. They could not conquer him, and he is doing now that which he never objected doing.

In a 1926 Saturday Evening Post article, author George Allan England provided a description of Colonel Grenfell, as told to him by a former Fort Jefferson lighthouse keeper:

All sorts and conditions were herded into the prison of Dry Tortugas. The greatest mystery man of them all was a fiery swashbuckler known as Col. St. Leger Grenfell. 'He was a queer bird altogether,' one William Felton told me at Key West. Felton was long a custodian at the fort, and can rock on his front porch and spin yarns about it by the hour. 'Grenfell was sure one tough lookin' customer, six foot tall, black-haired, an' with black eyes under big, bushy eyebrows. He had a tremendous black beard, too, an' wore a red flannel shirt open at the neck, an' his pant legs tucked in high boots. Folks said he was a son of Sir Roger Grenfell, an earl, or somethin' swell like that.'

Colonel Grenfell was afflicted with yellow fever during the height of an epidemic in September 1867. In letters to his wife, Dr. Mudd wrote "Colonel Grenfel is quite sick with the disease; he was taken yesterday. I will do all that is possible to save him." And, "Colonel Grenfel is quite sick; his case is doubtful." But in the end, Dr. Mudd was able to save his life and Colonel Grenfell recovered.

Dr. Mudd's final mention of Colonel Grenfell is in an April 14, 1868, letter to his wife. In it he says "We have heard nothing from Grenfel since he escaped on the 6th of last month. All hands may have perished, it being quite stormy at the time."

Colonel Grenfell, a highly experienced sailor, and three others had escaped from Fort Jefferson in a small boat. The military report of the escape said:

... Private William Noreil of Company I 5th US Arty who had been on duty posted as a sentinel over the boats within the boom, did between the hours of 11 o'clock P.M. and 1 A.M. desert his post, taking possession of a small boat and carrying with him the following named prisoners – G. St. Leger Grenfell, J.W. Adare, James Orr and Joseph Holroya. I am impressed with the belief that Grenfell had considerable money in his possession by and through which he bribed the sentinel. The surveying steamer Bibb which was lying in the harbor was dispatched in pursuit of them about 8 o'clock the same morning but after cruising the whole day failed either to overhaul or hear anything concerning them.

Most assumed that Grenfell and the others perished at sea, but there were persistent rumors he had survived. On June 5, 1868, the following announcement, originally published in the Mobile, Alabama, Advertiser, appeared in the New York Times.

St. Leger Grenfell – The public was greatly gratified not long since to learn that this gallant English soldier had escaped his prison at the Dry Tortugas, and in his love of liberty at the risk of life, he had trusted himself to the mercies of a frail boat in an attempt to cross the Florida Straits to Cuba. We have the pleasure of stating that his voyage was made in safety, and that a letter has been received from him in Havana, sending his thanks and acknowledgements for kind treatment to some of the army officers at Tortugas, and stating that he was just about to sail for Old England. We do not doubt that every gentleman officer belonging to the garrison of his prison guard rejoices at his escape.

Most historians believe that notices such as this about Grenfell were fabrications. All that is known for sure is that Grenfell was never heard from again.
