= The Prisoner of Shark Island =

1936 film by John Ford

- film poster by Joseph A. Maturo
- Directed by: John Ford
- Written by: Nunnally Johnson
- Produced by: Nunnally Johnson; Darryl F. Zanuck
- Starring: Warner Baxter; Gloria Stuart; Frank McGlynn; Francis McDonald
- Cinematography: Bert Glennon
- Edited by: Jack Murray
- Music by: R.H. Bassett; Hugo Friedhofer
- Production company: Twentieth Century Fox
- Distributed by: Twentieth Century Fox
- Release date: February 28, 1936
- Running time: 96 minutes
- Country: United States
- Language: English

The Prisoner of Shark Island is a 1936 American drama film that presents a dramatized life of Maryland physician Samuel Mudd who treated the injured presidential assassin John Wilkes Booth and later spent time in prison after his unanimous conviction for being one of Booth's accomplices. The film was produced by Darryl F. Zanuck, was directed by John Ford and starred Warner Baxter and Gloria Stuart.

Twentieth Century Pictures, before it merged with Fox, purchased the rights to the book The Life of Dr. Mudd by Nettie Mudd Monroe, the doctor's daughter. The film's credits, however, make no reference to Monroe or her book. Modern sources state that Darryl F. Zanuck, Twentieth Century's vice-president in charge of production, got the idea to make the film after he read an article in Time magazine about the prison camp for political prisoners on the Dry Tortugas island.

== Plot ==
A few hours after the assassination of President Abraham Lincoln, Dr. Samuel Mudd gives treatment to a man with a broken leg who shows up at his door. Mudd does not know that the president has been assassinated, and also does not know the man he is treating is Lincoln's assassin, John Wilkes Booth. Mudd splints the broken leg and receives a banknote as payment, only later realizing that it is a $50 bill.

Mudd is soon afterward arrested for being an accessory in the assassination, is convicted, and is then sent to Arcadia, a prison on the Dry Tortugas that is referred to in the film as "America's own Devil's Island".

Mudd's wife hatches an escape plan using "Buck", the black prison guard who tends to Mudd. Mudd escapes his cell, hears Sgt. Rankin's instruction to kill him on sight, and gets to the prison's outer wall above the shark-infested moat before an alarm is sounded. Mudd then swims to a waiting boat where his wife and her father (Mr. Holt) help him. However, Sgt. Rankin boards the boat, recaptures Mudd and returns him to the prison, where he is confined to a windowless, underground cell along with "Buck".

The island has been in the grip of a yellow fever epidemic, with the official prison doctor having fallen ill with the same fever. The Commandant has few options and places Mudd in charge of addressing the outbreak. Now with the cooperation of the soldier guards, Mudd introduces ventilation into the hospital ward by smashing the windows and letting in a storm which relieves the men's suffering by cooling the air and “blowing all the mosquitoes away.” (The references to the mosquitoes speaks to most, if not all, of the film's audience, who would know that yellow fever is carried by mosquitoes.) The yellow fever epidemic subsides and Mudd ironically saves the life of Sgt. Rankin, but not before Mudd also catches the fever. The soldiers sign a petition to have Mudd pardoned and he is ultimately released.

== Cast ==
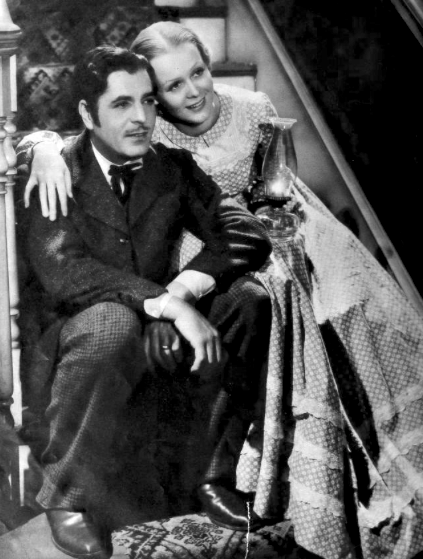
Warner Baxter and Gloria Stuart in The Prisoner of Shark Island

- Warner Baxter as Dr. Samuel Alexander Mudd
- Gloria Stuart as Mrs. Peggy Mudd
- Claude Gillingwater as Col. Jeremiah Milford Dyer
- Arthur Byron as Mr. Erickson
- O.P. Heggie as Dr. MacIntyre
- Harry Carey as Commandant of Fort Jefferson
- Francis Ford as Cpl. O'Toole
- John McGuire as Lt. Lovett
- Francis McDonald as John Wilkes Booth
- Douglas Wood as Gen. Ewing
- John Carradine as Sgt. Rankin
- Joyce Kay as Martha Mudd
- Fred Kohler Jr. as Sgt. Cooper
- Ernest Whitman as 'Buck' Milford
- Paul Fix as David Herold
- Frank Shannon as Joseph Holt
- Frank McGlynn Sr. as President Abraham Lincoln
- Leila McIntyre as Mary Todd Lincoln
- Etta McDaniel as Aunt Rosabelle Milford
- J.M. Kerrigan as Judge Maiben
- Arthur Loft as Frank J. Thomas - Carpetbagger
- Paul McVey as Gen. David Hunter
- Maurice Murphy as Prison Hospital Orderly
- Beulah Hall Jones as Blanche (uncredited)
- Jack Pennick as Corporal (uncredited)
- Robert Homans as Sergeant (uncredited)
- Murdock MacQuarrie as Edman Spangler (uncredited)
- Cyril Thorton as Michael O'Laughlen (uncredited)
- Cecil Weston as Mary Surratt (uncredited)
- Lloyd Whitlock as Henry Rathbone (uncredited)

== Critical response ==
A contemporary review by Frank Nugent in The New York Times reported that the film presents Mudd's story "with commendable directness," noting "Warner Baxter's entirely convincing portrayal of Dr. Mudd" but also claiming that the film "is scarcely more than a well-fabricated edition of the Dreyfus-Devil's Island series that has become part of the screen's tradition." Variety reported that "Warner Baxter [...] turns in a capital performance as the titular prisoner of ‘America’s Devil’s Island’", and described the casting as "tiptop", with "John Carradine stand[ing] out as a new face among especially sinister heavies." Writing in Turner Classic Movies, critic Jeremy Arnold described the film as a "highly entertaining, fast-moving film with endlessly fascinating subject matter," being "one of director John Ford's less-talked-about pictures" and noting that "John Carradine [...] is deliciously evil and nasty in one of the most memorable performances of his career [and] Warner Baxter as Mudd gives perhaps THE best performance of his own career."
