= Fort Jefferson =

- Fort Jefferson National Monument
- U.S. National Register of Historic Places
- U.S. Historic district
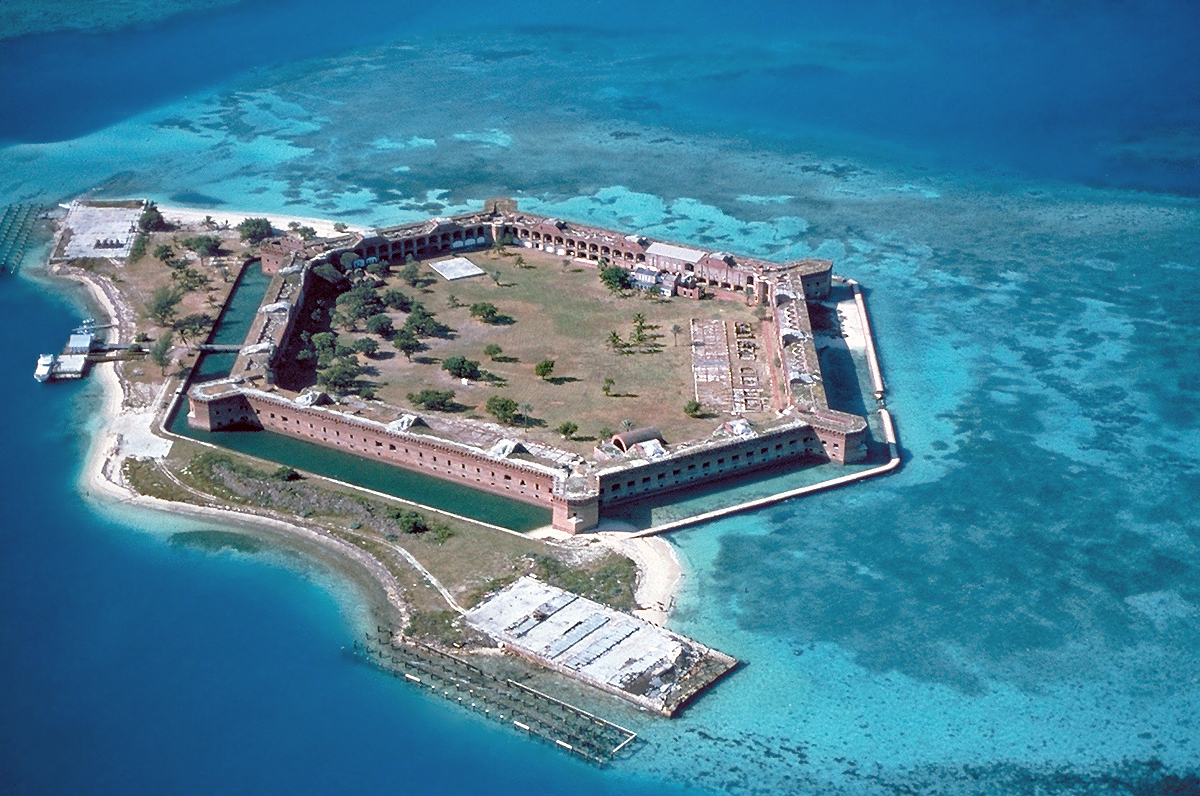
- Aerial view of Garden Key and Fort Jefferson
- Interactive map outlining the fort
- Location: Dry Tortugas, Florida, 68 miles (109 km) west of Key West in the Gulf of Mexico
- Area: 47.125 acres (19.071 ha)
- Built: 1847
- NRHP reference No.: 70000069
- Added to NRHP: November 10, 1970

Fort Jefferson Prison
- Part of American Civil War prison camps
- Dry Tortugas, Florida, U.S.

Site information
- Type: Union Prison Camp
- Owner: U.S. Government
- Controlled by: Union Army

Site history
- Built: 1861
- In use: September 1861 – April 1, 1869
- Battles/wars: American Civil War

Garrison information
- Past commanders: Colonel Bill Wilson
- Occupants: Union soldiers, Confederate prisoners of war, civilians

Fort Jefferson is a former U.S. military coastal fortress in the Dry Tortugas National Park of Florida. It is the largest brick masonry structure in the Americas, covering 16 acres (6.5 ha) and constructed of over 16 million bricks. Among United States forts, only Fort Monroe in Virginia and Fort Adams in Rhode Island are larger. The fort is located on Garden Key in the lower Florida Keys within the Dry Tortugas, 68 miles (109 km) west of the island of Key West. The Dry Tortugas are part of Monroe County in Florida.

The fort was named for the Founding Father and American president Thomas Jefferson.

== History ==
=== Construction ===
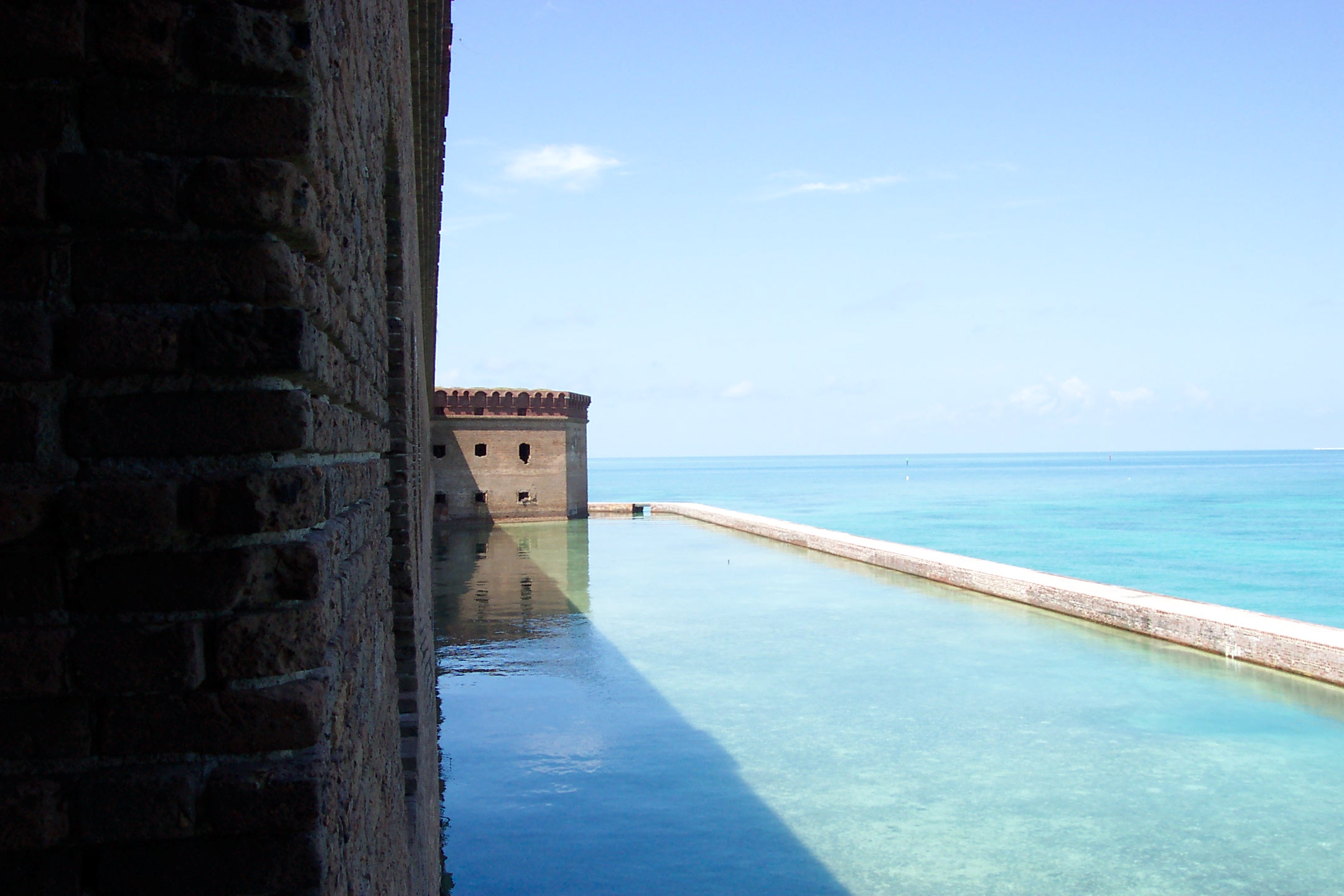
A view of the moat surrounding the perimeter of Fort Jefferson.

In late December 1824 and early January 1825, about five years after Florida joined the United States, U.S. Navy Commodore David Porter inspected the Dry Tortugas islands. He was on the lookout for a site to build a naval station that would help suppress piracy in the Caribbean. Unimpressed with what he saw, he notified the Secretary of the Navy that the Dry Tortugas were unfit for any kind of naval establishment. He reported that they consisted of small sand islands a little above the surface of the ocean, had no fresh water, scarcely enough land to place a fortification, and in any case were probably not solid enough to bear one.

While Commodore Porter thought the Dry Tortugas were unfit for a naval station, others in the U.S. government thought the islands were a good location for a lighthouse to guide ships around the area's reefs and small islands. A small island called Bush Key, later called Garden Key, was selected as the site for the lighthouse, which became known as Garden Key Light. Construction began in 1825 and was completed in 1826. The 65-foot (20 m) lighthouse was constructed of brick with a whitewashed exterior. A small white cottage for the lighthouse keeper was constructed beside the lighthouse.

In 1829, under recommendations from Commodore John Rodgers, the survey ship Florida stopped at the Dry Tortugas to evaluate the anchorage. Contrary to Commodore Porter's experience, Josiah Tattnall III was delighted with what he found. The Dry Tortugas, he reported, consisted of 11 small keys and surrounding reefs and banks, over which the sea broke. There was an outer and an inner harbor. The former afforded a safe anchorage during all seasons and was large enough to let a large number of ships ride at anchor. Of more importance, the inner harbor combined a sufficient depth of water for ships-of-the-line, with a narrow entrance of not more than 120 yards (110 m). Tattnall noted that if a hostile power should occupy the Dry Tortugas, United States shipping in the Gulf would be in deadly peril, and nothing but absolute naval superiority could prevail. However, if occupied and fortified by the U.S., the Dry Tortugas would constitute the advance post for a defense of the Gulf Coast. Robert E. Lee, then a Captain in the U.S. army, shared this opinion and in February 1845 penned a letter to Thomas Blake (Commissioner of the General Land Office) recommending the reservation of the Dry Tortugas for military use. Capt. John G. Barnard then made a detailed reconnaissance in November 1844 and on 17 September 1845, the Dry Tortugas became a national military reservation.

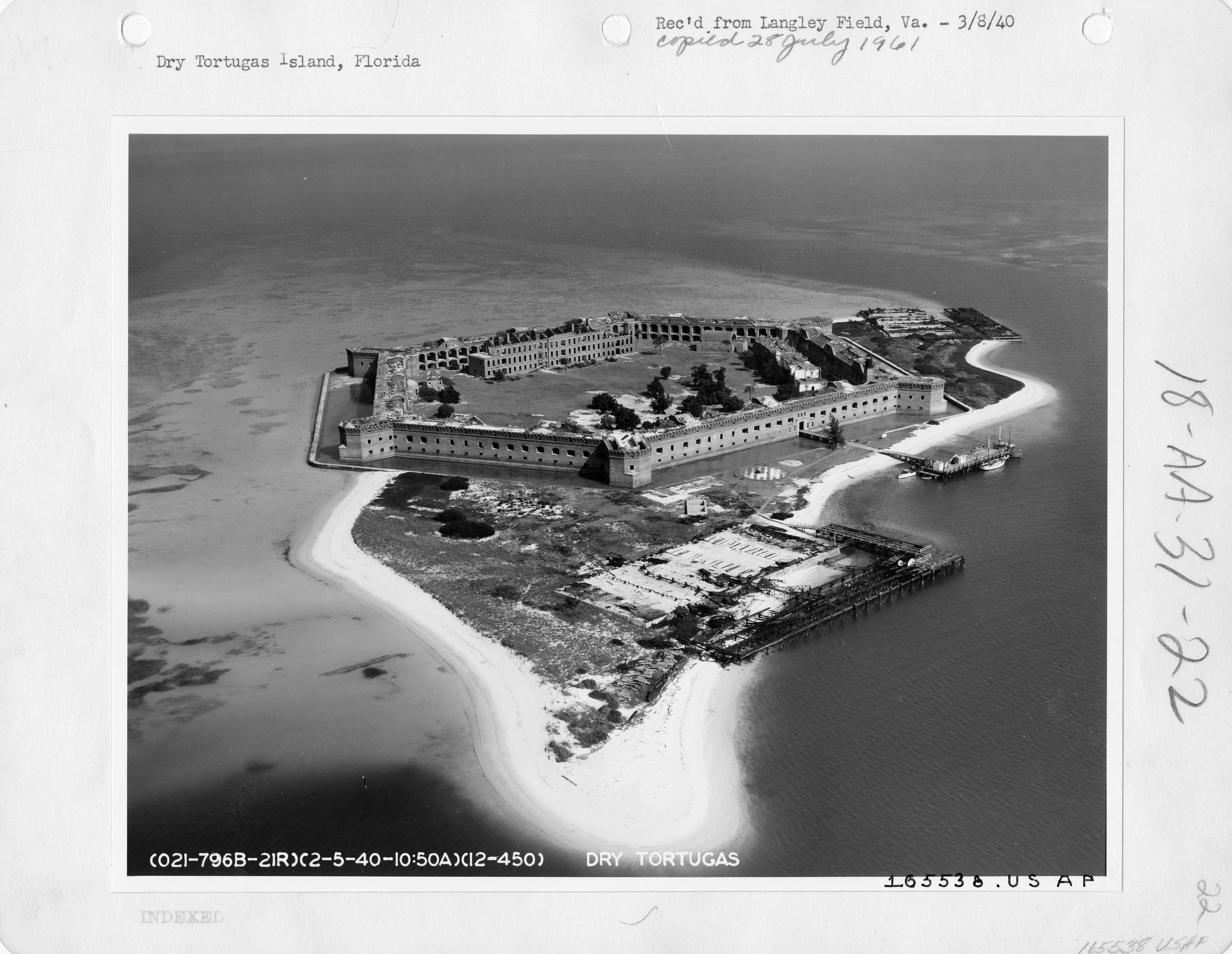
An aerial view of Fort Jefferson in 1940.

Construction of Fort Jefferson (named after the third U.S. President, Thomas Jefferson) began on Garden Key in December 1846, under the supervision of 2nd Lt. Horatio Wright, after plans drawn up by Lt. Montgomery C. Meigs were approved in November. Meigs' plans were based on a design by Joseph Totten. Chief of Engineers Totten eventually visited the fort in 1855, accompanying Louis Agassiz. Work was half complete in 1860. Workers consisted mostly of enslaved people hired from their owners in Key West and other parts of the State of Florida. Some White laborers, mostly Irish immigrants were also employed. The use of enslaved labor was discontinued in 1863.

The new fort was built so that the existing Garden Key lighthouse and the lighthouse keeper's cottage were contained within the walls of the fort. The lighthouse continued to serve a vital function in guiding ships through the waters of the Dry Tortugas Islands until the current metal light tower was installed atop an adjacent wall of the fort in 1876. The original brick lighthouse tower was taken down in 1877.

=== Design ===
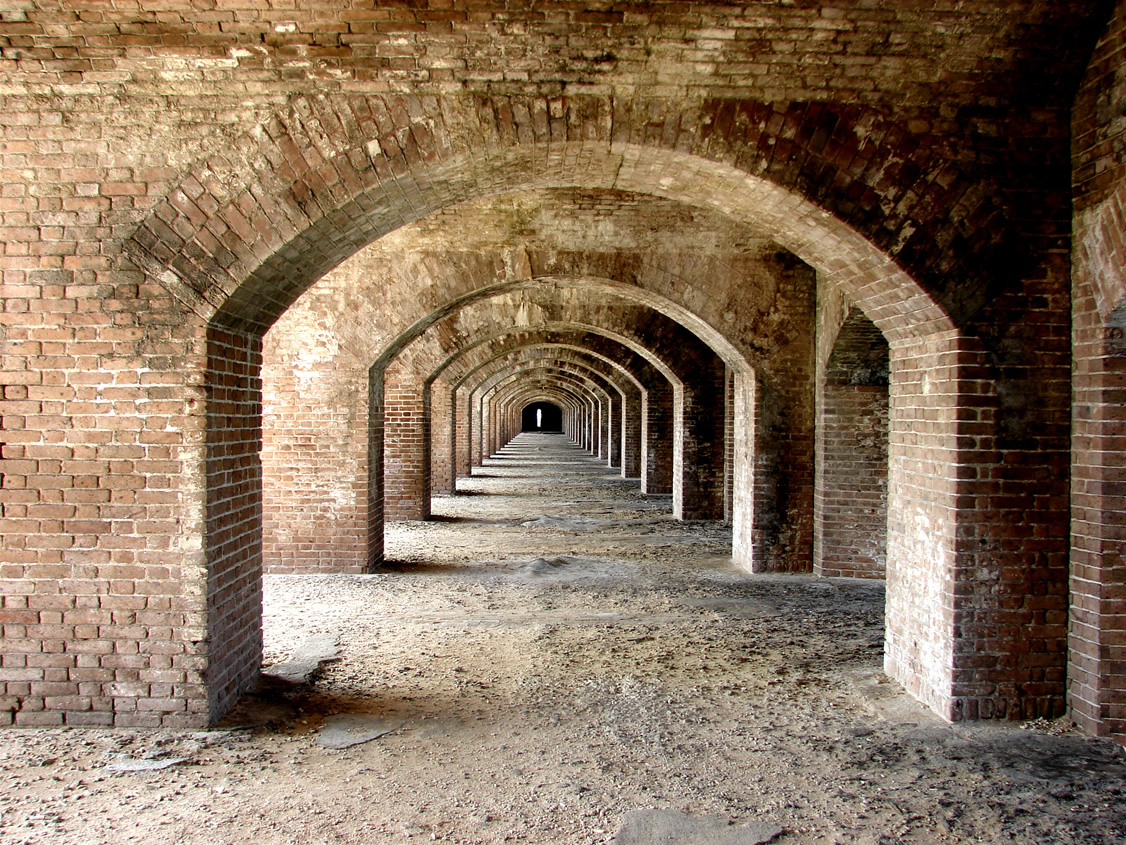
Lower archways of one interior side of Fort Jefferson. Many of the arches were designed by Capt. Daniel P. Woodbury, Superintending Engineer from 1856 to 1860.

The design called for a two-tiered casemates in a six-sided outline, with two curtain walls measuring 325 feet (99 m), and the other four measuring 477 feet (145 m). Corner bastions, which are large projections designed to allow defensive fire along the faces of the walls they joined, contained gunrooms, gunpowder magazines and a granite spiral staircase. Each tier of casemates contained 150 guns, and another 150 were placed on top of the fort itself. The heavy guns were mounted inside the walls in a string of open casemates, or gunrooms, facing outward toward the sea through large openings called embrasures. The 13-acre (5.3 ha) parade ground contained additional powder magazines, headquarters, a hospital, officer quarters and three large barracks.

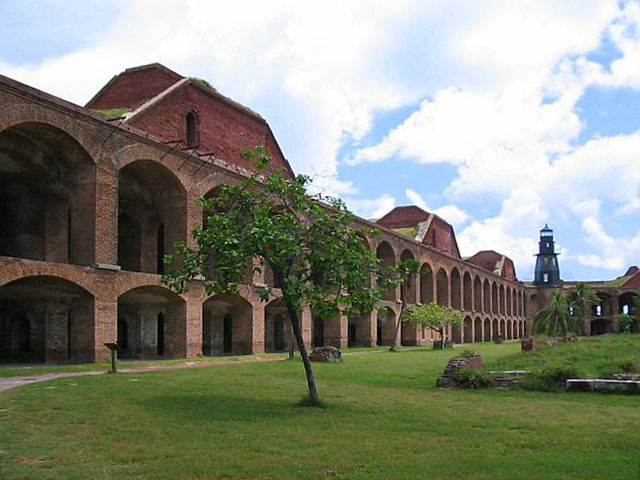
A view of the interior wall, harbor light, and parade grounds of Fort Jefferson.

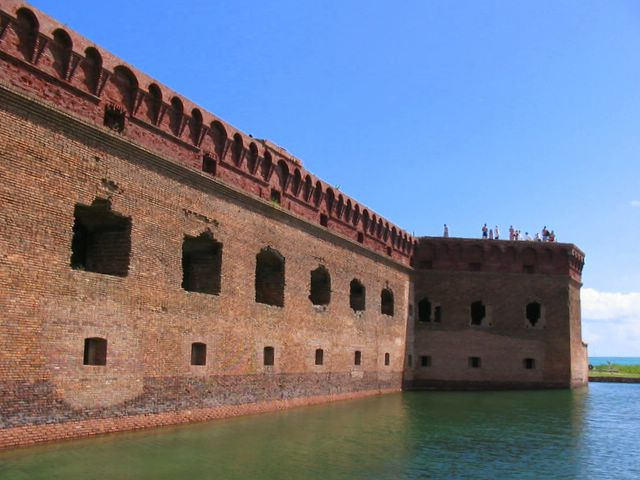
Ramparts on the north wall of Fort Jefferson, showing evidence of subsidence (i.e., sinking) in 2005.

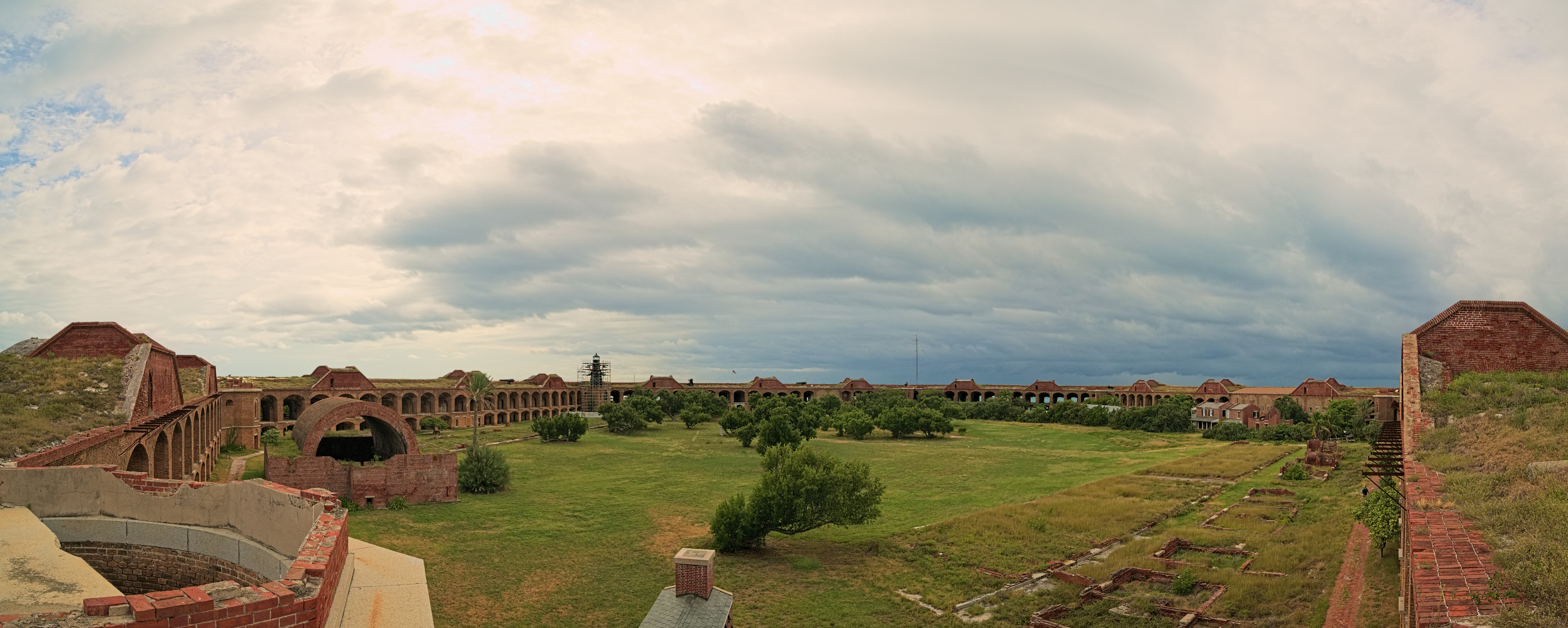
The courtyard of Fort Jefferson, showing the expanse of the interior.

The Army employed civilian carpenters, masons, general laborers, and Key West slaves to help construct the fort. By August 1855, 233 White contract laborers were employed, though the slaves "... were the backbone of the labor gang ...," according to Albert Manucy. Bricks were provided by the Pensacola firm of Raiford and Abercrombie. In 1859, the scientist Joseph Bassett Holder assumed responsibility as the fort's physician.

In order to support such a large population in an area lacking fresh water, an innovative system of cisterns was built into the walls of the fort. Sand-filled columns were placed at regular intervals in the inner walls, spanning their height from the roof to the foundation. The columns were intended to filter rainwater from the rooftop for long-term storage in a series of underground chambers. However, the rainwater dissolved salts in the sand, or the cisterns had not been made tight, making the water unfit for drinking, but usable for washing and cooking. Only the rainwater runoff stored under the parade ground was fresh for drinking. Two steam condensers distilled 7,000 US gallons (26,000 L) of sea water per day during the Civil War. The fort enjoyed "... much better water than we have had heretofore," which was stored in the parade ground cisterns.

=== Civil War ===
At the onset of the Civil War, 62 men of the Second U.S. Artillery Regiment, under the command of Major Lewis Golding Arnold, were moved to the fort, preventing it from falling into the hands of rebel forces. Capt. Meigs took over as the Superintending Engineer in 1860, and worked feverishly to improve the security and defenses so that the fort's heavy guns were first fired on 26 January 1861. The fort had a population of 168 persons at the time, including women and children.

Two companies, 160 soldiers, of the 6th New York Zouaves arrived on 4 July 1861, under the command of Col. Bill Wilson. The 7th New Hampshire Volunteer Infantry arrived in March 1862, under the command of Col. Haldimand S. Putnam, to relieve the Zouaves. The 90th New York Volunteer Infantry Regiment, under the command of Lt. Col. Louis W. Tinelli relieved the New Hampshire soldiers in June 1862. They were relieved by the 47th Pennsylvania Infantry Regiment in December 1862. They were relieved in March 1864 by the 110th New York Volunteer Infantry.

In September 1861, the first prisoner soldiers appeared, those sentenced by courts-martial to confinement and hard labor for acts such as mutinous conduct. President Lincoln then substituted imprisonment on the Dry Tortugas, in lieu of execution, for those found guilty of desertion. By June 1863, only 22 Black workers remained following the Emancipation Proclamation. By November 1863, the number of military convicts reached 214, meeting the demands for unskilled labor, and the ratio of soldier to prisoners was about four to one. In June 1864, the ratio was almost equal, with 653 soldiers and 753 convicts. In November 1864, only 583 soldiers guarded 882 prisoners and eight were able to escape.

=== Post-Civil War ===
Samuel Mudd as he appeared as a federal prisoner while working in the carpenter's shop in the military prison at Fort Jefferson, circa 1866–1867.

On 24 July 1865 four special civilian prisoners arrived. These were Samuel Mudd, Edman Spangler, Samuel Arnold and Michael O'Laughlen, who had been convicted of conspiracy in the assassination of President Abraham Lincoln. Mudd attempted to stowaway on a steam transport, when the 82nd U.S. Colored Troops relieved the 161st New York Volunteer Infantry Regiment on 25 September 1865. This led to his detention in the fort's "dungeon," over which were the words "Whoso entereth here leaveth all hope behind" (from Canto III of Dante's Inferno). Another state prisoner, Col. George St. Leger Grenfell arrived on 8 October 1865.

In November 1865, the 5th U.S. Artillery arrived and in December 1865, there were a total of 470 soldiers and 273 prisoners. By February 1866, the prisoners were reduced to 207, and to 193 by May. Construction came to a near halt that summer and only 56 prisoners remained in January 1867. The 3rd U.S. Artillery replaced the 5th in 1869.

Mudd helped provide medical care during a yellow fever epidemic at the fort in 1867. The epidemic killed many prisoners, including O'Laughlen, and Joseph Sim Smith, the 5th Artillery's surgeon. A monument to Smith and his son is still present on the parade grounds. Mudd, Arnold and Spangler were pardoned by President Andrew Johnson and released.

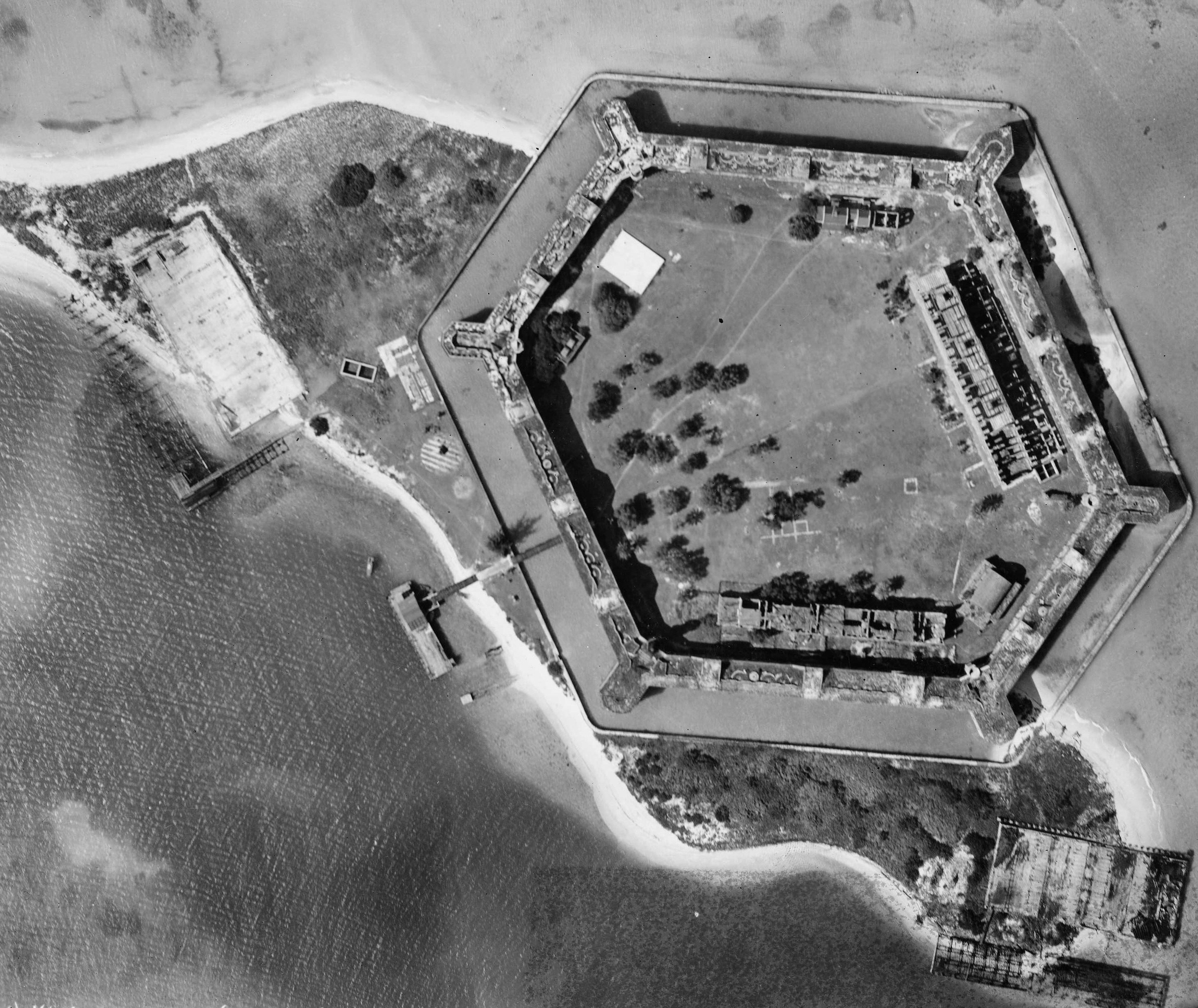
Additional aerial view of Fort Jefferson in the 1940s.

The seawall was finally completed in 1872 and six 15-inch (38 cm) Rodman guns were in place on barbette (third) tier. The total number of large-caliber guns was 243. The guns were never fired.

Frequent hurricanes and yellow fever epidemics convinced the War Department to remove the garrison, leaving a small caretaker force for the armaments and ammunition in 1874. In 1889, the Army turned the fort over to the Marine Hospital Service to be operated as a quarantine station. The U.S. Navy used the Key as a coaling station.

Neglected, stripped by vandals, swept by repeated tropical storms that crushed brick and concrete and bent girders, Fort Jefferson deteriorated rapidly. It remained unoccupied until the Spanish–American War broke out in 1898. The American fleet was stationed there. One of the ships to load coal there was the USS Maine before her fateful trip to Havana.

In 1902, the property was transferred to the Navy Department, and coal rigs and water distilling plants were built. When these were destroyed by hurricanes in 1906, the fort was again abandoned. Two years later the entire group of islands was set aside as a federal bird reservation. Until 1934 Garden Key and the crumbling ruins were merely a rendezvous for fishermen and tourists.

During World War I, the lighthouse was decommissioned, but a wireless station and naval seaplane facility was operational.

=== Park designation ===
On January 4, 1935, President Franklin D. Roosevelt, designated the area as Fort Jefferson National Monument. Between 1935 and 1938 the Works Progress Administration performed structural renovation and historic preservation work on site. It was listed on the National Register of Historic Places on November 10, 1970. On October 26, 1992, the Dry Tortugas, including Fort Jefferson, was established as a National Park.

== Accessibility ==
Fort Jefferson can be reached by a daily ferry from Key West, as well as by chartered seaplane and private boat. As a national park, primitive camping is permitted on the beach. The fort also features a museum and bookstore.

== See also ==
- Dry Tortugas Ferry to Fort Jefferson
- Dry Tortugas Light
- Jack Tier
