= Edmund Spangler =

Stagehand at Ford's Theatre

Edman Spangler
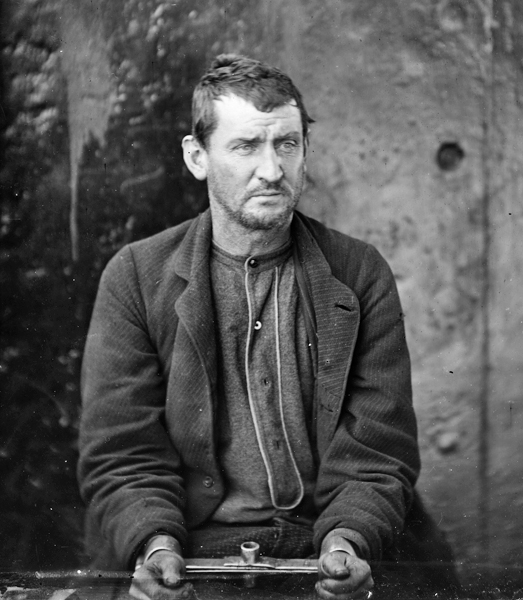
- Edman Spangler, manacled, after his arrest, 1865
- Born: August 10, 1825; York, Pennsylvania, U.S.
- Died: February 7, 1875 (aged 49); Waldorf, Maryland, U.S.
- Resting place: Saint Peters Cemetery
- Other names: Ned Spangler; Edward Spangler; Edman Spangler
- Occupations: Carpenter, stagehand
- Known for: Involvement in the assassination of Abraham Lincoln
- Spouse: Mary Brasheare (m. 1858; died 1864)
- Status: Pardoned in March 1869
- Conviction: Aiding and abetting the escape of John Wilkes Booth
- Penalty: 6 years imprisonment with hard labor
- Accomplice: John Wilkes Booth

Details
- Date apprehended: April 17, 1865
- Imprisoned at: Fort Jefferson, Florida

Edman "Ned" Spangler (August 10, 1825 – February 7, 1875), baptized Edmund Spangler, was an American carpenter and stagehand who was employed at Ford's Theatre at the time of President Abraham Lincoln's murder on April 14, 1865. He and seven others were charged in conspiring to assassinate Lincoln and three other high level government officials. Spangler was the only one found not guilty of the conspiracy charge. Even so, he was found guilty of helping Lincoln's assassin, John Wilkes Booth, escape and sentenced to six years of hard labor.

== Background ==
Spangler was born in York, Pennsylvania, one of four sons of William Spangler, a county sheriff. Spangler's mother died when he was an infant. He was baptized as "Edmund Spangler" at the First Reformed Church in York on August 10, 1825. Throughout his life, Spangler went by several names; as an adult, friends and co-workers knew him as "Ned", after his arrest, he signed his statement as "Edman Spangler" while family records name him "Edmund/Edward".

While in his early 20s, Spangler trained as a carpenter. He eventually moved to Maryland and began working with another carpenter, James Johnson Gifford. In the early 1850s, Spangler and Gifford helped to construct Tudor Hall, the summer retreat for the Booth family. It was during this time that Spangler met future stage actor John Wilkes Booth who was then a child. In 1853, Spangler moved to Baltimore where he worked as an assistant to Gifford at the Front Street and Holliday Street Theaters. In 1858, Spangler married Mary Brasheare. In 1861, the couple relocated to Washington, D.C., where Spangler began working as a carpenter and scene shifter at Ford's Theatre. It was while working at Ford's Theatre that Spangler became reacquainted with John Wilkes Booth. By that time, Booth had become a renowned and popular stage actor. Spangler was dazzled by Booth's fame and charm and, despite the fact that Booth was thirteen years Spangler's junior, was always eager to complete whatever tasks Booth assigned him. Like Booth, Spangler opposed the abolition of slavery and considered himself a Secessionist. He would often butt heads with co-worker Jake Rittersbach who was a veteran of the Union Army.

After Spangler's wife died in 1864, he began drinking very heavily. Although he became disagreeable after drinking too much, friends described him as a generally congenial and endearing "drudge" when sober and noted his love for practical jokes, children, and animals.

== Assassination ==
On April 2, 1865 Richmond, the Confederate capital, fell to Union forces. On April 9 General Lee's Northern Virginia army surrendered to the Union Forces. These two events were evidence that after four long years the civil war was finally nearing its end even though there were still Confederate forces in the field throughout the South though clearly not enough to bring about a Confederate victory.

Five days later President Lincoln and his wife Mary attended a performance of Our American Cousin at Ford's Theater. During that afternoon Spangler was asked by his employer, Harry Clay Ford, to help prepare the State Box for the President's anticipated attendance that evening. He helped bring in furniture and remove the partition which converted the two boxes, numbers 7 and 8, into a single box. Later Booth showed up at the theater and invited Spangler and other stagehands of Ford's out for a drink. Booth indicated to the employees that he might come back for the evening's performance.

At about 9:30 pm, Booth again appeared at the theatre. He dismounted in the alley to the rear of Ford's and asked for Spangler. When Spangler came out, Booth asked him to hold the mare he was riding, which he had hired from the stables of James W. Pumphrey. Pumphrey had warned Booth that the horse was high spirited and she would break her halter if left unattended. Spangler explained he had work to do and asked Joseph Burroughs, another Ford's employee, to do so. Burroughs, whose nickname was "Peanut John" (or "Johnny Peanut"), agreed to hold the horse. At about 10:15 PM John Wilkes Booth entered the president's box and assassinated Lincoln and then quickly escaped from the theater.

== Arrest, trial, and conviction ==
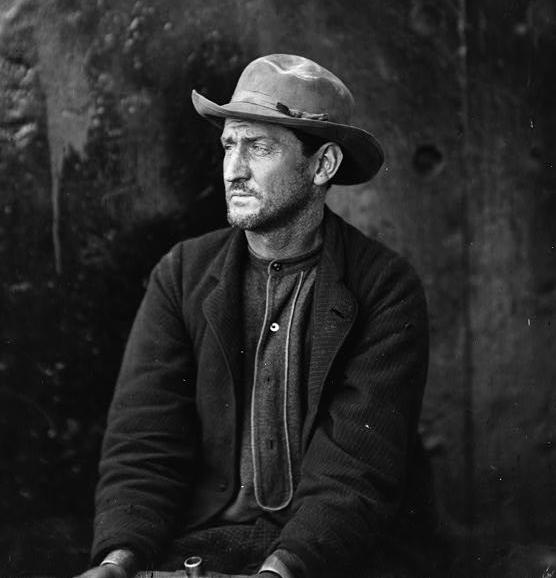
Edmund Spangler

It did not take long for military investigators to unravel the plot not only to assassinate the president but also Secretary of State William H. Seward, Vice President Andrew Johnson and General Ulysses S. Grant. The Union believed this an act of war orchestrated by the Confederate government in a desperate attempt to continue the war. Seen as an act of war the Union government would try those they felt responsible in a military trial rather than a civil trial.

Spangler was questioned on April 15, 1865, and released. He was arrested on April 17 and booked as an accomplice to John Wilkes Booth.

Within a month of the assassination eight individuals including Spangler had been apprehended and sat in a military courtroom charged with conspiring to "kill and murder" President Lincoln and the three above named high level government officials. The act was done "maliciously, unlawfully, and traitorously, and in aid of the existing armed rebellion against the United States of America".

The military trial began May 9 and lasted until June 30. Nine military officers were selected by the prosecution to serve on the commission. The officers served as both judge and jury. During the civil war since the officers of most military trials had no legal training the prosecutors were allowed in the deliberation room as legal advisers. A sense of the War department's attitude towards the defendants and the purpose of a military trial can be gleaned by the following three quotes.

Secretary of the Navy Gideon Welles wrote in his diary the day the trial started, "The trial of the assassins is not so promptly carried into effect as (Secretary of War) Stanton declared it should be. He said it was his intention the criminals should be tried and executed before President Lincoln was buried". One of the commissioners, Brigadier General August V. Kautz wrote, "The Judge Advocates, under the influence of the Secretary of War, evidently, were very persevering and wanted evidently to have the seven [eight] prisoners all hung." During his closing argument for the prosecution, Assistant Judge Advocate John Bingham stated,

Who will dare to say in time of civil war "no person shall be deprived of life, liberty, and property, without due process of law?" This is a provision of your Constitution than which there is none more just or sacred in it; it is, however, only the law of peace, not of war. In peace, that wise provision of the Constitution must be, and is, enforced by civil courts; in war, it must be, and is, to a great extent, inoperative and disregarded".

Along with the general charge of conspiracy, each of the defendants were charged with the specific role they were accused of playing. Spangler was accused of aiding and assisting Booth into the President's box and then barring the door outside the box to prevent any help for Lincoln and then helping Booth escape.

Joseph B. Stewart, a lawyer who chased Booth across the stage, said that while pursuing Booth he saw someone at the door through which Booth escaped, from "about twenty or twenty-five feet" away. Stewart stated, "I do not undertake to swear positively that the prisoner, Edward Spangler, is the person I saw near the door; but I do say that there is no one among these prisoners who calls that man to my mind, except the man who, I am told, is Mr. Spangler; but I am decided in my opinion, that Spangler resembles the person I saw there." Stewart also testified, "The man I have spoken of stood about three feet from the door out of which Booth passed; I noticed him just after the door slammed." Five days previously orchestra leader William Withers Jr. testified, "Where I stood on the stage (at the time of Booth's escape) was not more than a yard from the door." Jacob Ritterspaugh, who worked backstage with Spangler as a scene shifter, testified that he unsuccessfully chased Booth, and then added, "When I came back, Spangler was at the same place I had left him." Ritterspaugh further testified that when he returned and informed Spangler that Booth had escaped, Spangler slapped him in the face and admonished him, "Don't say which way he went." However, another stagehand, James Lamb, stated that what Ritterspaugh had actually said was "That was Booth! I'll swear it was Booth!", at which point Spangler had slapped him and told him to shut up. Finally, John Sleichmann, a property man for the theatre, testified that when Booth had arrived he had spoken to Spangler and asked, "You'll help me all you can, won't you?", to which Spangler had agreed.

After hearing all the trial testimony for the defendants, commissioner General Lew Wallace wrote a letter to his wife Susan, dated June 26, 1865, in which he included the following comment:

The trial is not yet over but I say to myself, certainly it can't endure beyond this week, and do all I can to be patient. Judge Bingham, on the side of the government, speaks tomorrow, and the comm. votes "guilty or not guilty". I have passed a few words with my associate members, and think we can agree in a couple of hours at farthest. Three, if not four, of the eight will be acquitted—that is, they would be if we voted today. What effect Bingham will have remains to be seen.

Spangler was one of the three who the majority of the commissioners believed was not guilty.

Three days later the commissioners in deliberation with the three prosecutors found Spangler not guilty of the general charge of conspiracy, not guilty of assisting Booth into the President's box and barring help, but guilty of helping Booth escape.

Four of the eight defendants, Mary Surratt, Lewis Powell, David Herold, and George Atzerodt were sentenced to be hanged. Dr. Samuel Mudd, Samuel Arnold and Michael O'Laughlen were sentenced to life in prison while Spangler was sentenced to only six years. The four of them were imprisoned in Fort Jefferson in the Dry Tortugas off Key West, Florida. In August 1867, there was an outbreak of yellow fever at Fort Jefferson. Dr. Mudd attempted to treat those who caught the disease while Spangler assisted. Michael O'Laughlen died of yellow fever in September 1867. When Dr. Mudd caught yellow fever, Spangler treated him. Spangler also built coffins for the thirty-seven prisoners and guards who eventually succumbed to the disease.

== Post prison years and death ==
After years of petitions from Dr. Mudd's wife, Spangler's former boss John T. Ford and attorney Thomas Ewing Jr., President Andrew Johnson pardoned Spangler, Dr. Mudd and Samuel Arnold on March 1, 1869. The group traveled back to Baltimore on a steamer, arriving on April 6. Shortly after his release, the newspaper New York World published a statement by Spangler asserting his innocence and alleging mistreatment by prison staff. After arriving back home, Spangler went to work at the Holliday Street Theatre in Baltimore for his old boss John T. Ford, the former owner of Ford's Theatre where President Lincoln was shot. When the Holliday Street Theatre burned down in 1873, Spangler accepted an offer to live at Dr. Mudd's farm in Bryantown, Maryland (The two men had become friends in prison). Dr. and Mrs. Mudd gave him 5 acres (20,000 m^{2}) of land to farm. Spangler also performed carpentry chores in the neighborhood. In his final years, Spangler converted to Catholicism.

In February 1875, Spangler became ill with a respiratory ailment, likely tuberculosis, after working in a winter rainstorm. He died on February 7, 1875. He was buried in a graveyard connected with St. Peter's Church which was about two miles (3 km) from Dr. Mudd's home in Charles County, Maryland. A grave marker was placed on his grave site in 1983.

== Statement ==
Shortly after Spangler's death, Dr. Samuel Mudd found a handwritten statement in Spangler's tool chest presumably written by Spangler while he was in prison. In the statement, Spangler describes his relationship with John Wilkes Booth and denies having aided Booth in any manner whatsoever. Spangler's statement reads in part:

I was born in York County, Pennsylvania, and am about forty-three years of age, I am a house carpenter by trade, and became acquainted with J. Wilkes Booth when a boy. I worked for his father in building a cottage in Harford County, Maryland, in 1854.

[...] I have acted as scene shifter in Ford's Theater, ever since it was first opened up, to the night of the assassination of President Lincoln. During the winter of A. D. 1862 and 1863, J. Wilkes Booth played a star engagement at Ford's Theater for two weeks. At that time I saw him and conversed with him quite frequently. After completing his engagement he left Washington and I did not see him again until the winters of A. D. 1864 and 1865. I then saw him at various times in and about Ford's Theater. Booth had free access to the theater at all times, and made himself very familiar with all persons connected with it. He had a stable in the rear of the theater where he kept his horses. A boy, Joseph Burroughs, commonly called 'Peanut John,' took care of them whenever Booth was absent from the city. I looked after his horses, which I did at his request, and saw that they were properly cared for. Booth promised to pay me for my trouble, but he never did. I frequently had the horses exercised, during Booth's absence from the city, by 'Peanut John,' walking them up and down the alley. 'Peanut John' kept the key to the stable in the theater, hanging upon a nail behind the small door, which opened into the alley at the rear of the theater.

Booth usually rode out on horseback every afternoon and evening, but seldom remained out later than eight or nine o'clock. He always went and returned alone. I never knew of his riding out on horseback and staying out all night, or of any person coming to the stable with him, or calling there for him. He had two horses at the stable, only a short time. He brought them there some time in the month of December. A man called George and myself repaired and fixed the stable for him. I usually saddled the horse for him when 'Peanut John' was absent. About the first of March Booth brought another horse and a buggy and harness to the stable, but in what manner I do not know; after that he used to ride out with his horse and buggy, and I frequently harnessed them up for him. I never saw any person ride out with him or return with him from these rides.

On the Monday evening previous to the assassination, Booth requested me to sell the horse, harness, and buggy, as he said he should leave the city soon. I took them the next morning to the horse market, and had them put up at auction, with the instruction not to sell unless they would net two hundred and sixty dollars; this was in accordance with Booth's orders to me. As no person bid sufficient to make them net that amount, they were not sold, and I took them back to the stable. I informed Booth of the result that same evening in front of the theater. He replied that he must then try and have them sold at private sale, and asked me if I would help him. I replied, 'Yes.' This was about six o'clock in the evening, and the conversation took place in the presence of John F. Sleichman and others. The next day I sold them for two hundred and sixty dollars. The purchaser accompanied me to the theater. Booth was not in, and the money was paid to James J. Gifford, who receipted for it. I did not see Booth to speak to him, after the sale, until the evening of the assassination.

Upon the afternoon of April 14 I was told by 'Peanut John' that the President and General Grant were coming to the theater that night, and that I must take out the partition in the President's box. It was my business to do all such work. I was assisted in doing it by Rittespaugh and 'Peanut John.' In the evening, between five and six o'clock, Booth came into the theater and asked me for a halter. I was very busy at work at the time on the stage preparatory to the evening performance, and Rittespaugh went upstairs and brought one down. I went out to the stable with Booth and put the halter upon the horse. I commenced to take off the saddle when Booth said, 'Never mind, I do not want it off, but let it and the bridle remain.' He afterward took the saddle off himself, locked the stable, and went back to the theater.

Booth, Maddox, 'Peanut John,' and myself immediately went out of the theater to the adjoining restaurant next door, and took a drink at Booth's expense. I then went immediately back to the theatre, and Rittespaugh and myself went to supper. I did not see Booth again until between nine and ten o'clock. About that time Deboney called to me, and said Booth wanted me to hold his horse as soon as I could be spared. I went to the back door and Booth was standing in the alley holding a horse by the bridle rein, and requested me to hold it. I took the rein, but told him I could not remain, as Gifford was gone, and that all of the responsibility rested on me. Booth then passed into the theater. I called to Deboney to send 'Peanut John' to hold the horse. He came, and took the horse, and I went back to my proper place.

In about a half hour afterward I heard a shot fired, and immediately saw a man run across the stage. I saw him as he passed by the center door of the scenery, behind which I then stood; this door is usually termed the center chamber door. I did not recognize the man as he crossed the stage as being Booth. I then heard some one say that the President was shot. Immediately all was confusion. I shoved the scenes back as quickly as possible in order to clear the stage, as many were rushing upon it. I was very much frightened, as I heard persons halloo, "Burn the theater!" I did not see Booth pass out; my situation was such that I could not see any person pass out of the back door. The back door has a spring attached to it, and would not shut of its own accord. I usually slept in the theater, but I did not upon the night of the assassination; I was fearful the theater would be burned, and I slept in a carpenter's shop adjoining.

I never heard Booth express himself in favor of the rebellion, or opposed to the Government, or converse upon political subjects; and I have no recollection of his mentioning the name of President Lincoln in any connection whatever. I know nothing of the mortise hole said to be in the wall behind the door of the President's box, or of any wooden bar to fasten or hold the door being there, or of the lock being out of order. I did not notice any hole in the door. Gifford usually attended to the carpentering in the front part of the theater, while I did the work about the stage. Mr. Gifford was the boss carpenter, and I was under him.

== Screen portrayals ==
Murdock MacQuarrie portrayed Edmund Spangler in The Prisoner of Shark Island (1936).

Tom London portrayed Edmund Spangler in the Wagon Train episode "The John Wilbot Story" (1958).

Jerry Fleck portrayed Edmund Spangler in The Lincoln Conspiracy (1977).

Dan DePaola portrayed Edmund Spangler in The Day Lincoln Was Shot (1998).

James Kirk Sparks portrayed Edmund Spangler in The Conspirator (2010).

Todd Fletcher portrayed Edmund Spangler in Killing Lincoln (2013).

Walker Babington portrayed Edmund Spangler in Manhunt (2024).

== See also ==
- List of people pardoned or granted clemency by the president of the United States
