= Dry Tortugas Ferry =

Ferry route in Key West, Florida

Coordinates: 24.56266°N 81.79908°W

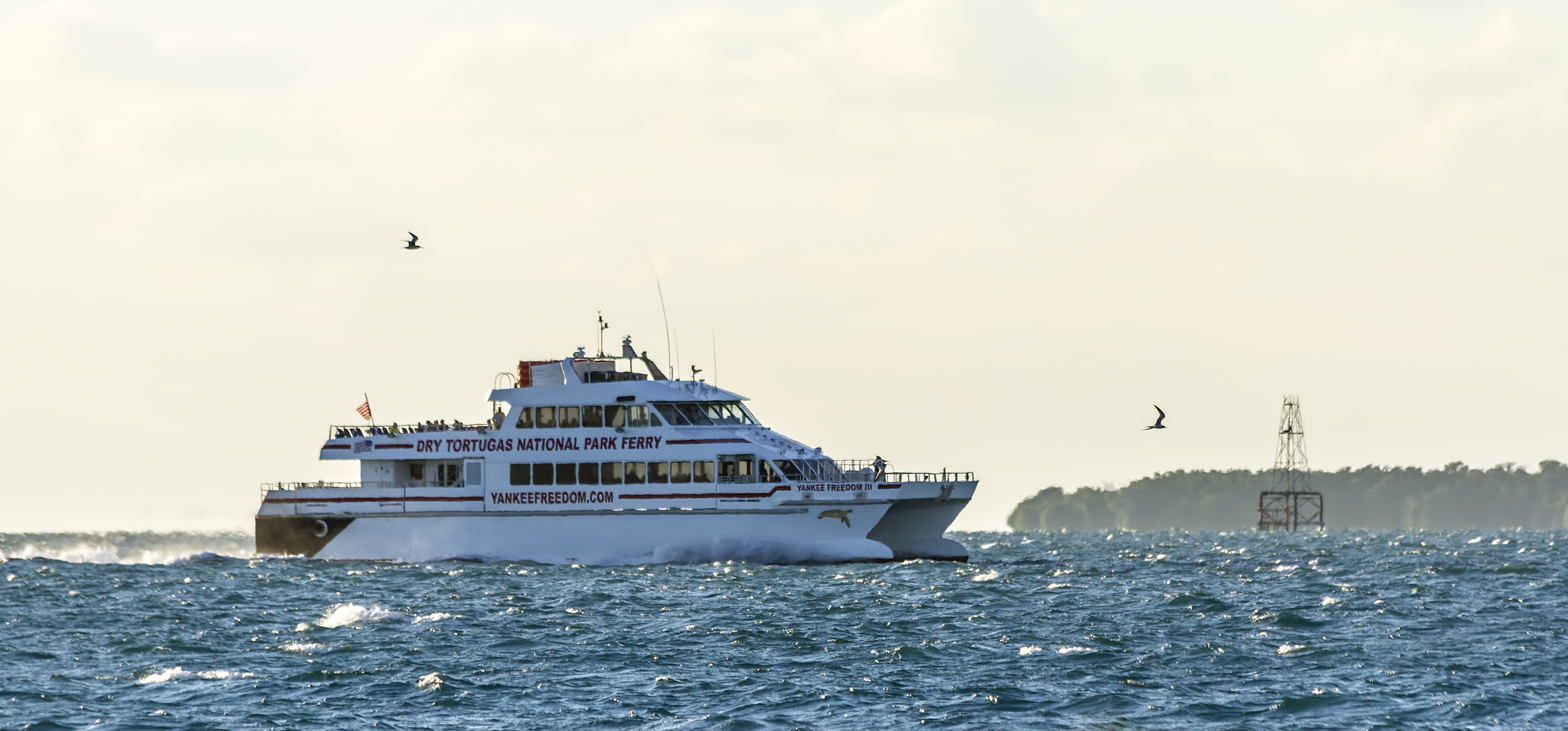
Yankee Freedom III returning to Key West from Dry Tortugas National Park

The Dry Tortugas Ferry to Fort Jefferson is a visitor attraction in Key West, Florida. Service is provided by the Yankee Freedom III, a high-speed Incat Crowther designed catamaran that takes visitors on the almost 70-mile (110 km) trip out to Fort Jefferson in the Dry Tortugas National Park. The service is a licensed National Park Service concessioner, and the only provider of scheduled ferry access to the Dry Tortugas for a ten-year term through 2020.

Built by Gladding-Hearn Shipbuilding, the Yankee Freedom III catamaran is powered by twin Caterpillar, Inc. 3412 engines that give the ferry a maximum speed of 30 knots. The Yankee Freedom III has a passenger capacity of 250 people, with interior and exterior seating for up to 125 people per area. The cabin is fully air conditioned, and the galley has two complete beverage bars. There are also 3 large bathrooms on board including one handicapped facility for passenger convenience.

The Yankee Freedom III is part of the Yankee Fleet. The Yankee Fleet is owned and operated by Jerry Hill, with over seven vessels located in Key West, Florida and Gloucester, Massachusetts. The company focuses on whale watching excursions, deep sea fishing trips and environmental conservation.

The trip passes the uninhabited Marquesas Keys and under good conditions it may be possible to see an abandoned U.S. Air Force radio tower on the northern horizon. Typically the trip to Fort Jefferson takes 2 1/2 to 3 hours each way, with a 4-hour stop for sightseeing and swimming.
