= Samuel Arnold (conspirator) =

Lincoln conspirator (1834–1906)

Samuel Bland Arnold
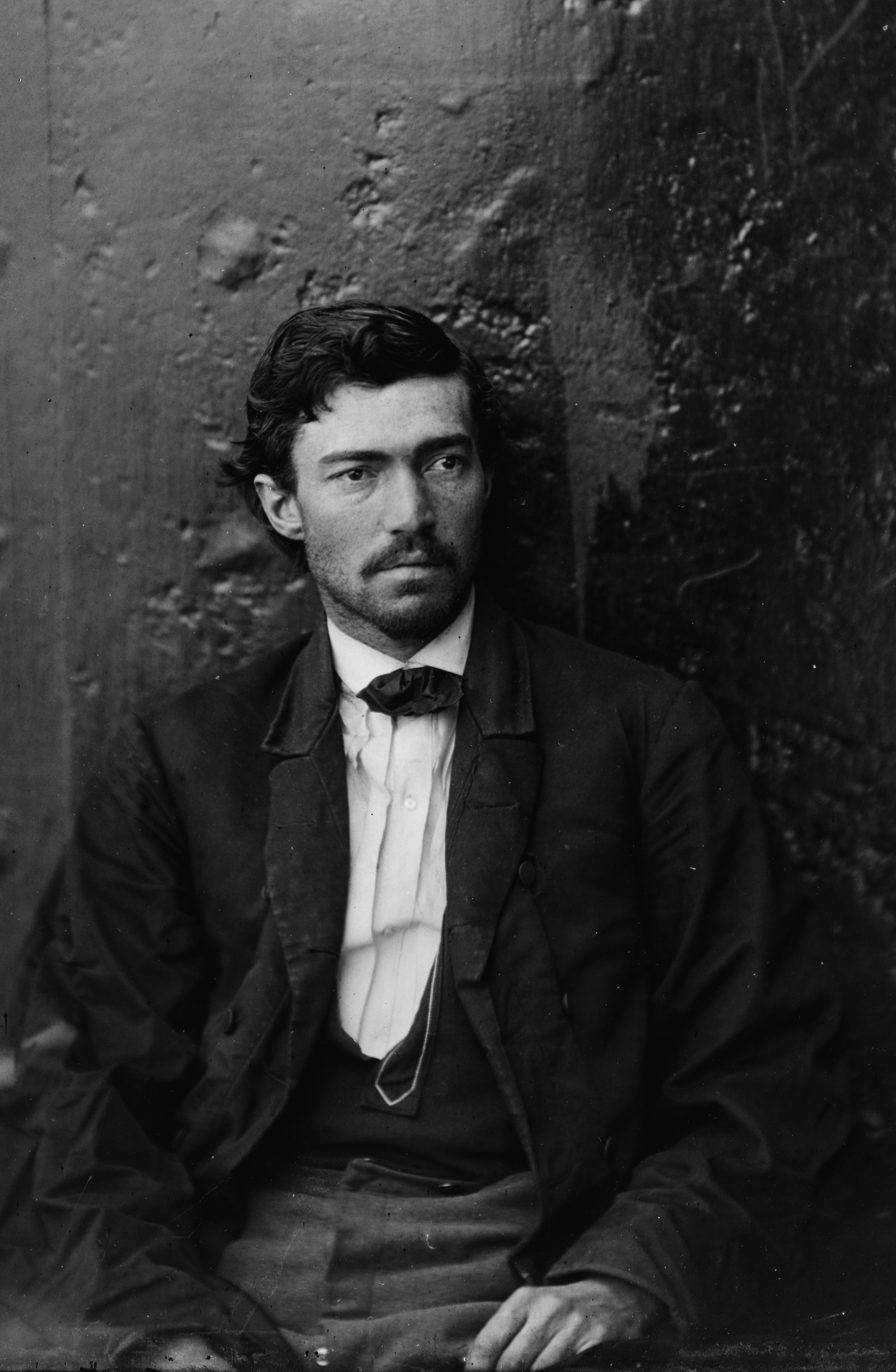
- Arnold after his arrest, 1865
- Born: September 6, 1834; Georgetown, Washington, D.C., U.S.
- Died: September 21, 1906 (aged 72); Baltimore, Maryland, U.S.
- Resting place: Green Mount Cemetery, Baltimore, Maryland
- Status: Deceased
- Conviction: Conspiracy to kidnap Abraham Lincoln
- Penalty: Life imprisonment with hard labor
- Military career
- Allegiance: Confederate States
- Branch: Confederate States Army
- Service years: 1861–1864
- Rank: Private
- Unit: 1st Maryland Infantry

Samuel Bland Arnold (September 6, 1834 – September 21, 1906) was an American Confederate sympathizer involved in a plot to kidnap U.S. President Abraham Lincoln in 1865. He had joined the Confederate Army shortly after the start of the Civil War but was discharged for health reasons in 1864.

== Early life ==
Samuel Arnold was born in the Georgetown section of Washington, D.C., on September 6, 1834. He was the son of Mary Jane and George Arnold, Sr. and had an older brother. The family later moved to Baltimore where Arnold attended St. Timothy's Hall, a military academy – where he and John Wilkes Booth were schoolmates.

== Role in Lincoln kidnapping conspiracy ==
After his discharge, Arnold returned to Baltimore and in the late summer of 1864, he was recruited by Booth to be part of the kidnap plot. Bored and unemployed, Arnold accepted. On March 15, 1865, the conspirators met at Gautier's Restaurant on Pennsylvania Avenue to discuss the plot.

Arnold and the other alleged conspirators, John Wilkes Booth, David Herold, Lewis Powell, Michael O'Laughlen, and John Surratt, were to kidnap Lincoln, ferry him through Van Ness Mansion owned by Thomas Greene, and hold him to exchange for the Confederate prisoners in Washington D.C. This was attempted twice but failed because Lincoln was not where they thought he would be. After the failure, Arnold took a clerk's job in Old Point Comfort, Virginia.

== Arrest and trial ==
After Booth assassinated Lincoln on April 14, 1865, Arnold was arrested from his job in Virginia on suspicion of complicity. He admitted his part in the plot to kidnap Lincoln, and his co-workers supported his contention of being in Virginia at the time of the assassination. During the trial, one of the chief witnesses was Louis J. Weichmann, a boarder at the home of Mary Surratt (the mother of John Surratt).

== Conviction and sentence ==
Arnold was found guilty of conspiracy by a military tribunal and sentenced to life in prison at Fort Jefferson, along with Samuel Mudd, Michael O'Laughlen, and Edmund Spangler. In 1869, Arnold, Mudd, and Spangler were released after being pardoned by President Andrew Johnson (O'Laughlen died in prison in 1867).

== Post-prison years and death ==
After Samuel Arnold returned home, he lived quietly out of the public eye for more than thirty years. In 1898, he returned to Fort Jefferson and took photographs of his old prison, but the photographs have not survived. In 1902, Arnold wrote a series of newspaper articles for the Baltimore American describing his imprisonment at Fort Jefferson. Arnold died four years later on September 21, 1906. He is buried at Green Mount Cemetery in Baltimore, Maryland. The only conspirator who survived him was John Surratt.

== See also ==
- List of people pardoned or granted clemency by the president of the United States
