= Michael O'Laughlen =

Conspirator in the assassination of Abraham Lincoln (1840–1867)

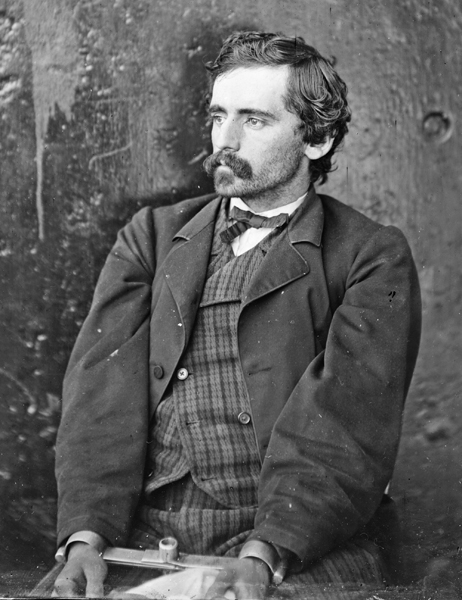
- O'Laughlen after his arrest for conspiracy in the murder of President Abraham Lincoln
- Born: Michael O'Laughlen, Jr. June 3, 1840; Baltimore, Maryland, U.S.
- Died: September 23, 1867 (aged 27); Fort Jefferson, Monroe County, Florida, U.S.
- Resting place: Green Mount Cemetery
- Status: Deceased
- Conviction: Conspiracy to assassinate Abraham Lincoln
- Penalty: Life imprisonment with hard labor

Michael O'Laughlen, Jr. (pronounced Oh-Lock-Lun; June 3, 1840 – September 23, 1867) was an American Confederate soldier and conspirator in John Wilkes Booth's plot to kidnap U.S. President Abraham Lincoln, and later in the latter's assassination, although he ended up not directly participating.

His last name was often misspelled by the press and others as O'Laughlin.

== Early life ==
O'Laughlen was born in Baltimore, Maryland. He was one of John Wilkes Booth's earliest friends as the Booth family lived across the street from the O'Laughlens. He attended St. Timothy's Hall in Catonsville, Maryland with Booth. O'Laughlen learned the trade of manufacturing ornamental plaster work. He also learned the art of engraving. At the start of the Civil War O'Laughlen joined the Confederate Army, but was discharged in June 1862. He returned to Baltimore and joined his brother in the feed and produce business.

== Conspiracy ==
Michael O'Laughlen was one of Booth's earliest recruits. In the fall of 1864 O'Laughlen agreed to become a co-conspirator in the plot to kidnap President Abraham Lincoln. He began spending time in Washington, D.C., with Booth picking up his expenses. On the night of March 15, 1865, O'Laughlen met with Booth and other conspirators at Gautier's Restaurant on Pennsylvania Avenue to discuss the possible abduction of the President. Basically, the plan was to abduct Lincoln and take him to Richmond, Virginia for the purpose of making the Union government exchange prisoners with the Confederacy.

Booth learned that Lincoln was scheduled to attend a matinee performance of the play Still Waters Run Deep at the Campbell Hospital on the outskirts of Washington on March 17, 1865. Booth, O'Laughlen, and the other co-conspirators planned on intercepting the president's carriage. The group lay in wait along the road. Finally, a polished carriage came into view and the gang prepared itself. But the president had changed plans and the carriage was possibly that of Chief Justice Salmon P. Chase. Booth's attempt to kidnap Lincoln had failed. O'Laughlen returned to Baltimore.

Late in March, Booth proposed another kidnap plan. This time, Lincoln was to be captured at Ford's Theatre, handcuffed, and lowered by rope to the stage. Then, the president would be taken to Richmond. However, Booth was not able to convince his co-conspirators that this plan was feasible.

According to O'Laughlen, this was the end of his plotting with Booth. However, O'Laughlen did return to Washington the day before Lincoln's assassination. It is unclear whether this was due to the conspiracy or simply to spend time with friends in Washington. At the trial, there was conflicting testimony about O'Laughlen's movements on the day of the assassination. Whatever the case, O'Laughlen voluntarily surrendered on Monday, April 17, 1865.

O'Laughlen was tried for conspiracy by a military tribunal, along with Mary Surratt, Lewis Powell, George Atzerodt, David Herold, Samuel Arnold, Edmund Spangler and Samuel Mudd. The government attempted to prove he had stalked Secretary of War Edwin Stanton on the nights of April 13 and April 14 with the intent to kill either Stanton or General Ulysses S. Grant, who was staying with Stanton at the time. This was not proven, but there was no doubt O'Laughlen was a willing conspirator through late March. He was found guilty and sentenced to life in prison.

== Prison ==
O'Laughlen was sent to Fort Jefferson in the Dry Tortugas with Spangler, Arnold, and Mudd. He died there of yellow fever.

== After death ==
On February 13, 1869, President Andrew Johnson ordered O'Laughlen's remains to be turned over to his mother. His body was then sent north to Baltimore. He is buried in Baltimore in Green Mount Cemetery. John Wilkes Booth and Samuel Arnold are buried in the same cemetery.

== In popular culture ==
He is a character in National Treasure: Book of Secrets played by Brent Briscoe. Among the film's many historical inaccuracies, O'Laughlen is portrayed as a middle-aged man (he was actually 24 years old in April 1865), and a member of the Knights of the Golden Circle.
