= Samuel Mudd =

American physician implicated in the assassination of Abraham Lincoln

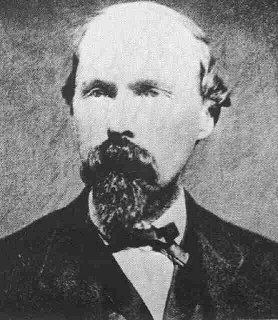
- Undated photo of Mudd
- Born: Samuel Alexander Mudd; December 20, 1833; Charles County, Maryland, U.S.
- Died: January 10, 1883 (aged 49); Waldorf, Maryland, U.S.
- Occupation: Medical doctor
- Known for: Being John Wilkes Booth's doctor
- Spouse: Sarah Frances Dyer (m. 1857)
- Children: 9
- Status: Pardoned (deceased)
- Conviction: Conspiracy to assassinate Abraham Lincoln
- Penalty: Life imprisonment with hard labor

Samuel Alexander Mudd Sr. (December 20, 1833 – January 10, 1883) was an American medical doctor who was accused of conspiring with John Wilkes Booth to assassinate Abraham Lincoln.

Mudd worked as a doctor and tobacco farmer in Southern Maryland. The Civil War seriously damaged his business, especially when Maryland abolished slavery in 1864. That year, he first met Booth, who was planning to kidnap Lincoln, and Mudd was seen in company with three of the conspirators. However, his part in the plot, if any, remains unclear.

Booth fatally shot Lincoln on April 14, 1865, but was injured during his escape from the scene. He subsequently rode with conspirator David Herold to Mudd's home in the early hours of April 15 for surgery on his fractured leg before he crossed into Virginia. Sometime that day, Mudd must have learned of the assassination but did not report Booth's visit to the authorities for another 24 hours. This fact appeared to link him to the crime, as did his various changes of story under interrogation. A military commission found Mudd guilty of aiding and conspiring in a murder, and he was sentenced to life imprisonment, escaping execution by a single vote.

Mudd was pardoned by President Andrew Johnson and released from prison in 1869. Despite repeated attempts by family members and others to have it expunged, his conviction was never overturned.

== Early years ==
Born in Charles County, Maryland into a Roman Catholic family, Samuel Mudd was the fourth of 10 children of Henry Lowe and Sarah Ann (Reeves) Mudd. He grew up on Oak Hill, his father's tobacco plantation of several hundred acres, which was worked by 89 slaves and was located about 30 miles (48 km) southeast of Washington, D.C.

At age 15, after several years of home tutoring, Mudd went off to boarding school at St. John's Literary Institute, now known as Saint John's Catholic Prep School, in Frederick, Maryland. Two years later, he enrolled at Georgetown College in the District of Columbia. He then studied medicine at the University of Maryland, Baltimore, writing his thesis on dysentery.

Upon graduation in 1856, Mudd returned to Charles County to practice medicine, marrying his childhood sweetheart, Sarah Frances Dyer, one year later.

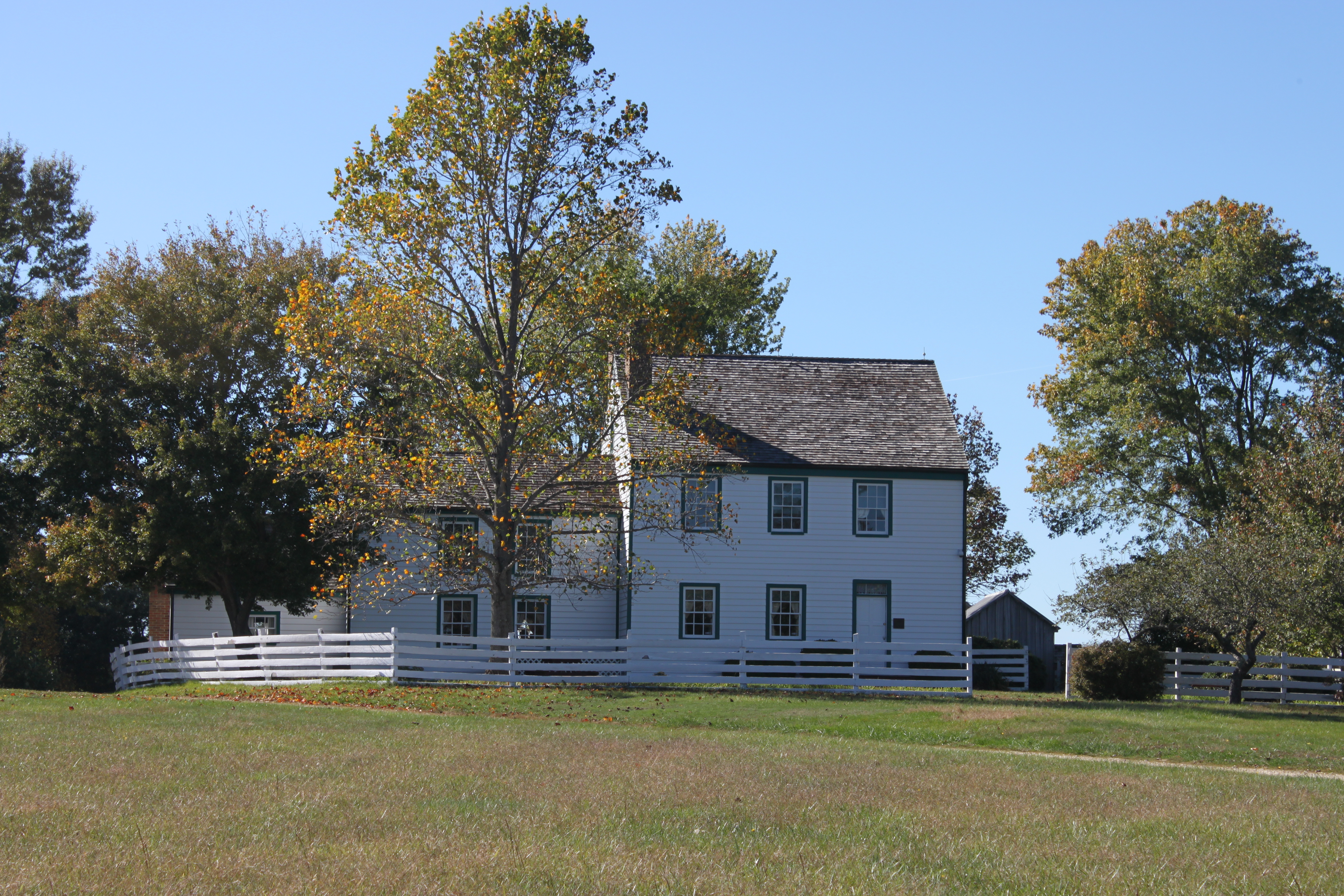
Dr. Samuel Mudd House, known as St. Catharine, now preserved as a museum

As a wedding present, Mudd's father gave the couple 218 acres (88 ha) of his best farmland and a new house named St. Catharine. While the house was under construction, the Mudds lived with Frankie's bachelor brother, Jeremiah Dyer, finally moving into their new home in 1859. They had nine children in all: four before Mudd's arrest and five more after his release from prison. To supplement his income from his medical practice, Mudd became a small-scale tobacco grower, using five slaves according to the 1860 census. Mudd believed that slavery was divinely ordained and wrote a letter to the theologian Orestes Brownson to that effect.

With the outbreak of the American Civil War in 1861, Southern Maryland's slave system and the economy that it supported rapidly began to collapse. In 1863, the Union Army established Camp Stanton, just 10 miles (16 km) from the Mudd farm, to enlist black freedmen and runaway slaves. Six regiments totaling over 8,700 black soldiers, many from Southern Maryland, were trained there. In 1864, Maryland, which was exempt from Lincoln's 1863 Emancipation Proclamation, abolished slavery, making it difficult for growers like Mudd to operate their plantations. As a result, Mudd considered selling his farm and depending on his medical practice. As Mudd pondered his alternatives, he was introduced to someone who said he might be interested in buying his property: 26 year-old actor John Wilkes Booth.

== Booth connection ==
According to a statement made by associated conspirator George Atzerodt, discovered long after his death and recorded while he was in federal custody on May 1, 1865, Mudd knew in advance about Booth's plans; Atzerodt was sure the doctor knew, he said, because Booth had "sent (as he told me) liquors and provisions ... about two weeks before the murder to Dr. Mudd's."

Although that is true, some historians believe there may have been other reasons behind Mudd's relationship with Booth. The trial brought forth many theories of Mudd's involvement in the assassination of Lincoln. One theory posits that Mudd was involved in a completely different conspiracy to gain an upper hand for the southern states. Prior to killing Lincoln, Booth had intended to kidnap the president and ransom him and other political affiliates of the Union for a large sum of money. This plan was in effect until the night of the assassination, when Booth met up with Atzerodt, David Herold, and Lewis Powell (Note: Lewis Powell (conspirator) gave his name as "Lewis Payne" when he was arrested at Mary Surratt's house, days after the murder.) and disclosed the plot to assassinate the president instead. Following the assassination, Powell came forth by stating that Booth had not told him until this meeting and that the other men did not know about the plot until the night of the assassination. This supports the theory that Mudd was an accomplice to a plot to kidnap the president, but not a conspirator to the assassination.

After Booth shot Lincoln on the night of April 14, 1865, he broke his left fibula. According to his diary, this occurred when he jumped from the presidential box while fleeing Ford's Theater. The reliability of this diary is questionable, as Booth intended it more as a manifesto to be published, and he embellished other facts in it. One example is, "I struck boldly and not as the papers say [...] I shouted sic semper before I fired." This is proven untrue by every eyewitness account of the assassination, which independently agreed that Booth shouted after he fired. Furthermore, Booth and Herold told Mudd that Booth broke his leg falling from his horse afterward. If Mudd was indeed a part of the conspiracy, Booth would have no motivation to lie about this to Mudd.

Booth met up with Herold and both men made for Virginia via southern Maryland. They stopped at Mudd's house around 4 AM on April 15; Mudd splinted Booth's leg and gave him a shoe to wear. He also arranged for a carpenter, John Best, to make a pair of crutches for Booth. Booth paid Mudd $25 in greenbacks for his medical treatment. He and Herold spent between twelve and fifteen hours at Mudd's house. They slept in the front bedroom on the second floor. It is unclear whether Mudd had yet been informed that Booth had killed Lincoln.

Mudd went to Bryantown during the day on April 15 to run errands; if he had not already heard the news of the assassination from Booth, he certainly learned of it on the trip. He returned home that evening, and accounts differ as to whether Booth and Herold had already left, whether Mudd met them as they were leaving, and whether they left at Mudd's urging and with his assistance.

It is certain that Mudd did not immediately contact the authorities. When questioned, he stated that he had not wanted to leave his family alone in the house in case the assassins returned and found him absent and his family unprotected. He waited until Mass the following day, Easter Sunday, when he asked his second cousin, George Mudd, a resident of Bryantown, to notify the 13th New York Cavalry in Bryantown, under the command of Lieutenant David Dana. Mudd's delay in contacting the authorities drew suspicion and was a significant factor in tying him to the conspiracy. During his initial investigative interview on April 18, Mudd stated that he had never seen either of the parties before. In his sworn statement of April 22, he told about Booth's visit to Bryantown in November 1864 but then said, "I have never seen Booth since that time to my knowledge until last Saturday morning." Later testimony from Louis J. Weichmann revealed that Mudd hid his meeting with Booth in Washington in December 1864. In prison, Mudd admitted the Washington meeting and said he ran into Booth by chance during a Christmas shopping trip. Mudd's failure to mention the meeting in his interview with detectives proved to be a big mistake: When Weichmann told the authorities of the meeting, they realized that Mudd had misled them and immediately began to treat him as a suspect, rather than a witness.

During the conspiracy trial, Lieutenant Alexander Lovett testified:

On Friday, the 21st of April, I went to Mudd's again, for the purpose of arresting him. When he found we were going to search the house, he said something to his wife, and she went upstairs and brought down a boot. Mudd said he had cut it off the man's leg. I turned down the top of the boot, and saw the name "J. Wilkes" written in it.

== Trial ==
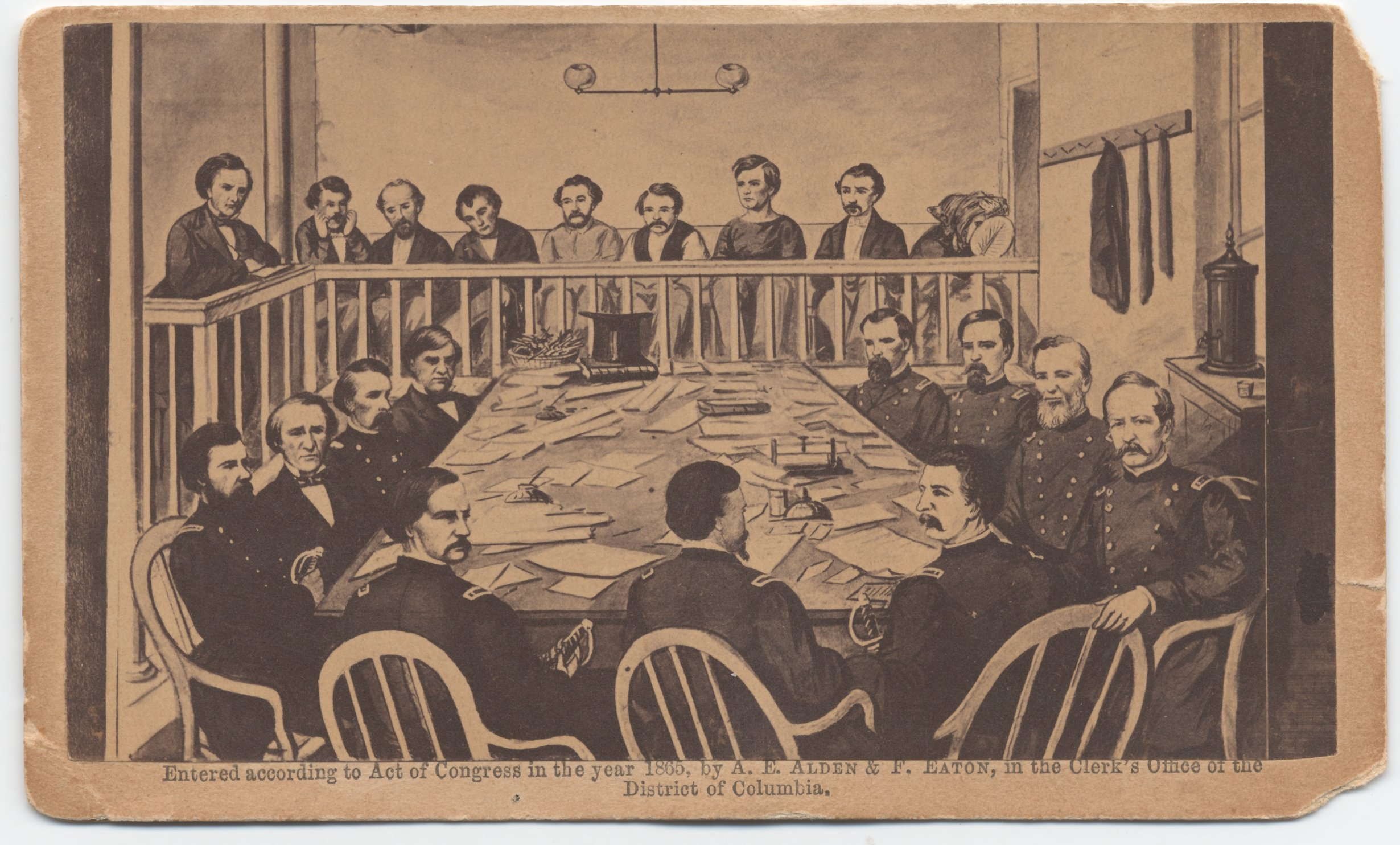
Trial of the conspirators; Mudd is second from the left in the back row

After Booth's death on April 26, 1865, Mudd was arrested and charged with conspiracy to murder Lincoln. Representative Frederick Stone was the senior defense counsel for Mudd. On May 1, President Johnson ordered the formation of a nine-man military commission to try the conspirators. Mudd was represented by General Thomas Ewing Jr. The trial began on May 10. Mary Surratt, Lewis Powell, George Atzerodt, David Herold, Samuel Mudd, Michael O'Laughlen, Edmund Spangler and Samuel Arnold were all charged with conspiring to murder Lincoln. The prosecution called 366 witnesses.

The defense sought to prove that Mudd was a loyal citizen, citing his self-description as a "Union man" and asserting that he was "a deeply religious man, devoted to family, and a kind master to his slaves." The prosecution presented witnesses who testified that he had shot one of his slaves in the leg and threatened to send others to Richmond, Virginia, to assist in the construction of Confederate defenses. The prosecution also contended that he had been a member of a Confederate communications distribution agency and had sheltered Confederate soldiers on his plantation, and that he had been a member of a posse which captured runaway slaves and sent them to Richmond. Several of Mudd's former slaves testified that he had said on multiple occasions that President Lincoln ought to be shot. An acquaintance named Daniel Thomas also testified that in early 1865 Mudd had predicted that Lincoln and his cabinet "would be killed in six or seven weeks".

On June 29, Mudd was found guilty with the others. The testimony of Louis J. Weichmann was crucial in obtaining the convictions. According to historian Edward Steers, the testimony presented by former slaves was also crucial, but it faded from public memory. Mudd escaped execution by one vote and was sentenced to life imprisonment. Surratt, Powell, Atzerodt, and Herold were hanged at the Old Penitentiary at the Washington Arsenal on July 7, 1865.

== Imprisonment ==
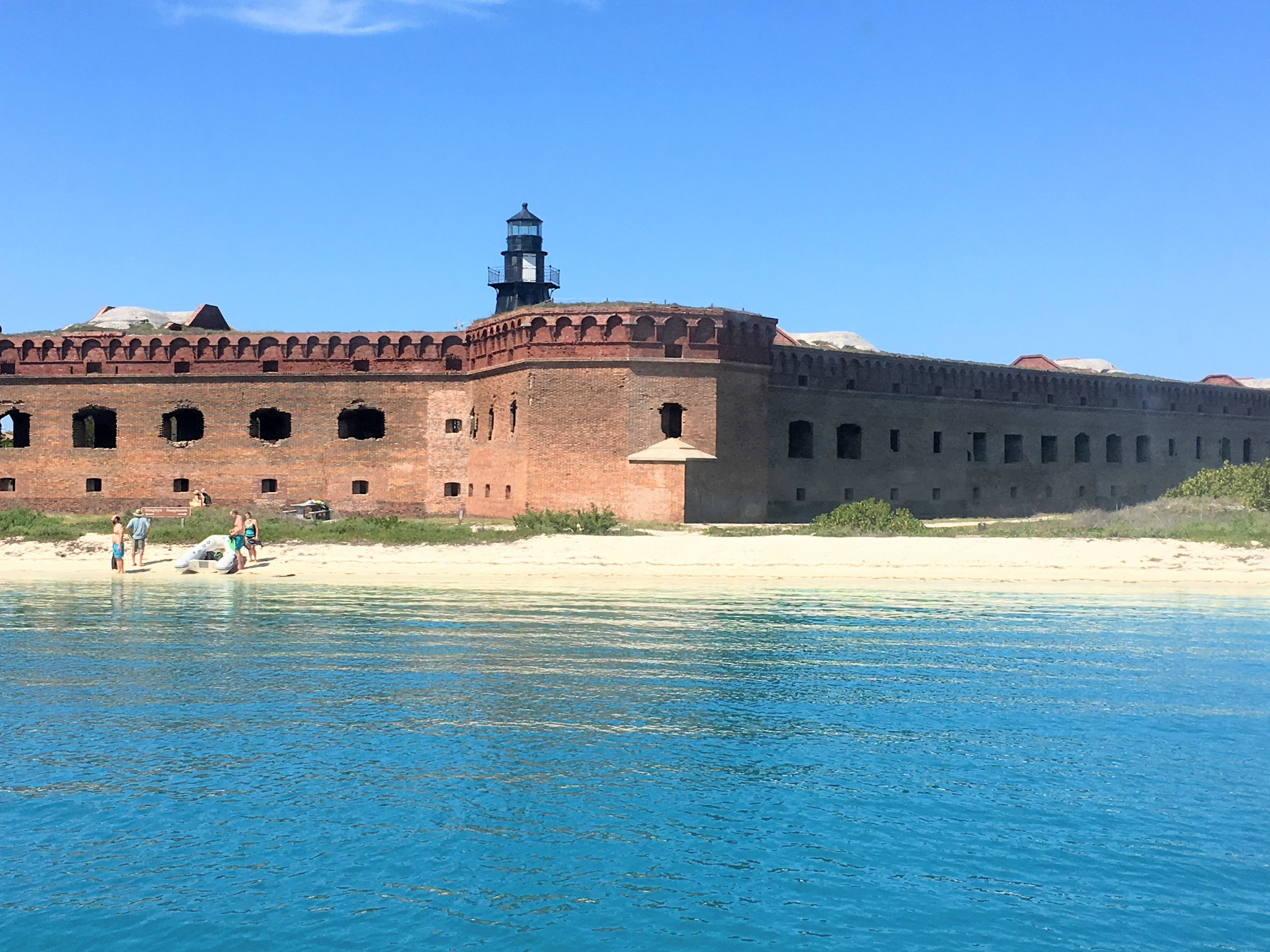
Prison where Mudd was held

Mudd as he appeared while working in the carpenter's shop in the prison at Fort Jefferson, circa 1866–1867

Convicted of conspiracy in the assassination, Mudd, O'Laughlen, Arnold, and Spangler were imprisoned at Fort Jefferson, in the Dry Tortugas, about 70 miles (110 km) west of Key West, Florida. The fort housed Union Army deserters and held about 600 prisoners when Mudd and the others arrived. Prisoners lived on the second tier of the fort, in unfinished, open-air gun rooms called casemates. Mudd and his three companions lived in the casemate directly above the fort's main entrance, called the sally port. In September 1865, two months after Mudd arrived, the control of Fort Jefferson was transferred from the 161st New York Volunteer Infantry Regiment to the 82nd US Colored Troops.

On September 25, 1865, Mudd attempted to escape from Fort Jefferson by stowing away on the transport Thomas A. Scott. He was quickly discovered and placed, along with Arnold, O'Laughlen, Spangler, and George St. Leger Grenfell, in a large empty ground-level gunroom that soldiers referred to as "the dungeon". The men were let out of the dungeon every working day for 12 hours and were required to wear leg irons. However, following a December 22 letter from his wife to President Johnson, the War Department ordered the discontinuance of the shackles and the move to better quarters, which was accomplished by January.

After three months in the dungeon, Mudd and the others were returned to the general prison population. However, because of his attempted escape, Mudd lost his privilege of working in the prison hospital and was assigned to work in the prison carpentry shop with Spangler.

There was an outbreak of yellow fever in the fall of 1867 at the fort. O'Laughlen eventually died of it on September 23. The prison doctor died, and Mudd agreed to take over the position. He was able to help stem the spread of the disease. The soldiers in the fort wrote a petition to Johnson in October 1867 stating the degree of Mudd's assistance: "He inspired the hopeless with courage and by his constant presence in the midst of danger and infection.... [Many] doubtless owe their lives to the care and treatment they received at his hands." Probably as a reward for his work in the yellow fever epidemic, Mudd was reassigned from the carpentry shop to a clerical job in the Provost Marshal's office, where he remained until his pardon.

== Later life ==
The influence of his defense attorney, Thomas Ewing Jr., who had connections in President Johnson's administration, was one reason why Mudd was pardoned by Johnson on February 8, 1869. He was released from prison on March 8, 1869, and returned to his home in Maryland on March 20, 1869. On March 2, 1869, three weeks after he pardoned Mudd, Johnson also pardoned Spangler and Arnold. When Mudd returned home, well-wishing friends and strangers, as well as inquiring newspaper reporters, besieged him. Mudd was very reluctant to talk to the press because he felt it had misquoted him in the past. He gave one interview to the New York Herald after his release but immediately regretted it, and complained that the article had several factual errors and misrepresented his work during the yellow fever epidemic. On the whole, though, Mudd continued to enjoy the support of his friends and neighbors. He resumed his medical practice and slowly brought the family farm back to productivity. In 1873, Spangler traveled to the Mudd farm, where Mudd and his wife welcomed him. Spangler lived with the Mudd family for about 18 months, earning his keep by doing carpentry, gardening, and other farm chores, until Spangler's death on February 7, 1875.

Mudd always had an interest in politics. In prison, he learned about political happenings by reading the newspapers that were sent to him. After his release, he again became active in community affairs. In 1874, he was elected chief officer of the local farmers association, the Bryantown Grange. In 1876, he was elected vice president of the local Democratic Tilden-Hendricks presidential election committee. Tilden lost that year to Republican Rutherford B. Hayes in a hotly-disputed election. The next year, Mudd ran as a Democratic candidate for the Maryland House of Delegates, but was defeated by the popular Republican William Mitchell.

Mudd's ninth child, Mary Eleanor "Nettie" Mudd, was born in 1878. In 1880, the Port Tobacco Times reported that Mudd's barn which contained almost 8000 lb. of tobacco, two horses, a wagon, and farm implements was destroyed by fire.

== Death ==
Mudd was 49 years old when he died of pneumonia, on January 10, 1883, and he was buried in the cemetery at St. Mary's Catholic Church in Bryantown, the same church where he had once met Booth.

== Rehabilitation attempts ==
External videos
- Booknotes interview with Edward Steers, Jr. on Blood on the Moon: The Assassination of Abraham Lincoln

The degree of Samuel Mudd's culpability has remained controversial. Some claim that Mudd was innocent of any wrongdoing, including Mudd's grandson Richard Mudd, and that he had merely been imprisoned for treating a man who came to his house late at night with a fractured leg. Over a century after the assassination, Presidents Jimmy Carter and Ronald Reagan both wrote letters to Richard Mudd in which they argued that his grandfather had committed no crime. However, others, including authors Edward Steers, Jr. and James Swanson, assert that there is evidence that Samuel Mudd visited Booth three times in the months before the failed kidnapping attempt.

The first time was November 1864 when Booth was looking for help in his kidnapping plot and was directed to Mudd by agents of the Confederate Secret Service. In December, Booth again met with Mudd and spent the night at his farm. Later that December, Mudd went to Washington and introduced Booth to Confederate agent John Surratt. Additionally, George Atzerodt testified that Booth sent supplies to Mudd's house in preparation for the kidnapping plan. Mudd lied to the authorities who came to his house after the assassination, claiming that he did not recognize the man who showed up on his doorstep in need of treatment, and giving them false information about where Booth and Herold went. He also hid the monogrammed boot that he had cut off Booth's injured leg behind a panel in his attic, but the thorough search of Mudd's house soon revealed this further piece of evidence which was later used against him.

Contradicting the above statement that Booth's boot was only found after a search is the testimony of Lieutenant Alexander Lovett that Mudd turned the boot over to him, saying he had cut it off of Booth's leg. Furthermore, direct trial testimonies of four witnesses during May 17, 1865 report the same thing. The testimonies are as follows:

- William Williams, "She said that the man with the broken leg had left his boot in the bed. She then went and brought the boot down."
- Simon Gavacan, "His wife then went up stairs and brought down a boot and a razor".
- Joshua Lloyd, "Mrs. Mudd brought us the boot, and when the Doctor saw that we had the boot, he admitted that Booth had been there".
- Lieutenant Alexander Lovett, "It was not until after we had been in the house some minutes, and one of the men said we should have to search the house, that Dr. Mudd told us the boot had been found, and his wife brought it to us". This direct record of Lt. Lovett's testimony differs from the transcripts of Williams (2012).

One hypothesis is that Mudd was originally complicit in the kidnapping plot, likely as the person whom the conspirators would have turned to for medical treatment in case Lincoln was injured, and that Booth thus remembered the doctor and went to his house to get help in the early hours of April 15.

Mudd's grandson Richard unsuccessfully tried to clear his grandfather's name of the stigma of aiding Booth. In 1951, he published The Mudd Family of the United States, a two-volume history of the Mudd family beginning with Thomas Mudd, who arrived from England in 1665. A second edition was published in 1969. His papers detailed his attempts to clear his grandfather's name; they were donated to Georgetown University's Lauinger Library after his death in 2002. They are available to the public in the Special Collections Department.

In 1992, Representatives Steny Hoyer and Thomas W. Ewing introduced House Bill 1885 to overturn the conviction, but it failed in committee. Mudd then turned to the Army Board for Correction of Military Records, which recommended that the conviction be overturned on the basis that Mudd should have been tried by a civilian court. The recommendation was rejected by Acting Army Assistant Secretary William D. Clark. Mudd attempted several other legal venues, ending in 2003 when the US Supreme Court refused to hear the case because the deadline for filing had been missed.

The Dr. Samuel A. Mudd House was listed on the National Register of Historic Places in 1974. The house on the Booth's Escape Scenic Byway is operated today as a historic house museum.

== Portrayals ==
Mudd's life was the subject of a 1936 film, The Prisoner of Shark Island, directed by John Ford and scripted by Nunnally Johnson. Mudd was portrayed by Warner Baxter. Film critic Leonard Maltin in his Classic Movie Guide (2015) described Baxter's performance as "superb".

A radio adaptation of The Prisoner of Shark Island aired, as an episode of the radio series Lux Radio Theater, with Gary Cooper as Mudd, on May 2, 1938, in which significant dramatic license was used by introducing fictional characters and altering several of the known facts of the case for melodramatic expediency. For example, Fort Jefferson was never called "Shark Island".

Another production, with the same title, aired on the radio series Encore Theatre in 1946.

Another film, The Ordeal of Dr. Mudd, was made in 1980, starring Dennis Weaver as Mudd. All of these productions espoused the point of view that Mudd was essentially innocent of any conspiracy.

Roger Mudd (1928–2021), an Emmy Award-winning journalist, television host and former CBS, NBC, and PBS news anchor, was related to Samuel Mudd, but he was not a descendant, as has mistakenly been reported.

Samuel Mudd's life was the subject of an episode of the TV western Laramie, "Time of the Traitor" which aired in 1962.

On the episode "Swiss Diplomacy" on The West Wing, the First Lady and cardiac surgeon, Abby Bartlet, contends the duty of a physician to treat an injured patient despite potential legal repercussions, saying of Mudd's conviction: "So that's the way it goes. You set the leg."

Samuel Mudd's name is sometimes given as the origin of the phrase "your name is mud," as in, for example, the 2007 feature film National Treasure: Book of Secrets. However, according to an online etymology dictionary, the phrase has its earliest known recorded instance in 1823, ten years before Mudd's birth, and it is based on an obsolete sense of the word "mud" meaning "a stupid twaddling fellow."

Mudd was portrayed by Matt Walsh in the 2024 Apple TV+ miniseries series Manhunt.

== See also ==
- List of people pardoned or granted clemency by the president of the United States
