= Dry Tortugas National Park =

National Park in Florida, United States

- IUCN category II (national park)
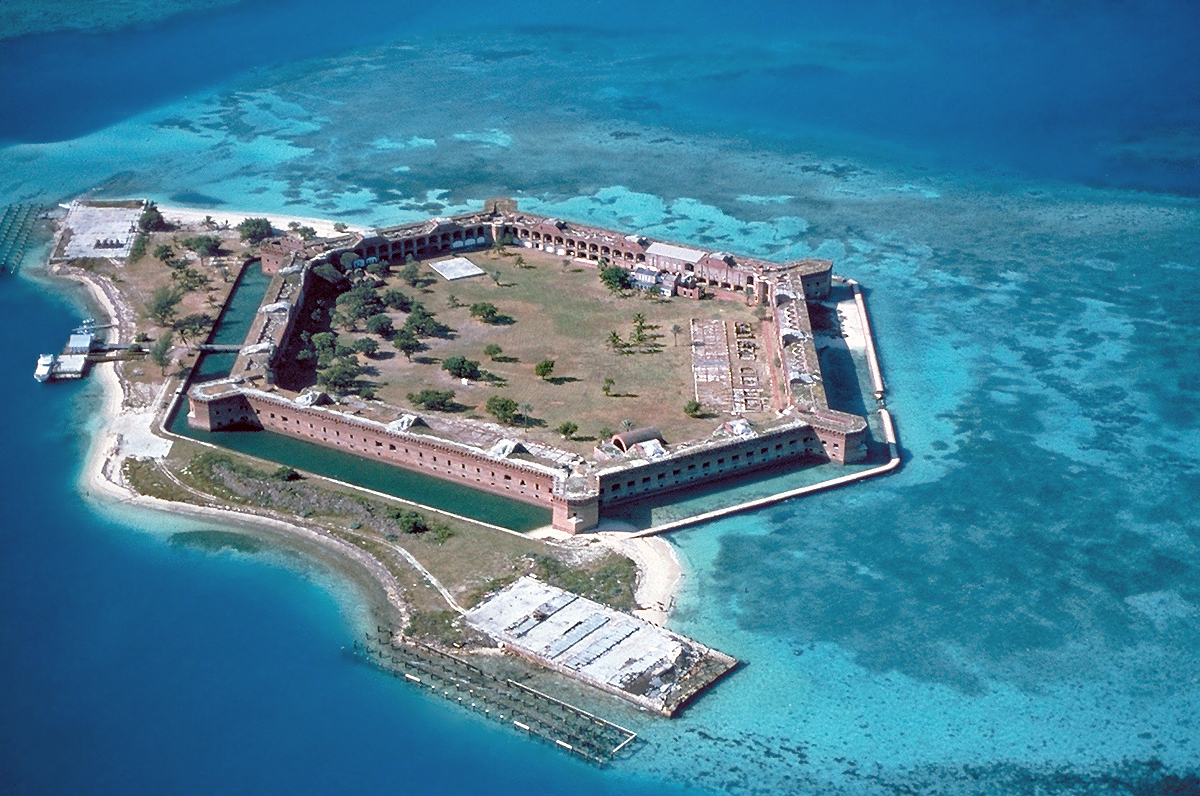
- Fort Jefferson and Garden Key
- Interactive map of Dry Tortugas National Park
- Location: Monroe County, Florida, United States
- Nearest city: Key West
- Coordinates: 24°37′43″N 82°52′24″W
- Area: 64,701 acres (261.84 km^{2})
- Established: January 4, 1935
- Visitors: 89,355 (in 2025)
- Governing body: National Park Service
- Website: nps.gov/drto

Dry Tortugas
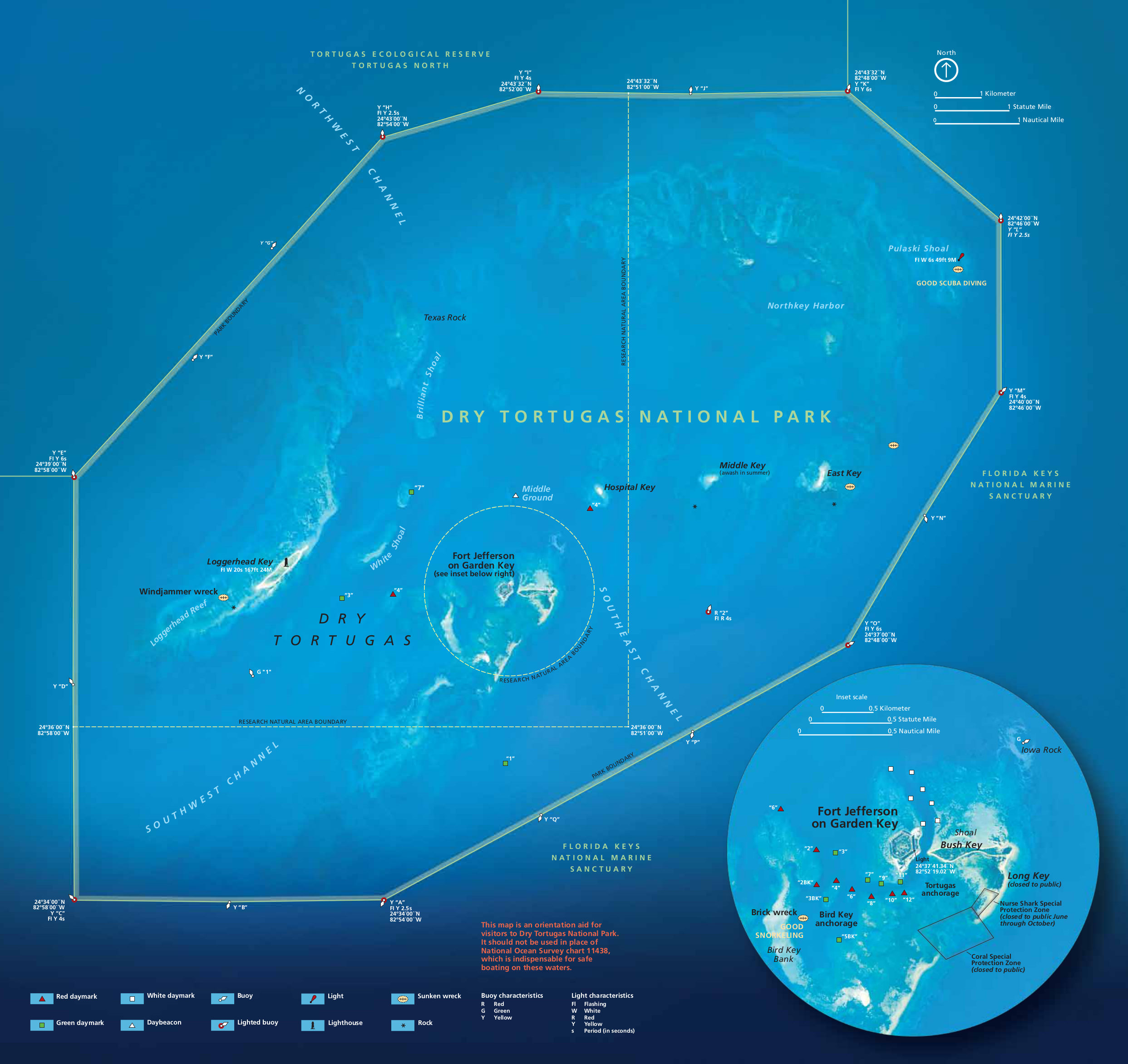
- National Park Service map of the Dry Tortugas
- Interactive map of Dry Tortugas

Geography
- Location: end of the Florida Keys, United States
- Coordinates: 24°38′00″N 82°55′12″W
- Archipelago: Florida Keys
- Adjacent to: Gulf of Mexico
- Total islands: 7
- Major islands: Garden Key
- Area: 10,000,000 acres (4,000,000 ha)
- Highest elevation: 10 ft (3 m)

Dry Tortugas National Park is a national park of the United States located about 68 miles (109 km) west of Key West in the Gulf of Mexico, in the United States. The park preserves Fort Jefferson and the several Dry Tortugas islands, the westernmost and most isolated of the Florida Keys. The archipelago's coral reefs are the least disturbed of the Florida Keys reefs.

The park is noted for abundant sea life, tropical bird breeding grounds, colorful coral reefs, and shipwrecks and sunken treasures. The park's centerpiece is Fort Jefferson, a massive but unfinished coastal fortress. Fort Jefferson is the largest brick masonry structure in the Western Hemisphere, composed of more than 16 million bricks. Dry Tortugas is unique in its combination of a largely undisturbed tropical ecosystem with significant historic artifacts. The park is accessible only by seaplane or boat and has averaged about 63,000 visitors annually in the period from 2008 to 2017. Activities include snorkeling, picnicking, birdwatching, camping, scuba diving, saltwater fishing and kayaking. Overnight camping is limited to eight primitive campsites at the Garden Key campground, located just south of Fort Jefferson.

Dry Tortugas National Park is part of the Everglades & Dry Tortugas Biosphere Reserve, established by UNESCO in 1976 under its Man and the Biosphere Programme.

== Geography ==
The Dry Tortugas are a small archipelago of coral islands about 70 miles (110 km) west of Key West, Florida. They represent the westernmost extent of the Florida Keys, though several reefs and submarine banks continue westward outside the park, beyond the Tortugas.

The park area is more than 99 percent water. The northern and western portions of the park, including the central island group, were designated a 46-square-mile (120 km^{2}) research natural area in 2007, in which no marine life may be taken, nor may vessels anchor. Vessels wishing to moor in this area must use designated mooring buoys or docks. About 54 percent of the park remains open for fishing. The park is bordered on the east, south and west by the Florida Keys National Marine Sanctuary, and on the northwest by the Tortugas Ecological Reserve.

The keys are low and irregular. Some have thin growths of mangroves, and various other vegetation, while the smallest have only small patches of grass, or no plant life. There are nominally seven islands, but there have been up to eleven during the past two centuries. The islands are continually changing in size and shape, and the number of distinct landmasses varies, as changing water levels expose and cover the lower islands and sandy land bridges between some of the islands. Some of the smaller islands have disappeared and reappeared multiple times as a result of hurricane impact. The major islands within the park are, roughly from west to east, Loggerhead Key, Garden Key, Bush Key, Long Key, Hospital Key, Middle Key, and East Key. The total land area within the park varies with water level. The total land area is about 144 acres (58 hectares).

Island	Acres	% of total
Total	144.39	100
Loggerhead Key	64.25	44.49
Garden Key	42	29.09
Bush Key	29.65	20.54
Long Key	2	1.39
Hospital Key	0.99	0.69
Middle Key	1.5	1.04
East Key	4	2.77

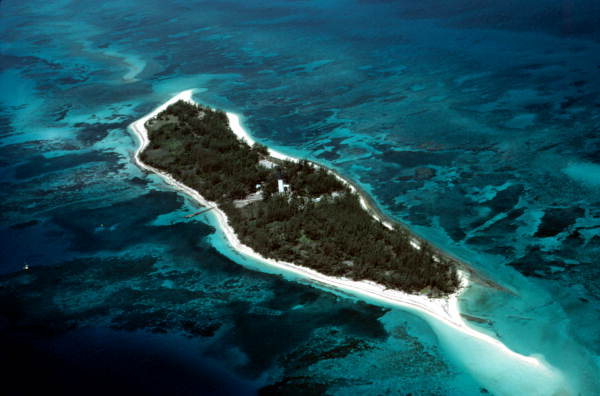
- An aerial view of Loggerhead Key
  Loggerhead Key, 250 by 1,200 m (820 by 3,940 ft) in size, with an area of 26 hectares (64 acres) is the largest. This island has the highest elevation in the Dry Tortugas, at 10 ft (3.0 m). The Dry Tortugas lighthouse, 46 m (151 ft) high, is on this island.
- Garden Key, with Fort Jefferson and the inactive Garden Key lighthouse (20 m (66 ft)). It is 4 km (2.5 mi) east of Loggerhead Key. Garden Key is the second largest island in the chain, at 400 by 500 m (1,300 by 1,600 ft) in size, with an area of 17 hectares (42 acres). The original size, before construction of Fort Jefferson, has been estimated at 30,350 to 35,610 m^{2} (7.50 to 8.80 acres).
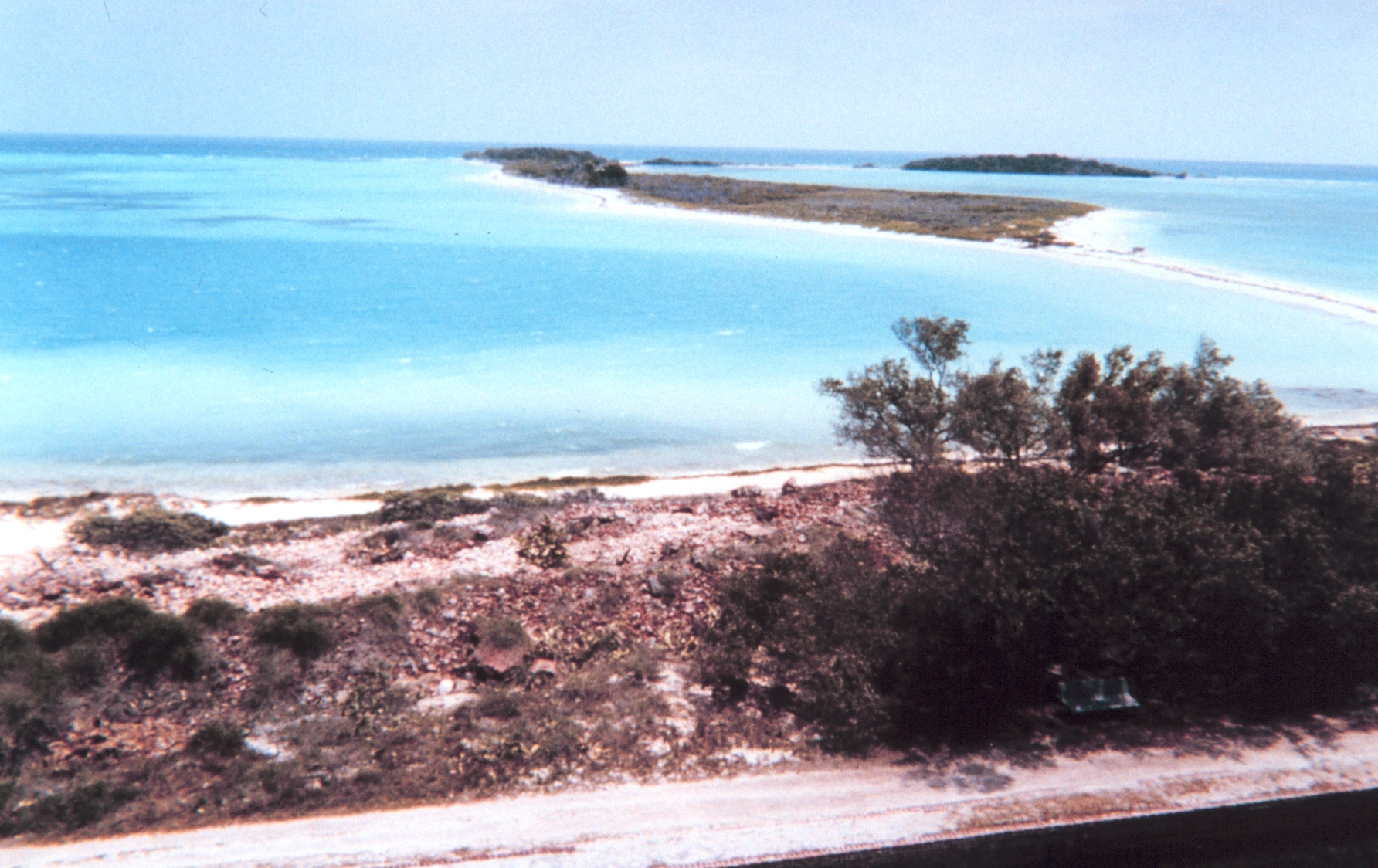
- Bush Key (background) seen from Garden Key (foreground), with Long Key in the very back right
  Bush Key, formerly named Hog Island because of the hogs that were raised there to provide fresh meat for the prisoners at Fort Jefferson, just a few meters east of Garden Key. At times, Bush Key is connected to Garden Key by a sand bar. The island is the third largest, 150 by 900 m (490 by 2,950 ft), area 12 hectares (30 acres), less than 1 m (3 ft 3 in) high. Bush Key is the site of a large tern rookery. It is closed to visitors from February to September to protect nesting sooty terns and brown noddies.
- Long Key, 59 m (194 ft) south of the eastern end of Bush Key, 50 by 200 m (160 by 660 ft) in size, area of 8,000 m^{2} (2.0 acres). At times it is connected to Bush Key by a sandbar.
- Hospital Key, so called because a hospital for the inmates of Fort Jefferson had been built there in the 1870s. The island was formerly called Middle Key or Sand Key. It lies 2.5 km (1.6 mi) northeast of Garden Key and Bush Key, 70 m (230 ft). Its area is 4,000 m^{2} (0.99 acres), and it is 1 m (3 ft 3 in) above sea level at its highest point.
- Middle Key, 2.5 km (1.6 mi) east of Hospital key, 90 m (300 ft), area 6,000 m^{2} (1.5 acres). Due to various seasonal changes, storm patterns and tidal cycles it is not always above sea level, disappearing for weeks or months, only to reappear again.
- East Key, 2 km (1.2 mi) east of Middle Key, 100 by 200 m (330 by 660 ft), area 1.6 hectares (4.0 acres), over 2 m (6 ft 7 in) high.

The three westernmost keys, which are also the three largest keys (Loggerhead Key, Garden Key, and Bush Key), make up about 93 percent of the total land area of the group.

=== Former islands ===
Formerly existing keys were (from west to east):

- Southwest Key, disappeared by 1876, today a shoal south off of Loggerhead Reef.
- Bird Key (formerly Booby Key), was about 1.5 km (0.93 mi) southwest of Garden Key, disappeared in 1935. Current names in the area are Bird Key Bank and Bird Key Harbor. The Key was the site of numerous Union soldiers' graves during the Civil War.
- North Key, probably identical with former Booby Island, current name in the area is North Key Harbor, an anchorage WSW of Pulaski Shoal, disappeared by 1875.
- Northeast Key (earlier called Sand Key), was between East Key and North Key, slightly to the North, disappeared by 1875.

=== Shoals with lights ===
- Pulaski Shoal (Pulaski Reef), marking the northeast edge of the group at 24°41′36″N 82°46′24″W, is not an island, but the former location of the Pulaski Shoal Light.
- Iowa Rock, halfway between Garden Key and Hospital Key, is another site of a navigational light (and weather station) built in shallow water. It was destroyed by Hurricane Hugo, with three bare stumps left.

== Geology ==
The Dry Tortugas is the western extension of an arcuate chain of Pleistocene reef and oolitic limestone islands, with the eastern limit in the vicinity of Miami. These Florida Keys are the surface expression of the 3.7 mi (6.0 km) thick southern Florida carbonate platform, which has been accumulating sediments since the Early Cretaceous. Two stratigraphic units are exposed at the surface, the Key Largo Limestone and the Miami Limestone. The Key Largo Limestone are reefs up to 200 ft (61 m) thick, parallel to the shelf edge, consisting of hermatypic corals and calcarenites. The Miami Limestone is less than 49 ft (15 m) thick, and in general is found behind the Key Largo Limestone reef, but overlies it in the western extent of the keys. It consists of a bryozoan facies and an oolitic facies and represents a subtidal shoal. Additionally, excellent examples of Holocene carbonate-sand deposits are found in the Dry Tortugas, consisting mainly of disarticulated Halimeda plates. Between the Dry Tortugas and Key West is a 39 ft (12 m) thick example of these sand deposits, known as "the quicksands".

== Climate ==
Dry Tortugas has a tropical savanna climate (Aw), with a rainy season coinciding with the Atlantic hurricane season from May to October and a dry season extending from November through April. Despite occasional exposure to tropical systems, the Dry Tortugas is the driest place in Florida with an annual precipitation of about 38 in (970 mm). There is no large jungle or forest canopy area on the islands, and the sandy soil (which drains quickly) and intense sun only enhance the drought-like conditions often found on the islands. Seasonally there is little temperature variation, with high temperatures in summer around 91 °F (33 °C) and low temperatures in winter around 65 °F (18 °C). Like the rest of the lower keys, there has never been a recorded frost or freeze. The hardiness zone is 12a, with an annual mean minimum temperature of 52 °F (11 °C).

Climate data for Dry Tortugas, Florida (1991–2020 normals, extremes 1950–present)
Month	Jan	Feb	Mar	Apr	May	Jun	Jul	Aug	Sep	Oct	Nov	Dec	Year
Record high °F (°C)	89 (32)	92 (33)	93 (34)	94 (34)	96 (36)	99 (37)	98 (37)	101 (38)	98 (37)	95 (35)	90 (32)	88 (31)	101 (38)
Mean daily maximum °F (°C)	73.9 (23.3)	75.5 (24.2)	78.7 (25.9)	82.7 (28.2)	86.0 (30.0)	89.2 (31.8)	91.0 (32.8)	91.4 (33.0)	88.9 (31.6)	85.0 (29.4)	79.4 (26.3)	75.7 (24.3)	83.1 (28.4)
Daily mean °F (°C)	69.3 (20.7)	70.5 (21.4)	73.1 (22.8)	76.9 (24.9)	80.3 (26.8)	83.3 (28.5)	84.4 (29.1)	85.2 (29.6)	83.4 (28.6)	80.4 (26.9)	74.9 (23.8)	71.2 (21.8)	77.7 (25.4)
Mean daily minimum °F (°C)	64.7 (18.2)	65.5 (18.6)	67.5 (19.7)	71.1 (21.7)	74.5 (23.6)	77.4 (25.2)	77.9 (25.5)	79.0 (26.1)	77.9 (25.5)	75.8 (24.3)	70.5 (21.4)	66.6 (19.2)	72.4 (22.4)
Record low °F (°C)	46 (8)	40 (4)	47 (8)	56 (13)	55 (13)	64 (18)	64 (18)	65 (18)	66 (19)	59 (15)	51 (11)	48 (9)	40 (4)
Average precipitation inches (mm)	2.35 (60)	1.69 (43)	2.07 (53)	2.60 (66)	2.02 (51)	4.26 (108)	2.19 (56)	4.31 (109)	7.18 (182)	4.72 (120)	1.88 (48)	2.36 (60)	37.63 (956)
Average precipitation days (≥ 0.01 in)	6.9	5.7	4.1	4.2	4.5	7.4	8.7	10.4	11.9	9.8	4.3	6.1	84.0
Source: NOAA

== History ==
The first European to see the Dry Tortugas was Juan Ponce de León, who visited on June 21, 1513. Ponce de León caught 160 sea turtles there and subsequently referred to the islands as the "Tortugas" (turtles). They are called Dry owing to the absence of surface fresh water on the island. The name is the second oldest surviving European place-name in the US.

The archipelago includes a high concentration of historically significant shipwrecks dating from the 17th century to the present. In 1742 HMS Tyger wrecked in the Dry Tortugas. The stranded crew lived on Garden Key for 56 days, and fought a battle with a Spanish sloop, before sailing to Jamaica in several boats.

Florida was acquired from Spain by the United States in 1819. The Dry Tortugas were seen as a strategic point for the control of the Straits of Florida and the Gulf of Mexico. Work on a lighthouse on Garden Key started in 1825. In 1856 work on a new, more powerful lighthouse on Loggerhead Key was started to replace the Garden Key light.

John James Audubon visited the Tortugas in 1832 and so did Louis Agassiz in 1858.

The Dry Tortugas is also rich in maritime history. In 1989 Seahawk Deep Ocean Technology explored a shipwreck believed to be part of the 1622 Spanish treasure fleet. The wreck located in 1,332 ft (406 m) of water, yielded olive jars, copper, gold, silver, glass and other cultural artifacts. On September 6, 1622, the Nuestra Señora de Atocha was driven by a severe hurricane onto a coral reef near the Dry Tortugas, about 35 mi (56 km) west of Key West. Mel Fisher and his company discovered the wreck July 20, 1985. The estimated $450 million cache recovered, known as "The Atocha Motherlode", included 40 tons of gold and silver; there were some 114,000 of the Spanish silver coins known as pieces of eight, gold coins, Colombian emeralds, gold and silver artifacts, and 1,000 silver ingots. In addition to the Atocha, Fisher's company, Salvors Inc., found remains of several nearby shipwrecks, including the Atocha's sister galleon the Santa Margarita, lost in the same year, and the remains of a slave ship known as the Henrietta Marie, lost in 1700.

=== Fort Jefferson ===
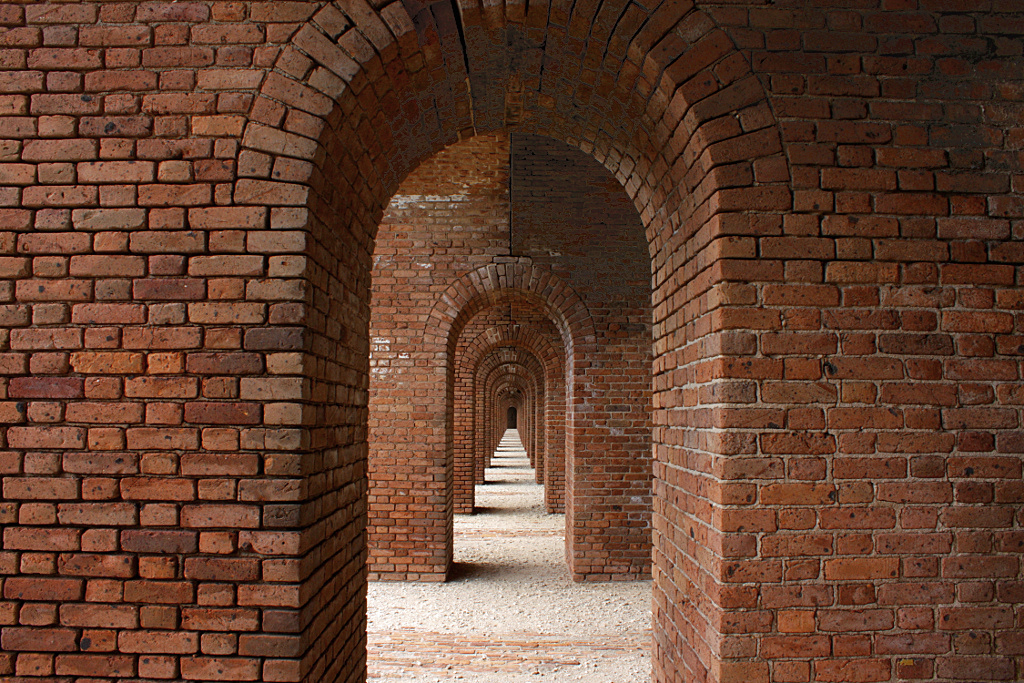
Brick archway in Fort Jefferson

Fort Jefferson is a massive but unfinished coastal fortress. It is the largest masonry structure in the Western Hemisphere, and is composed of more than 16 million bricks.

Planning for a fortification began almost immediately after American acquisition, and construction started in 1847. Work was half complete in 1860. Workers consisted mostly of enslaved Black people hired from their owners in Key West and other parts of the State of Florida. Some White laborers, mostly Irish immigrants were also employed. The use of enslaved labor was discontinued in 1863. This bastion remained in Union hands throughout the Civil War. It later was used as a prison until abandoned in 1874. Dr. Samuel Mudd, famous for being the doctor who treated John Wilkes Booth in the wake of the Lincoln assassination, was imprisoned here for conspiracy with three others until early 1869, when he was pardoned in 1869 after averting a viral outbreak. Also imprisoned was a leader of the "Chicago Conspiracy", Englishman George St. Leger Grenfell, who is supposed to have drowned having escaped in a small boat.

During the 1880s, the Navy established a base in the Dry Tortugas, and it subsequently set up a coaling (refueling) and a Wireless (radio) station there as well. During World War I, a seaplane base was established in the islands, but it was abandoned soon thereafter.

From 1903 until 1939 the Carnegie Institution of Washington operated the Marine Biology Laboratory on Loggerhead Key which "...quickly became the best-equipped marine biological station in the tropical world". Through the years, over 150 researchers used the facilities to perform a wide range of research. In June 1911 the laboratory built a vessel in Miami, Anton Dohrn, for use by researchers as well as logistics between the station and Key West. The vessel, excepting a period of World War I service with the Navy, supported the laboratory's work until closure in 1939 and donation of Anton Dohrn to the Woods Hole Oceanographic Institution.

An account of a visit to the fort at the Dry Tortugas by President Franklin D. Roosevelt and Justice-to-be Robert H. Jackson can be found in Jackson's book That Man: An Insider's Portrait of Franklin D. Roosevelt.

=== History of African Americans on the island ===
Fort Jefferson was home to African Americans not only as enslaved persons but also as Union Soldiers, freedmen and prisoners. Starting in 1847, the United States Army Corps of Engineers hired enslaved laborers. Between 1847 and 1860, approximately 17% of Key West's enslaved people were leased to the Corp as laborers. After the Emancipation Proclamation, the use of slave labor at the Fort was discontinued. The 82nd Colored Infantry, made up of Black soldiers from Louisiana, was stationed at Fort Jefferson at the end of the Civil War.

== Park history ==
Comprising 47,125 acres (73.6 sq mi; 190.7 km^{2}), Fort Jefferson National Monument was designated by President Franklin D. Roosevelt under the Antiquities Act on January 4, 1935. The monument was expanded in 1983 and redesignated as Dry Tortugas National Park on October 26, 1992, by an act of Congress. Dry Tortugas is managed together with Everglades National Park; they share a superintendent. The park was established to protect the island and marine ecosystems of the Dry Tortugas, to preserve Fort Jefferson and submerged cultural resources such as shipwrecks, and to allow for public access in a regulated manner.

During the United States federal government shutdowns of 1995–1996, Dry Tortugas was closed along with all other national parks. Seeing this as having a damaging effect on their tourism-dependent economy, the residents of Key West, Florida, raised money to keep Dry Tortugas open. The effort was inspired by the Smithsonian Institution, which raised private donations to keep its museums open during the shutdown.

Failing to find anybody to accept the money to reopen the park, Key West residents, under the auspices of the satirical micronation Conch Republic, sent a flotilla of civilian boats and fire department boats to Fort Jefferson in order to reopen the national park. When officials attempted to enter the fort, they were cited. The citation was contested in court the following year, and the resultant case, The United States of America v. Peter Anderson, was quickly dropped.

The park is a landing location for immigrants arriving from Cuba in homebuilt boats called "chugs". Receiving and housing the migrants is a particular problem for Dry Tortugas, which has limited resources for such arrivals and which is several hours from the nearest Coast Guard or Border Patrol units. Communications with Key West are accomplished using a satellite-based voice-over-IP system, which is prone to garbling and delays, and by a radio relay system using an abandoned Air Force tower between Key West and the Dry Tortugas.

Visitation steadily rose for several decades, reaching a peak of 83,704 in 2000. Since then visitation has slowly declined, with an average of about 63,000 per year in the period from 2007 to 2016.

In August 2004, the Dry Tortugas were directly struck by Hurricane Charley. The following day, a Cessna airplane crashed into the water near the islands, killing cinematographer Neal Fredericks while he was filming scenery for the feature film CrossBones. In September 2022, the islands were again directly struck by Hurricane Ian.

== Ecology ==
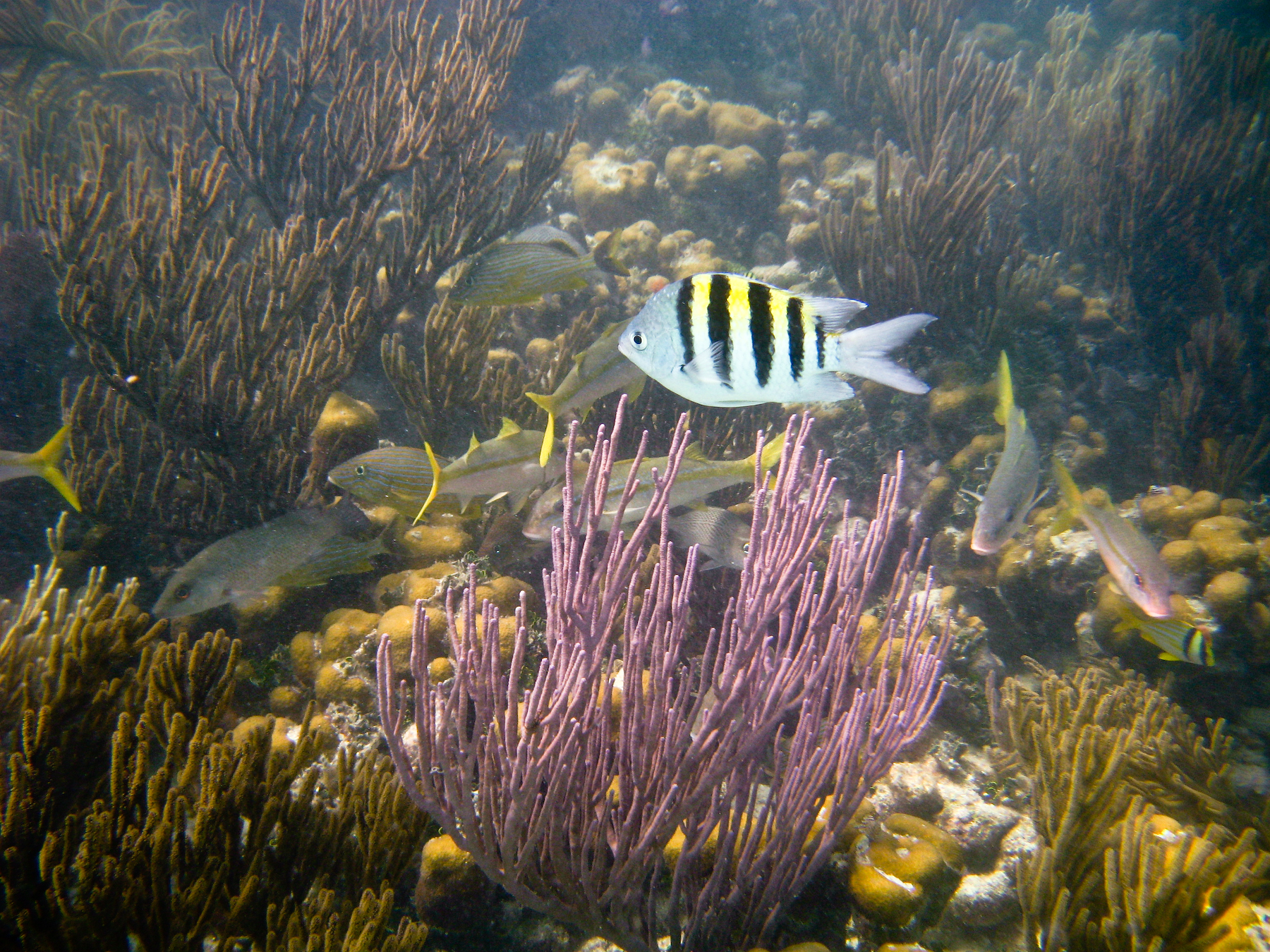
Coral and various fish including a striped species known as a sergeant major

The Dry Tortugas archipelago is classified as a borderline subtropical—tropical ecosystem, hosting species that do not normally breed in, and are not commonly found anywhere else within, the continental United States or the islands and waters surrounding it.

When the cold wave of January 1977 wiped out 96 percent of shallow-water branching coral, once extensive branching coral formations became rubble fields. The Dry Tortugas National Park now consists of patch reef and branching coral rubble.

=== Birds ===
Dry Tortugas National Park has an official bird list of 299 species. Of these, only eight species frequently nest within the park: sooty tern, brown noddy, brown pelican, magnificent frigatebird, masked booby, roseate tern, bridled tern and mourning dove. The park features the only nesting colonies of sooty tern, brown noddy, magnificent frigatebird, and masked booby in the contiguous United States.

Birdwatching activity peaks each spring (usually April) when dozens of migratory bird species can pass through the park in a single day. Many birds land inside the parade grounds of Fort Jefferson where they are often observed at close range. Common migratory warblers include the northern parula, American redstart, prairie warbler, hooded warbler, palm warbler, black-and-white warbler, common yellowthroat, yellow-rumped warbler, ovenbird, northern waterthrush, black-throated blue warbler, blackpoll warbler, and Cape May warbler, with more than 20 additional warbler species having shown up at least once. Several raptor species are often seen hunting songbirds. Each year several bird guides offer tours of Dry Tortugas National Park during April and early May when daily bird lists can often reach 100 or more species.

=== Invasive species and eradication efforts ===
An active eradication program has resulted in the removal of invasive Casuarina trees and agave from Loggerhead Key, by cutting and herbicide treatment. Pterois, commonly known as lionfish, have also been found in the park's waters and the National Park Service was reviewing (in 2015) the lionfish management plan to determine what actions to take to manage the spread of this invasive species in Dry Tortugas National Park and Everglades National Park.

== Visiting ==
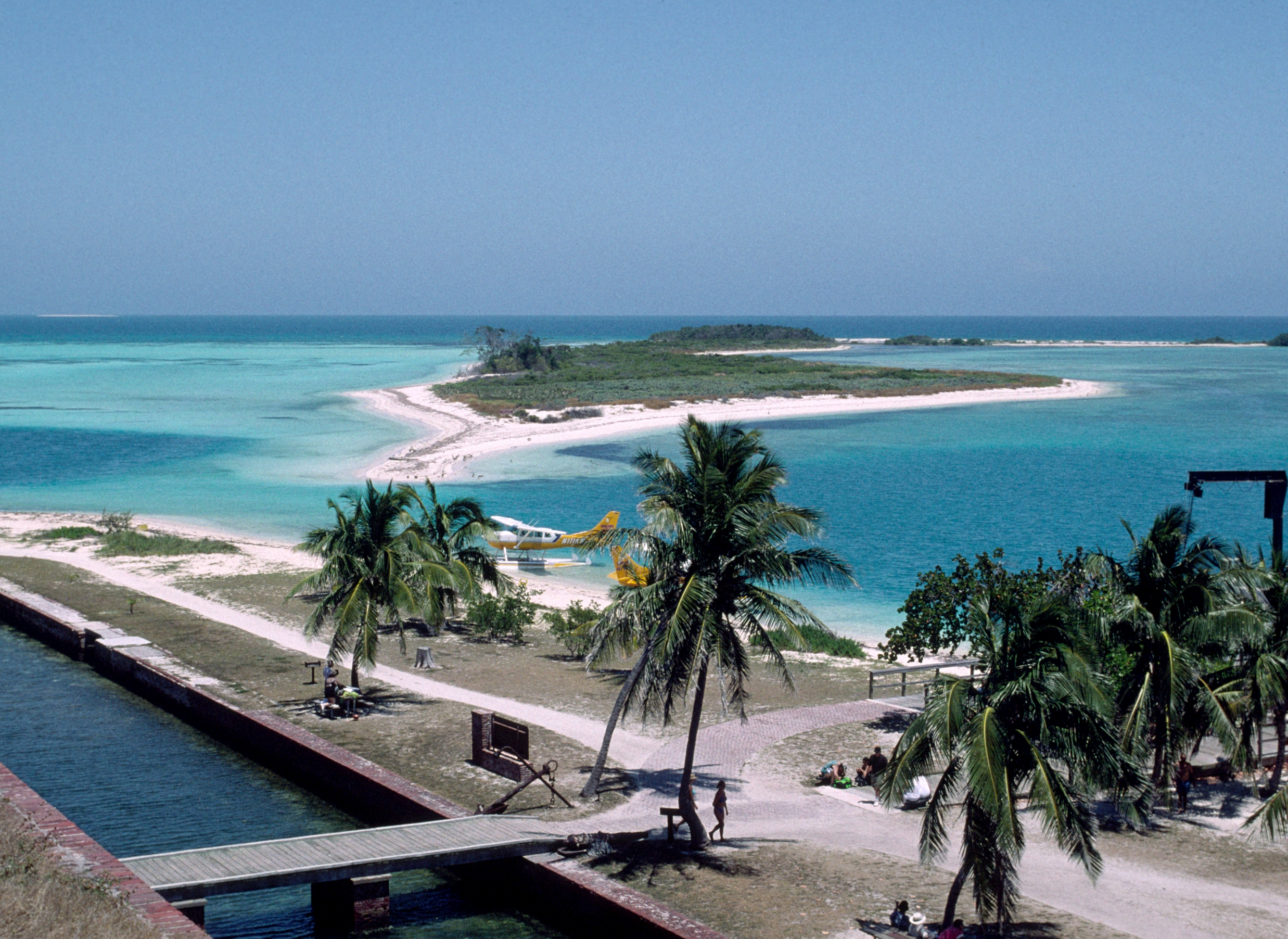

Most visitors arrive in Dry Tortugas National Park by either boat or seaplane from Key West. Official ferry and transportation services to the Dry Tortugas include the Yankee Freedom III catamaran, private vessel chartering and seaplane services. Other methods of visiting the Dry Tortugas include chartering of authorized and approved private vessels. There are no road connections to Dry Tortugas, and cars cannot access the islands.

Inside Dry Tortugas National Park the goods and services are limited. Visitors are required to bring the food, water and supplies they might need during their time in the park. The closest restaurants and hotels are located in Key West. However, primitive camping sites are available within Dry Tortugas on Garden Key.

== See also ==
- Florida Keys National Marine Sanctuary
- List of national parks of the United States
