= 12th Pennsylvania Infantry Regiment =

Union Army infantry regiment

12th Pennsylvania Volunteer Infantry
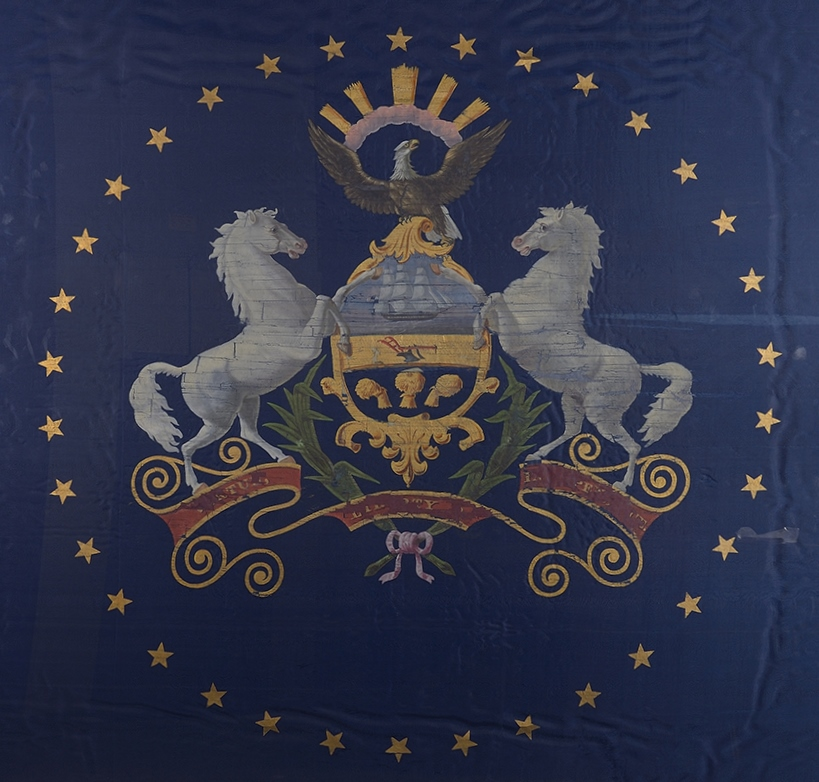
- State Flag of Pennsylvania, circa 1863.
- Active: 22 April–5 August 1861
- Country: United States
- Allegiance: Union
- Branch: United States Army; Union Army
- Type: Infantry
- Engagements: American Civil War

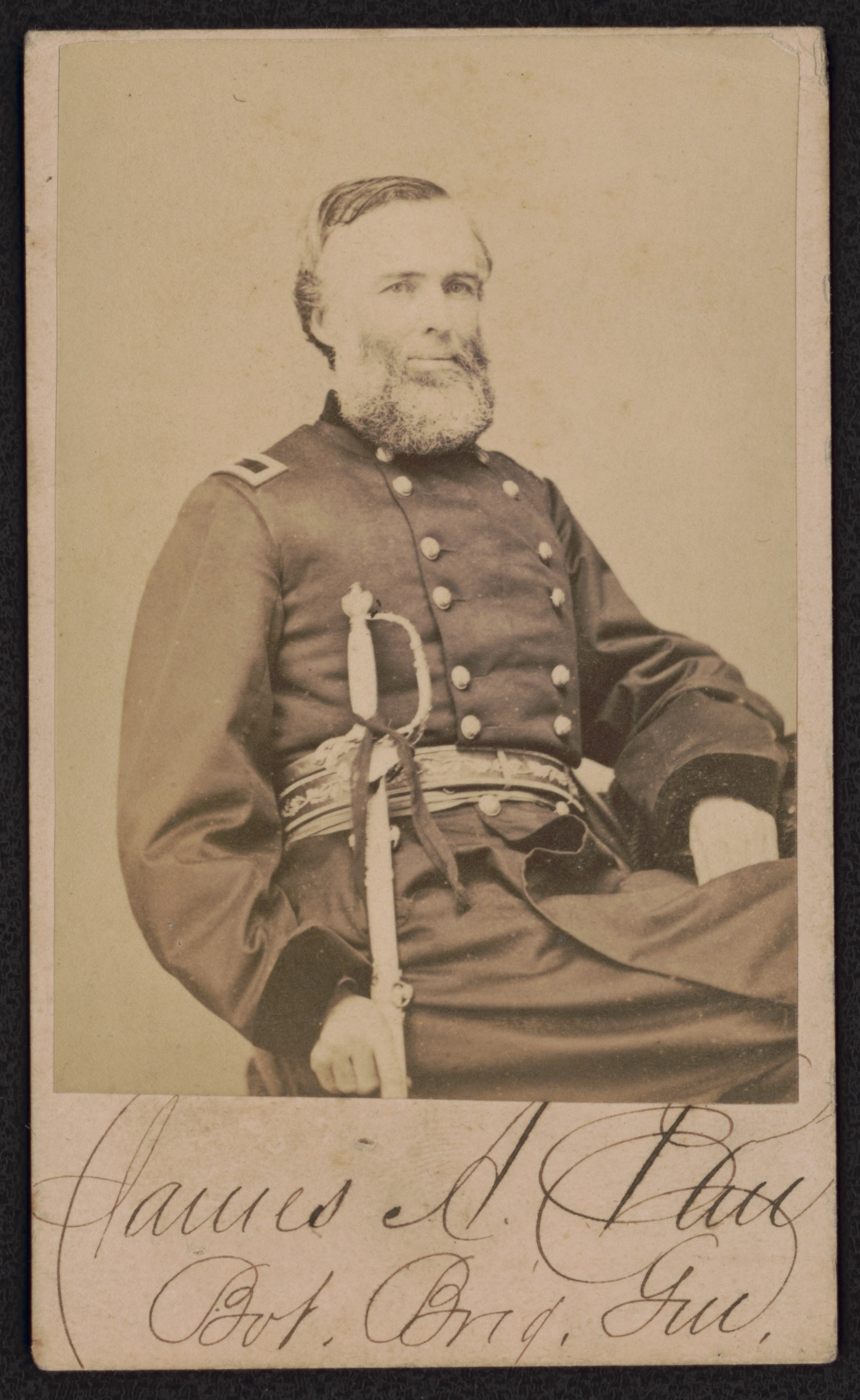
Brigadier General James A. Ekin of 12th Pennsylvania Infantry Regiment. From the Liljenquist Family Collection of Civil War Photographs, Prints and Photographs Division, Library of Congress

The 12th Regiment Pennsylvania Volunteer Infantry was an infantry regiment of the Union Army in the American Civil War. Raised in Pittsburgh and its surrounding counties in April 1861 for three months of service, the regiment spent its first month in training, then guarded the Northern Central Railway in Maryland until it was mustered out. Many of its men went on to serve in subsequent Pennsylvania regiments during the war.

== History ==
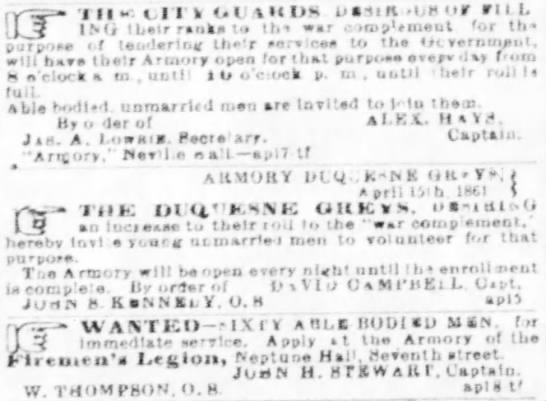
Newspaper recruitment notices for the City Guards, Duquesne Grays, and Firemen's Legion

The 12th Pennsylvania was raised in Pittsburgh in April 1861 for a three-month term in response to President Abraham Lincoln's call for 75,000 men, under the supervision of Brigadier General James S. Negley. It was organized in that city on 22 April when its field officers were elected, with David Campbell, former captain of the Duquesne Grays, becoming its colonel. The regiment was partially based on the preexisting Pittsburgh militia companies known as the Duquesne Grays (Company B) and Jackson Independent Blues (Company A), some of whose members were Mexican–American War veterans, and the recently established Zouave Cadets (Company I) and City Guards (Company K). The remaining companies were formed from inexperienced volunteers: Company E (Washington Invincibles) at Washington, Companies F (Lawrence Guards) and H (Lawrence Guards) at New Castle, Company G (Monongahela Artillery) at Monongahela City, and Companies C (Firemen Legion) and D (Union Guards) at Pittsburgh. The 12th became the first regiment to depart the city on 24 April and arrived at Harrisburg on the next day, being quartered in churches and the Pennsylvania State Capitol. It was reviewed by state Governor Andrew Gregg Curtin in the afternoon alongside the 13th Pennsylvania Infantry before being mustered into Federal service.

The regiment promptly entrained on the Northern Central Railway for Camp Scott near York, where it spent the next several weeks training. Conditions at Camp Scott, described by Samuel Penniman Bates' postwar official history as a "field of mud," made many of its men eager for action. The 12th received uniforms and equipment on 19 May, and relieved the 1st Pennsylvania Infantry along the Northern Central from the Pennsylvania–Maryland border to Baltimore on 25 May; the Northern Central provided an important connection between Harrisburg and points further north, Baltimore, and Washington, D.C. to the south. Regimental headquarters and Companies I and K were located at Cockeysville, while the remaining companies were spread out along the railroad; it was assigned to the 3rd Brigade of the 1st Division of Patterson's Army (the Department of Pennsylvania). Though the regiment had initially been thrilled at the news of its movement, it quickly found guarding the railroad monotonous, and desired action. The regiment did not train as a unit while guarding the railroad due to its dispersed positions, although Companies I and K conducted daily drill.

At the end of its term of service, the regiment was mustered out at Harrisburg on 5 August; it had suffered no losses during it service. Major Alexander Hays of the regiment eventually became a brigadier general and was killed at the Battle of the Wilderness, one of many officers and men of the regiment who saw further service in the Union Army during the war.

== Notable personnel ==
Regimental quartermaster James A. Ekin became a brevet brigadier general by the end of the war and served on the military tribunal that tried the Lincoln assassination conspirators. Private George K. Brady became an officer in the Regular Army and fought in the American Indian Wars. Private Charles Oliver of Company G later reenlisted in the 100th Pennsylvania Infantry and was awarded the Medal of Honor for his actions at the Battle of Fort Stedman in 1865, having served through most of the war. Company K Private Samuel Baldwin Marks Young served through the war as an officer and joined the Regular Army, ultimately becoming the first Chief of Staff of the United States Army. Another Company K Private, Joseph Barr Kiddoo, became an officer and rose to brevet brigadier general by the end of the war. Private Robert Patterson Hughes of Company E also joined the Regular Army postwar, holding command positions in the Philippine–American War. Jonas R. McClintock, the 8th mayor of Pittsburgh was the first captain of the Duquesne Grays.

== See also ==
- List of Pennsylvania Civil War regiments
- Pennsylvania in the Civil War
