= Reading Artillerists =

- Operated as: Reading Union Volunteers (October 1794), Reading Washington Guards (late 1794-early 1800s), Reading Washington Blues (1814), and Reading Artillerists (c. 1820-early 1900s)
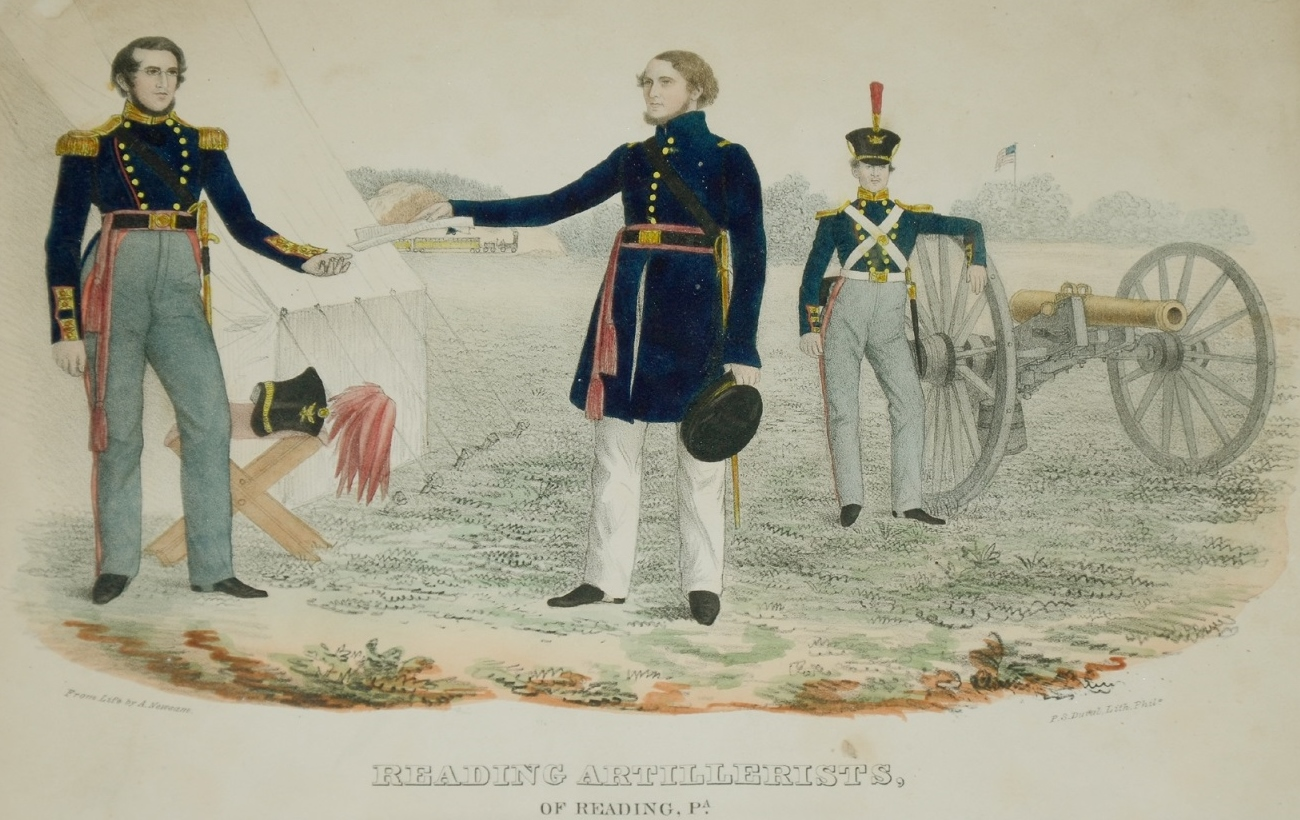
- Allegiance: United States
- Type: Local militia unit in Pennsylvania
- Size: 60-100
- Garrison/HQ: Reading, Pennsylvania, U.S. (Armory, 5th and Washington Streets, c. 1850s-1860s; Keystone Hall, Penn Street, c. 1888–1896)
- Anniversaries: Body guard for President George Washington (1794), Whiskey Rebellion (1794), Fries' Insurrection (1799), War of 1812 (1812–1815), Philadelphia Riots (July 1844), surrender of Vera Cruz (March 9, 1847), Battle of Cerro Gordo (April 18, 1847), Battle of Chapultepec (September 1847), Homestead labor strike (1892), Spanish–American War (1898), Anthracite Coal Strike (1902)
- Equipment: Uniform style changed from blue (c. late 1700s – early 1800s) to dark gray with yellow facings (c. 1830s–1850s) to blue (pre-1890s)

Commanders
- Commander (1794–1830): Capt. Daniel de Benneville Keim
- Commander (1844–1849): Capt. Thomas S. Leoser
- Commander (1857–1861): Capt. George Warren Alexander
- Commander (1862): Capt. William H. Andrews
- Commander (1862–1863): Capt. Thomas M. Richard
- Commander (1883): Capt. Samuel A. Stahr
- Commander (1885–1895): Capt. Henry J. Christoph
- Commander (1895–1899): Capt. Samuel Willits
- Commander (1905): Capt. H. Melvin Allen

The Reading Artillerists was a militia organization formed in Reading, Pennsylvania during the late 18th century. Mustering in for the first time during the presidential era of George Washington, members of this artillery unit went on to serve tours of duty in the War of 1812, Mexican–American War and, as members of the Union Army during the American Civil War, before later disbanding.

Having determined that Reading needed to improve its military readiness, civic leaders of the 1880s authorized the formation of a new artillery unit, and also chose to name it as "Reading Artillerists" in deference to the original unit's storied history. That militia unit then mustered in for the Spanish–American War, and continued its service during the early part of the 20th century.

== Founding ==
An 1859 Reading Times article, "A Condensed History of the Reading Artillerists", reported that the Reading Artillerists was founded in 1799 for the purpose of quelling the celebrated Whiskey Rebellion," but the exact founding date was half a decade earlier on March 23, 1794, according to Berks County historian Morton L. Montgomery.

Known as the Reading Union Volunteers when mustered in for the Whiskey Rebellion, this militia unit quickly gained a reputation for skill and dependability, as evidenced by its having been accorded the honor, just seven months after its founding, of serving as the escort for U.S. President George Washington. During George Washington's visit to Reading, on October 1, 1794, a parade was held in Washington's honor, "and the distinguished visitor reviewed the troops from the second story front window of the building over the doorway. The 'Reading Union Volunteers' participated in this military parade, and on the next day when President Washington continued his journey towards Carlisle, they accompanied him as an escort. While at Carlisle, they served as his body-guard...When they returned, the name of the Company was changed to 'Reading Washington Guards,'" according to Montgomery. The commanding officer of the unit at this time was 22-year-old Captain Daniel de Benneville Keim, a Reading native.

Mustering out after the rebellion's end, members of this unit continued to maintain their readiness as a functioning militia, and mustered in again formally as the Reading Washington Guards in 1799 in response to the Fries's Rebellion, which erupted when Congress attempted to tax house windows.

== War of 1812 ==
Just over a decade later, the Reading Washington Guards were called upon during the War of 1812. During this phase of duty, the group changed its name yet again, this time becoming the Reading Washington Blues sometime in or before October 1814.

Departing for Philadelphia by boat on the Schuylkill River on September 16, 1814, the unit helped defend the city from threatened invasions by British troops. When those threats lessened, the seventy-four militiamen from Reading were ordered to Camp Dupont near Wilmington, Delaware, where "they became a part of the 'Advance Light Brigade,' in the First Regiment of Pennsylvania Volunteer Infantry, which was under the command of General Cadwalader."

Ordered from Camp Dupont to Baltimore, they were assigned to artillery duty, and given charge of four brass, six-pound cannon, one of which they would bring home with them to Reading when they returned to the city. They were officially mustered out from service in March 1815.

Sometime between their service in Baltimore and 1820, the members of the unit opted to change their name again – this time to the Reading Artillerists. Keim was re-elected as the group's captain in 1820 with William Darling, Peter Aurand, and Peter Reitzel serving, respectively, as first, second, and third lieutenants. The unit strength at this time was ninety-eight.

== 1820s–1830s ==
In 1824, the Reading Artillerists were among the Pennsylvania soldiers who were on hand in Philadelphia to welcome the Marquis de Lafayette, the last living French general who fought beside George Washington during the American Revolution. Sometime after this, the unit's blue uniforms were exchanged for dark gray with yellow facings. On July 19, 1828, the unit's leadership adopted "a code of laws for the better government of the corps.

In 1830, the Artillerists' longtime commanding officer, Daniel Keim, ended his tenure of leadership. He was succeeded by his nephew, George May Keim, who served as captain from 1830 to 1834. A former manager of the Reading Library Company, George Keim later went on to become Colonel of the 53rd Pennsylvania and, in 1835, "Major-General of the Sixth Division," according to The Biographical Encyclopaedia of Pennsylvania.

Elected as captain by the group's membership in 1834, William H. Miller then served as commanding officer until 1839.

Before the decade was out, the Artillerists were bidding a sad, but fond farewell to their former leader. Following his passing on March 16, 1837, at the age of sixty-five, Daniel Keim was eulogized by the Democratic Press as someone with an "enviable reputation for honesty" and a "generous disposition," which "made him generally known as 'the poor man's stay and the soldier's friend."

== 1840s ==
In 1841, the organization's leadership changed again when Thomas S. Leoser was elected as captain and commanding officer in February. At their next meeting in March, members of the unit unanimously agreed "to adopt the full dress uniform of the United States Artillery," according to Montgomery.

Called up during the religious riots rocking Philadelphia in 1844, the Reading Artillerists guarded the Girard Bank and state arsenal there, and were attached to the First Battalion of the Reading Volunteers, along with the National Grays and Washington Grays.

Upon their honorable discharge in July 1844, Major-General Robert Patterson, commanding officer of the Pennsylvania Militia, described the Reading Artillerists and their fellow members of the First Battalion as "gallant and well-disciplined" men who exhibited "exemplary and soldier-like deportment," and thanked them for "their alacrity in reporting for duty."

== Mexican–American War ==
The day after Christmas in 1846, ninety Reading Artillerists headed off for what would be one of this militia unit's most challenging and dangerous duty assignments. Mustering in for federal service at Pittsburgh on January 5, 1847, they formed Company A of the 2nd Pennsylvania Infantry. Their officers included Captain Thomas S. Leoser, First Lieutenant William Wunder, and Second Lieutenants Levi P. Knerr and H. A. M. Filbert.

Transported by boat to New Orleans, Louisiana, they were stationed initially on the Island of Lobos in Mexico. Attached to the command of General Winfield Scott during the Mexican War, the Artillersts then engaged with their fellow 2nd Pennsylvania infantrymen in the Siege of Veracruz from March 9 to 29, fought in the Battle of Cerro Gordo on April 18, garrisoned Jalapa from May through mid-June, skirmished at the Pass of Latoeya June 20, and were also present at Contreras, Cherubusco, Perote, Puebla, and Tepeyahualco, as well as the Battle of Chapultepec. They were also on hand for action at the Gate of Belen and Citadel on September 13 and at the city of Mexico from September 14 to 15, 1847.

According to a 1915 Reading Times recap of the Artillerists' service during the war, "Col. John W. Geary in his report to General Winfield Scott after the taking of the city of Mexico stated that the Reading artillerists allowed no one to surpass them in the performance of duty and in crossing from Garita to the breast work of the citadel acted with great coolness in exposed positions." Thirty-nine casualties were incurred by the Reading Artillerists in Mexico.

Their tour of duty ended, the Reading Artillerists mustered out from the 2nd Pennsylvania on July 28, 1848, and returned home to their families. The next day, "they were given a brilliant reception by a military parade of eight hundred men, consisting of two companies of cavalry and eight companies of infantry," according to Montgomery.

== 1850s ==
As with prior peace-time periods, the Reading Artillerists' membership continued to fluctuate over the next several years. By 1855, the entire slate of officers had been replaced. Commanding the unit moving forward were Captain W. I. Clous, First Lieutenant W. W. Diehl, Second Lieutenants S. T. Ketterer and J. D. Hain. Their places were then filled on the November 2, 1857 by Captain George Warren Alexander, First Lieutenant W. H. Andrews, and Second Lieutenant H. R. Myers. Alexander would continue to lead the Reading Artillerists through the earliest days of America's Civil War.

== U.S. Civil War ==
Offering the services of his soldiers to President Abraham Lincoln and Pennsylvania Governor Andrew Curtin on April 16, 1861, in response to Lincoln's call for seventy-five thousand volunteers to defend Washington, D.C. following the fall of Fort Sumter to Confederate forces, Captain G. W. Alexander then oversaw the preparations of his militiamen as they readied their unit for what many hoped would be a short deployment. According to Berks County historian Arthur D. Graff, Rosa Nicolls presented a letter to Alexander "just as the company was departing for service" in which she advised him of her society's intention to support the Reading Artillerists and other local militia units in their efforts to protect the state and nation:

[A meeting of the Ladies Aid Society] was held here last evening for the purpose of furnishing clothing and other necessities to those in need of same. I am requested by the President to ... ask you to make it known to the members of your command. On receiving from you a statement of such articles ... as most wanted by some of your men, the ladies of the above Society will use every exertion to supply them as soon as possible.

On 20 April 1861, Alexander and his Reading Artillerists officially mustered at Harrisburg, Dauphin County with Company G of the 1st Pennsylvania Infantry. Primarily tasked with protecting several major roads used by Union Army troops, they also stood guard at vulnerable points along key railroad lines. After honorably completing their three months' service, they then mustered out at Harrisburg on July 23, 1861.

Alexander was then recommissioned as the second in command of the newly formed 47th Pennsylvania Infantry Regiment, which would become the only regiment from the Keystone State to fight in the Union's 1864 Red River Campaign across Louisiana. Wounded severely in both legs during the Battle of Sabine Cross Roads (Mansfield) on April 8, 1864, he recovered, and was honorably discharged in September 1864 upon expiration of this three-year term of service.

Most of Alexander's subordinates also re-enrolled for three-year terms of service, serving with different units until war's end. Several were wounded or killed in combat, including William H. Andrews who died during the Battle of Antietam on September 17, 1862.

== Post-Civil War ==
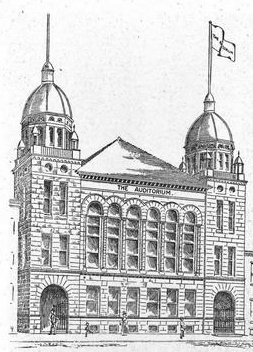
During the 1890s and early 1900s, Keystone Hall on Penn Street in Reading, Berks County, Pennsylvania served as the headquarters and armory of the Pennsylvania militia unit known as the Reading Artillerists (1897, public domain).

Following their honorable discharges from their respective Union Army regiments at the end of the U.S. Civil War, the Reading Artillerists returned home to Berks County. Their taste for military life soured by their long and difficult service, its members decided to disband.

Roughly fifteen years later, civic leaders determined that the city should have a more robust defense force and, in May 1881, created an entirely new militia unit, but chose to give it an historic name. According to The Reading Eagle:

Last evening the new military company of this city held a meeting and adopted the name of 'Reading Artillerists,' in honor of the organization of the same name that was one of the first military companies in this county after the revolution. The new company filed their bond in the sum of $1,000 yesterday and expect to receive their uniforms and arms shortly.

The same publication then announced in early December of that same year that the Artillerists were "having one of the rooms in their armory, second floor of Library hall, handomely furnished and equipped."

The carpet has already been laid. ... The room has been newly papered and a new gun rack erected. A beautiful cabinet desk has already been purchased. A novelty in the line of furniture will be introduced – upholstered camp stools, which are very comfortable. When completed, the room will present as handsome an appearance as any of the kind in the city.

In 1882, The Reading Eagle documented growing community support for the organization:

Among those present at the meeting held at the Reading Artillerists' armory, Fifth and Franklin Streets, last evening, for the purpose of forming a citizens' committee to give aid to the coming bazaar of the company to raise funds with which to build an armory, were Gen. Gregg, Mayor Rowe, P. R. Stetson, S. E. Ancona, Chester N. Farr, Henry M. Keim, Esq., Thomas Bohannon, T. D. Stichter, J. T. Valentine, A. K. Stauffer, and H. Willis Bland, Esq., Postmaster Grant, Dr. W. Murray Weidman, Andrew Shaaber, Capt. Savage and several officers and privates of the Artillerists. Gen. Gregg was called to the chair and Col. Farr was made secretary. The chairman stated the object of the meeting, spoke of the necessity of having an armory here, and said that, although the Artillerists were in their infancy, they had already won a record of which they could justly proud. He paid a high compliment to Capt. Savage, who is at the head of the company.

Per an 1883 Reading Times report, the reconstituted group chose Samuel Stahr as their new commanding officer. As membership grew, the new Reading Artillerists became a visible fixture in the community. During the summer of 1886, The Reading Eagle alerted readers to the group's plans for regular cannon training sessions:

The Reading Artillerists will have a target practice on their range at Bernhart's Crossing, next Thursday afternoon. Every week for some time they will have a practice. This is done for the purpose of having them qualify in the State National Guard. Capt. Christoph will recruit the Artillerists to the full quota, 63 men. At present he has 12 vacancies to fill and will accept that number of recruits.

In 1887, leaders of the Reading Artillerists purchased the former Metropolitan Bank building on South Sixth Street in Reading to use as their organization's headquarters and armory, and then contracted with a local architect, K. K. Moll, to make improvements to the structure, according to multiple Reading Times updates that year, including one which noted that the building would be "lighted by the Seibel gas enriching apparatus."

The redesign and remodeling of the building was done on such a large scale, in fact, that newspapers changed their references to the building from being located "on South Sixth street" to being "on Penn street above Seventh." Per the February 11, 1890 Reading Times, the Reading Artillerists also chose to rename the building as "Keystone Hall".

== Homestead strike ==
Before the century was over, the Reading Artillerists were asked, once again, to become part of a joint Pennsylvania militia force. This time they were called out in response to the massive 1892 labor uprising in western Pennsylvania known as the Homestead strike (or the Pinkerton Rebellion). The conflict began when the Carnegie Steel Company employed union-breaking tactics while negotiating a contract with the Amalgamated Association of Iron and Steel Workers, and union leaders responded by ordering a strike at the company's Homestead steel plant near Pittsburgh. The situation then deteriorated as workers at other plants also walked off their jobs in support. When violence erupted, the Reading Artillerists and other militia units were mobilized. Placed under state leadership, they quickly regained control of the plant, ended the strike, and returned home to their respective communities.

== 102nd Anniversary Celebration ==
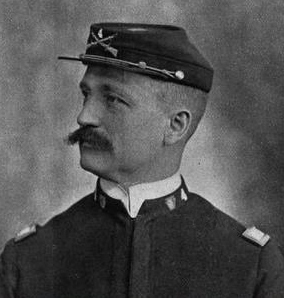
Head and shoulders view of Capt. Samuel Willits, commanding officer during the 1890s of the Reading Artillerists, a Pennsylvania militia unit based in Reading, Berks County (1896, public domain).

On Monday evening, May 26, 1896, the Reading Artillerists celebrated the unit's 102nd anniversary with pomp and joy at Metropolitan Hall in Reading, Berks County. Several hundred men and women were in the audience, according to historical accounts penned that same year. "The hall," wrote Morton Montgomery, "was beautifully and profusely decorated with the national flag in various sizes, and knapsacks, canteens, caps, accoutrements and various military insignia were arranged against the balconies and walls in a most pleasing manner." The Artillerists drilled before the crowd, which then listened to a musical program and Montgomery reading his history of the militia group. The commanding officer at the time was Captain Samuel Willits.

== Spanish–American War ==
Sometime around the mid-1890s, Captain Samuel Willits reorganized the Reading Artillerists yet again, this time preparing the men from Reading for state service as Company A of the Pennsylvania Infantry. The unit was then called up again in 1898 when President William McKinley issued his call for volunteers in the War with Spain. Arriving in Arroyo, Puerto Rico while U.S. gunboats were lobbing shells into the town, the men from Company A were assigned to outpost duty along the Patillo road. Ten days later, a peace accord was reached, and the unit was shipped home.

== Early 1900s ==
At the turn of the century, Company A of the Pennsylvania Infantry responded once again to a citizen uprising. This time, the artillerists helped calm tensions in Pennsylvania's coal regions as miners and their families pressed mine owners for better wages and working conditions, and were called upon specifically to help bring an end to the anthracite coal miners' strike of 1902.

In 1905, H. Melvin Allen was appointed as captain of the unit. J. Lewis Lengle and Edward V. Kestner served, respectively, as his first and second lieutenants.

The organization disbanded briefly again during this era, but was reinvigorated in 1917 when two former captains – Edward Machamer and H. Melvin Allen – reorganized the group.

== Commanding officers ==
Per Montgomery's Historical and Biographical Annals of Berks County, the full list of commanding officers for the Reading Artillerists was lengthy, and included these men:

- Capt. Daniel de Benneville Keim (1794–1830)
- Capt. George May Keim (1830–1834)
- Capt. William H. Miller (1834–1839)
- Capt. William Strong (1839–1844)
- Capt. Thomas S. Leoser (1844–1849)
- Capt. Marks John Biddle (1849–1850, 1852–1855)
- Capt. Daniel R. Clymer (1850–1852)
- Capt. William I. Clous (1855–1857)
- Capt. George Warren Alexander (1857–1861)
- Capt. William H. Andrews (1862)
- Capt. Thomas M. Richard (1862–1863)
- Capt. Robert H. Savage (1881–1882)
- Capt. William H. Souders (1882–1883)
- Capt. Samuel A. Stahr (1883–1885)
- Capt. Henry J. Christoph (1885–1895)
- Capt. Samuel Willits (1895–1899)
- Capt. Edward E. Machamer (1899–1902)
- Capt. Reuben C. Potteiger (1902–1905)
- Capt. H. Melvin Allen (1905–c. 1920s)
