= Camp Scott =

Camp Scott can refer to:

- Camp Scott (Massachusetts), a Civil War camp
- Camp Scott (Pennsylvania), a Civil War camp
