= Womelsdorf Historic District =

Historic district in Pennsylvania, United States

- U.S. National Register of Historic Places
- U.S. Historic district
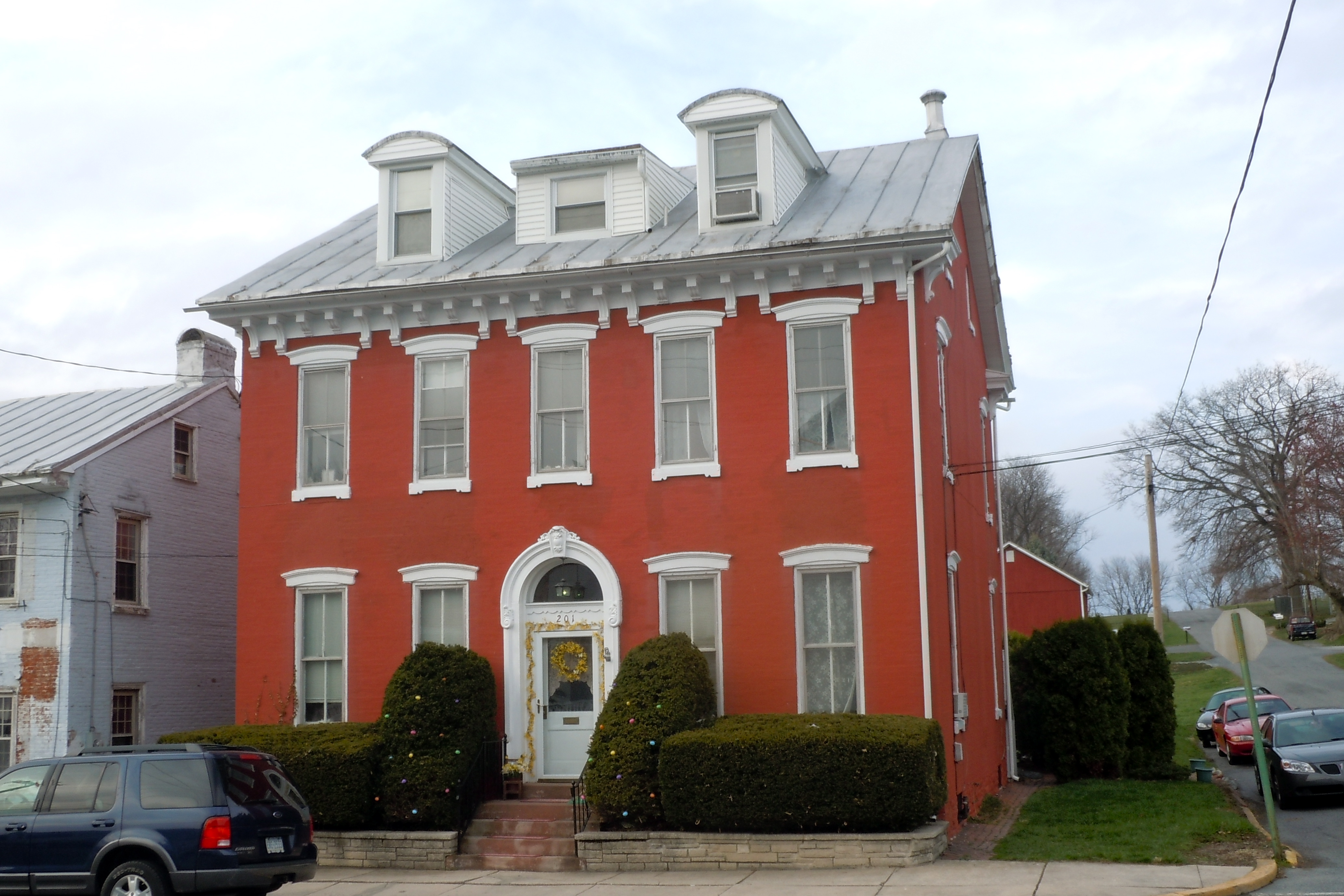
- House in the Womelsdorf Historic District, April 2011

- Location within Pennsylvania Location within the United States
- Location: Roughly bounded by Water, 4th, Franklin and Jefferson Sts., Womelsdorf, Pennsylvania
- Coordinates: 40°21′47″N 76°11′13″W
- Area: 7,052.3 acres (2,854.0 ha)
- Built: 1880
- Architect: Multiple
- Architectural style: Queen Anne, Italianate, Georgian
- NRHP reference No.: 82003764
- Added to NRHP: March 10, 1982

The Womelsdorf Historic District is a national historic district located in Womelsdorf, Berks County, Pennsylvania. It was listed on the National Register of Historic Places in 1982.

Encompassing 70,523 acres, this district is composed of 237 contributing buildings in the borough of Womelsdorf. These residential and commercial buildings were constructed in a variety of architectural styles, including Queen Anne, Italianate, and Georgian.

== History ==
Between 1723 and 1729, a group of immigrants from Germany who had initially made their homes in New York's Schoharie region, relocated to Berks County, Pennsylvania. Opting to settle in what was then known as the Tulpehocken Valley (a name which meant "Land of Turtles" in the language of the area's Native American residents), they became citizens of Middle Town when their community was renamed as such in 1762 by John Womelsdorf. The town's name was chosen by Womelsdorf as he laid out the town because the town was located roughly halfway between Reading and Lebanon. The first house was built that same year (1762) by Jacob Seltzer. Later converted into the tavern known as Stouch's Tavern, it was the oldest tavern operating in the county at the time that historian Morton L. Montgomery wrote his 1909 book, Historical and Biographical Annals of Berks County, Pennsylvania, and was still in operation as of late 2024.

Within a few years, the town had become a waypoint for travelers making their way not just between Lebanon and Reading, but to other larger cities across and beyond the Keystone State.

In 1774, the name of the town was changed to Womelsdorf in recognition of the leadership of John Womelsdorf. As the town's population and popularity as a place of respite for weary travelers continued to grow, the town also became a center of commerce, known for its grist mills, the manufacture of wool hats, hosiery and, most notably between 1875 and 1930, as a center for cigar manufacturing.

On November 13, 1793, George Washington, America's first president, traveled to Womelsdorf to inspect the progress being made on construction of the Union Canal. During his visit, he stayed in town at Stouch's Tavern. By 1833, when the town was officially incorporated as a borough, the population numbered 750.

=== Planning and establishment of the historic district ===
In preparation for their application for historic district status, planners proposed that the boundaries of their new Womelsdorf Historic District be "drawn to include structures of architectural or historic significance, as well as the lots upon which th[o]se structures [stood]." They also included gardens, garages, lawns, and old sheds which existed on the significant properties at the time.

The Womelsdorf Historic District was then officially listed on the National Register of Historic Places in 1982.

=== Later history ===
By the time the U.S. Census was conducted in 2000, the population had climbed to 2,599.

== Notable buildings ==
The Womelsdorf Historic District is made up of 237 buildings. These residential and commercial structures were built in a variety of architectural styles, including Queen Anne, Italianate, and Georgian.

Notable non-residential buildings include Stouch's Tavern (c. 1785), William Penn Hotel (1866), Conrad Weiser Inn (1897), and Brooklyn Hotel (c. 1877).
