= James W. Fuller Jr. =

James Wheeler Fuller Jr.
- Born: March 16, 1843; Catasauqua, Pennsylvania, United States
- Died: January 15, 1910; Catasauqua, Pennsylvania, United States
- Occupation(s): Founder of McKee, Fuller & Company
- Parent(s): James Wheeler Fuller Sr. and Clarissa (Miller) Fuller

James Wheeler Fuller Jr. (March 16, 1843 – January 15, 1910) was a former officer of the 47th Pennsylvania Infantry Regiment during the American Civil War who became an American industrialist known for manufacturing railroad axles and wheels. In 1910, he was described by his local newspaper, The Allentown Democrat, as "one of Catasauqua's most useful and enterprising citizens."

== Formative years ==
Fuller was born in Catasauqua, Pennsylvania on March 16, 1843, the second-oldest son of James Wheeler Fuller, Sr. and Clarissa (Miller) Fuller. He joined the military during the Civil War although he had not yet attained his majority. He later married Catherine Maria Thomas, from Beaver Meadow, Pennsylvania.

=== Civil War service ===
Fuller enrolled for military service in Catasauqua, Pennsylvania on August 21, 1861. He then officially mustered in for duty at Camp Curtin in Harrisburg on August 30, 1861 as a Sergeant with Company F, 47th Pennsylvania Infantry Regiment, under the command of Captain Henry S. Harte.

Following brief light infantry training, he was transported with the 47th Pennsylvania Volunteers by rail to Washington, D.C. Stationed at "Camp Kalorama" near Georgetown, they mustered into federal service with the Union Army on September 24, 1861.

On October 1 of that same year, he was elevated to the rank of first lieutenant and adjutant for the regiment. He held that position for just three months. According to James Franklin Lambert and Henry J. Reinhard in their A History of Catasauqua in Lehigh County, Pennsylvania, James W. Fuller Jr. "suffered a protracted illness, which overtook him during the first year of the Civil War in Virginia", and "was honorably discharged from the army and returned to his home."

== Lehigh Car, Wheel & Axle Works ==
In 1868, he organized the firm of McKee, Fuller & Company, proprietors of the Lehigh Car, Wheel & Axle Works. Beginnings of the plant had been made during the year preceding by Charles D. Fuller, an uncle and William R. Thomas. The capacity of the shop at this time was fifteen car wheels per day. The new firm at once commenced to enlarge the plant. They bought the defunct concern of Frederick & Company, built a forge and added an axle department. Since then the firm was known as the Lehigh Car, Wheel & Axle Works, and developed an enterprise of much benefit to the business prosperity of the community. So devoted was Mr. Fuller to his charge that he made daily trips to the works, personally superintended the mixing of irons for the casting of the wheels and made the rounds among his men in whose individual welfare he was vitally concerned.

He was president of the Catasauqua Manufacturing Company, a director in the Thomas Iron Company, the Wahnetah Silk Company, and the Ironton Railroad. At the time of his death he was vice-president of the Empire Steel and Iron Company (successor to the Lehigh Crane Iron Company) and a director in the Lehigh Foundry Company.

== Death and interment ==
Fuller suffered an episode of apoplexy and died at his home in Catasauqua on January 15, 1910, and was interred at the Fairview Cemetery in West Catasauqua.

== Legacy ==
The town of Fullerton, Pennsylvania was named in his honor.
