= Womelsdorf, Pennsylvania =

Borough in Pennsylvania, US

- Borough
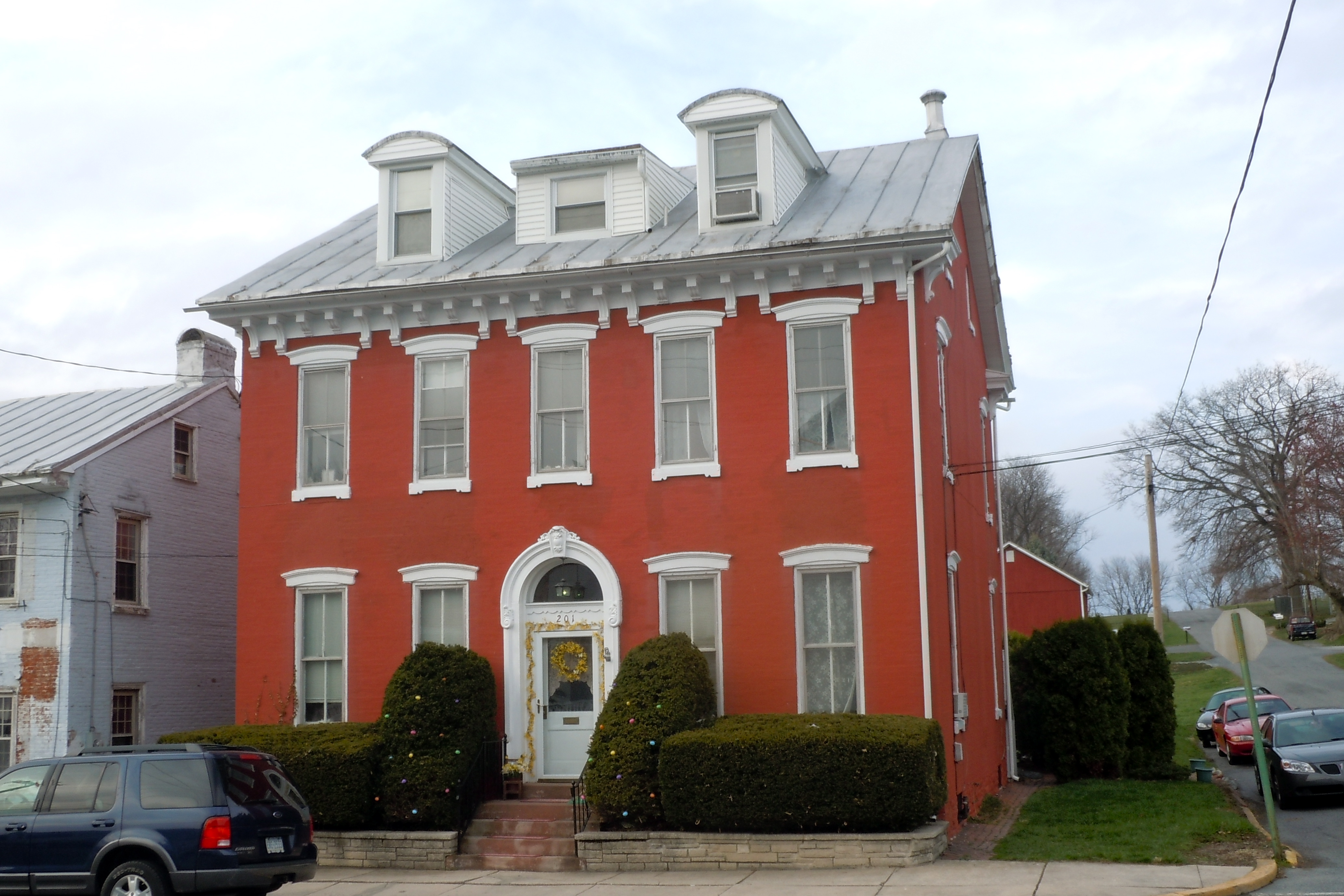
- House on Franklin Street

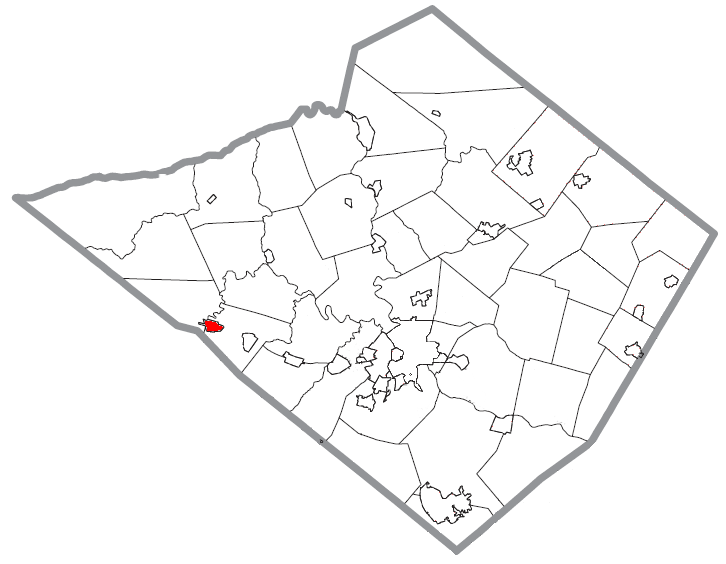
- Location in Berks County, Pennsylvania

- Location in Pennsylvania Location in the United States
- Coordinates: 40°21′55″N 76°11′16″W
- Country: United States
- State: Pennsylvania
- County: Berks

Area
  - Total: 0.87 sq mi (2.25 km^{2})
  - Land: 0.86 sq mi (2.24 km^{2})
  - Water: 0 sq mi (0.00 km^{2})
- Elevation: 449 ft (137 m)

Population (2020)
  - Total: 2,892
  - Estimate (2019): 2,907
  - Density: 3,355.0/sq mi (1,295.38/km^{2})
- Time zone: UTC-5 (EST)
  - Summer (DST): UTC-4 (EDT)
- ZIP code: 19567
- Area codes: 610 and 484
- FIPS code: 42-86056
- Website: www.womelsdorfborough.org

Womelsdorf is a borough in Berks County, Pennsylvania, United States. The population was 2,892 at the 2020 census. The main thoroughfares through Womelsdorf are High Street, which runs east–west, and Pennsylvania Route 419, which runs north–south. U.S. Route 422 runs along the northern edge of town.

== History ==
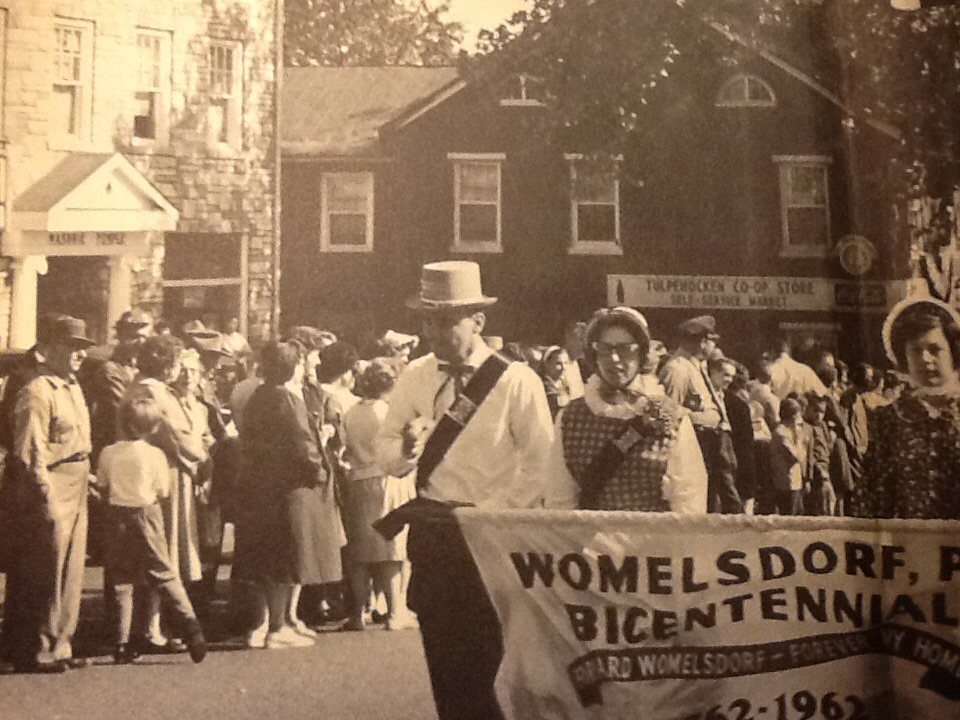
Womelsdorf Parade 1962.

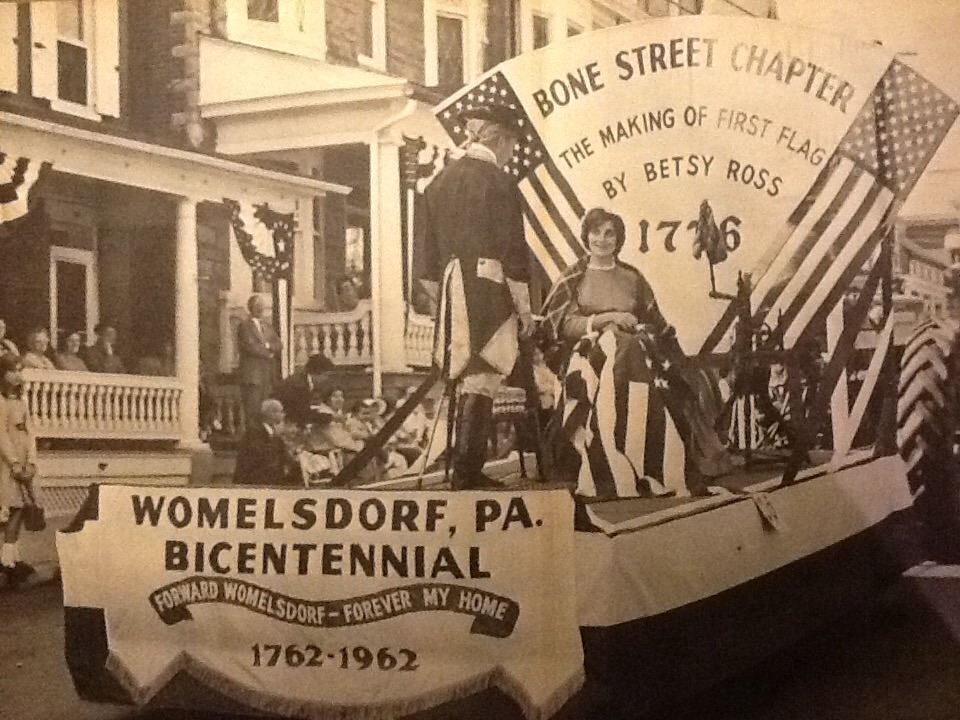
Womelsdorf parade 1962, Betsy Ross float.

The area had been occupied by Native American peoples before European colonization. German immigrant John Womelsdorf founded the community in 1762. It was originally named Middletown, as it was halfway between the cities of Lebanon and Reading, but roughly 50 years later the name was changed to Womelsdorf in honor of its founder.

Conrad Weiser, another German immigrant, settled here with his family as a young adult. Due to his importance as an interpreter and diplomat to the Iroquois and other Native American nations in the colonial period, the Conrad Weiser Homestead has been preserved as a Pennsylvania state historic site. It has materials to interpret his life and important aspects of 18th-century colonial Pennsylvania.

The Womelsdorf Historic District was listed on the National Register of Historic Places in 1982.

== Geography ==
Womelsdorf is located at 40°21′55″N 76°11′16″W (40.365201, -76.187815).

According to the United States Census Bureau, the borough has a total area of 0.9 square miles (2.3 km^{2}), all land.

== Demographics ==
Historical population
| Census | Pop. | Note | %± |
|---|---|---|---|
| 1840 | 849 | | — |
| 1850 | 947 | | 11.5% |
| 1860 | 1,076 | | 13.6% |
| 1870 | 1,031 | | −4.2% |
| 1880 | 1,097 | | 6.4% |
| 1890 | 1,141 | | 4.0% |
| 1900 | 1,136 | | −0.4% |
| 1910 | 1,301 | | 14.5% |
| 1920 | 1,331 | | 2.3% |
| 1930 | 1,484 | | 11.5% |
| 1940 | 1,450 | | −2.3% |
| 1950 | 1,549 | | 6.8% |
| 1960 | 1,471 | | −5.0% |
| 1970 | 1,551 | | 5.4% |
| 1980 | 1,827 | | 17.8% |
| 1990 | 2,270 | | 24.2% |
| 2000 | 2,599 | | 14.5% |
| 2010 | 2,810 | | 8.1% |
| 2020 | 2,892 | | 2.9% |

As of the census of 2000, there were 2,599 people, 1,061 households, and 691 families residing in the borough. The population density was 2,995.8 inhabitants per square mile (1,156.7/km^{2}). There were 1,112 housing units at an average density of 1,281.8 per square mile (494.9/km^{2}). The racial makeup of the borough was 96.46% White, 0.65% African American, 1.42% Asian, 0.96% from other races, and 0.50% from two or more races. Hispanic or Latino of any race were 2.19% of the population.

There were 1,061 households, of which 31.4% had children under the age of 18 living with them, 52.5% were married couples living together, 8.7% had a female householder with no husband present, and 34.8% were non-families. 28.5% of all households consisted of individuals, and 12.4% had someone living alone who was 65 years of age or older. The average household size was 2.41 and the average family size was 2.98.

In the borough the population was spread out, with 24.3% under the age of 18, 6.4% from 18 to 24, 32.7% from 25 to 44, 20.5% from 45 to 64, and 16.1% who were 65 years of age or older. The median age was 37 years. For every 100 females there were 96.9 males. For every 100 females age 18 and over, there were 92.0 males.

The median income for a household in the borough was $45,082, and the median income for a family was $53,456. Males had a median income of $38,309 versus $24,514 for females. The per capita income for the borough was $22,133. About 2.2% of families and 5.9% of the population were below the poverty line, including 5.5% of those under age 18 and 9.5% of those age 65 or over.

== Notable people ==
- George Nicholas Eckert (1802–1865), American politician, U.S. Congressman
- Conrad Weiser, 1696–1760, built his homestead just outside what is now the borough limits
- James Slough Zerbe (1849–1921) American inventor, early airplane designer

== Attractions ==
Womelsdorf is home to the Stouch Tavern. Dating to 1785, the Stouch Tavern is locally famous for having been visited by President George Washington while he was serving his first term as leader of the new United States. Washington spent one night at the tavern in 1793 as he traveled from Reading to Lancaster.

== Transportation ==
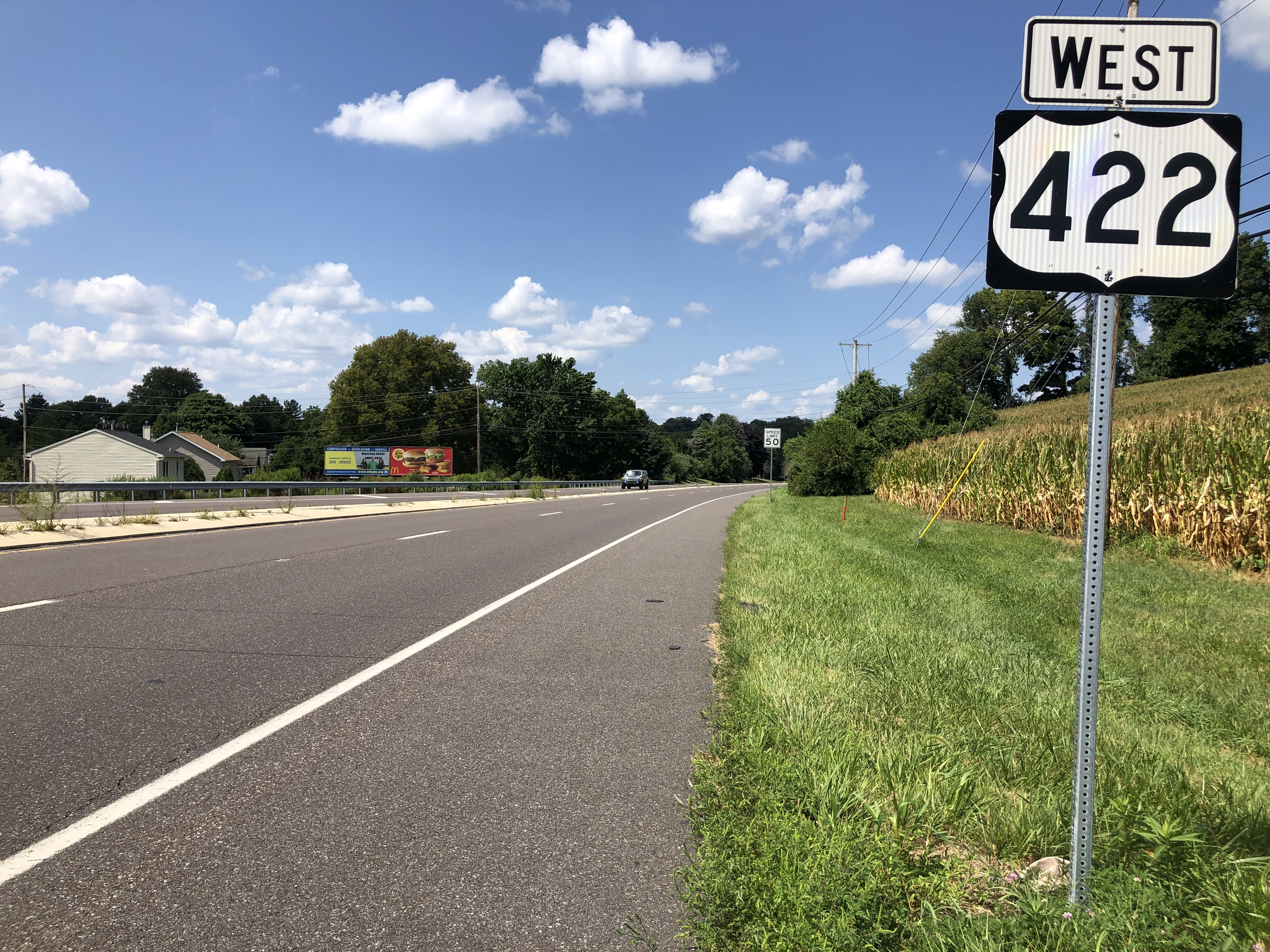
US 422 westbound in Womelsdorf

As of 2007, there were 10.66 miles (17.16 km) of public roads in Womelsdorf, of which 3.06 miles (4.92 km) were maintained by the Pennsylvania Department of Transportation (PennDOT) and 7.60 miles (12.23 km) were maintained by the borough.

U.S. Route 422 and Pennsylvania Route 419 are the numbered highways serving Womelsdorf. US 422 follows Conrad Weiser Parkway along a northwest-to-southeast alignment through the northeastern portion of the borough. PA 419 follows Second Street, High Street and Third Street along a north-south alignment through the center of the borough.
