= George Warren Alexander =

- Born: May 9, 1829; Derry, New Hampshire, U.S.
- Died: May 5, 1903 (aged 73); Reading, Pennsylvania, U.S.
- Resting place: Charles Evans Cemetery
- Other name: G. W. Alexander
- Occupations: Founder and operator, G. W. Alexander & Co., a successful hat factory in Berks County, Pennsylvania
- Known for: Military service with the Reading Artillerists (captain); 1st Pennsylvania Infantry (captain, Company G); 47th Pennsylvania Infantry Regiment (lieutenant colonel and second in command)
- Spouse: Harriet N. Appleton

George Warren Alexander (1829-1903) was a New Hampshire native who made significant contributions to the communities of Reading and West Reading in Berks County, Pennsylvania, from the mid-1800s to the early 1900s.

Initially trained in factory operations at a cotton mill in Holyoke, Massachusetts during the early 1850s, he accepted a new manufacturing position in Berks County shortly thereafter. It was during that period of his life that he began his association with the volunteer militia of Pennsylvania when he joined, and was subsequently appointed captain of, the Reading Artillerists—a role that would later prompt his appointments to leadership roles with the 1st Pennsylvania Infantry Regiment and the 47th Pennsylvania Infantry Regiment during the American Civil War.

Post-war, he founded and managed G.W. Alexander & Co., a successful hat manufacturing company in Berks County.

== Early life and education ==
Alexander was born on May 9, 1829, the son of Philip C. and Mary Ann (Taylor) Alexander. He was known throughout most of his life as "G.W." His entry on a Massachusetts marriage ledger documents his place of birth as Derry, New Hampshire.

By September 1850, Alexander had relocated to Holyoke, Massachusetts, where he resided with his parents and six sisters: Elvina, Rosette, Sarah, Merriam, Lois, and Dorothy. Also residing with the family in 1850 was his future wife, Harriet N. Appleton, a daughter of Robert and Jane Appleton. Sometime after their marriage in Holyoke, Massachusetts on September 10, 1851, G.W. and Harriet Alexander relocated to Reading, Pennsylvania.

== Military service ==
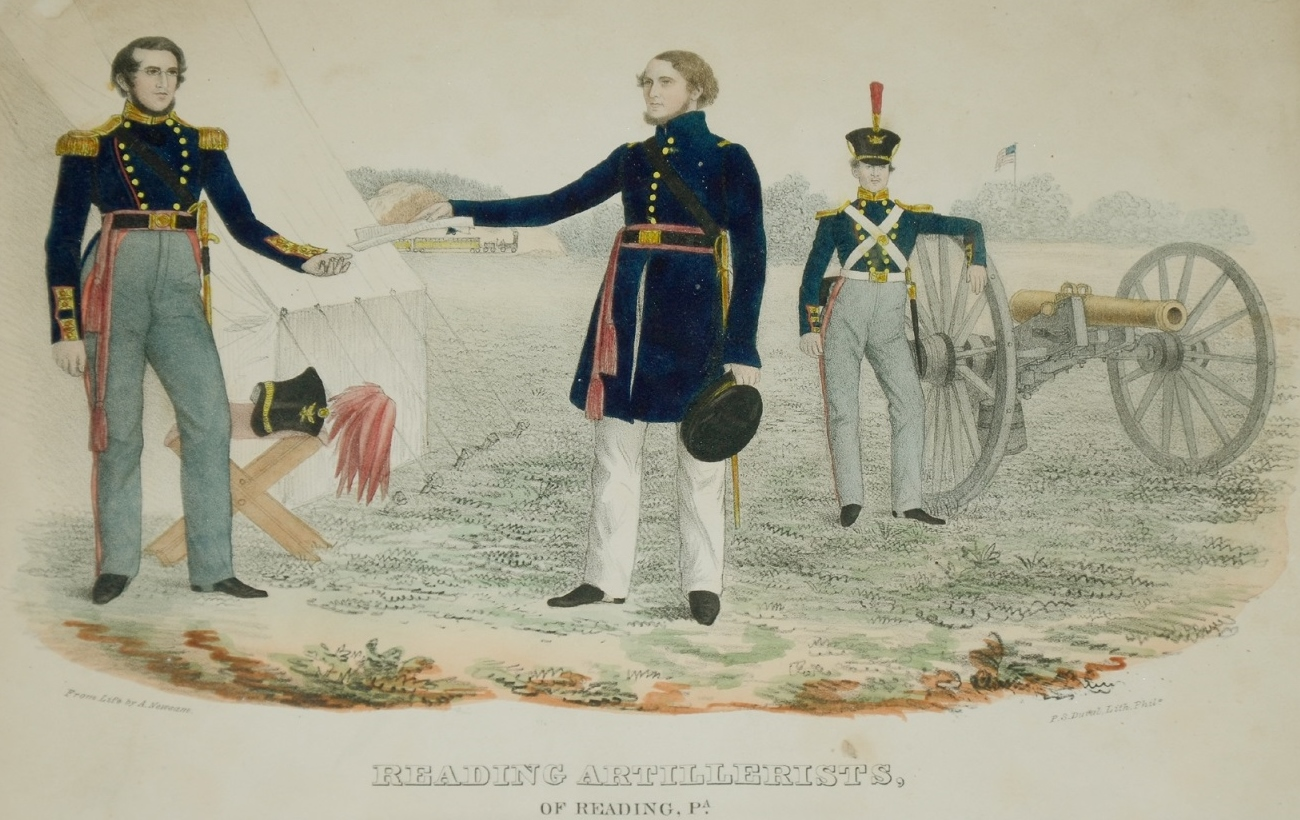
The Reading Artillerists' uniform styles changed from blue in the late 1700s to dark gray with yellow facings sometime between the 1830s and 1850s, and then to blue at some later point as depicted in this 1841 Albert Newsam illustration

Shortly after Alexander's arrival in Berks County, he joined the Reading Artillerists, and was appointed captain of that local militia group in 1857. The Artillerists had a distinguished history, including being assigned as the body guard to U.S. President George Washington in 1794, only seven months into the unit's founding, helping to end the Whiskey Rebellion in 1799, serving during the War of 1812, and fighting in the Mexican–American War under General Winfield Scott. A notice in the September 12, 1861, edition of the Reading Times confirmed his status as commanding officer:

Reading Artillerists, Attention!

You will meet this evening at 7 o’clock, at the Armory, 5th and Washington sts., for the purpose of transacting important business. Punctual attendance is requested.

By order,
WM. MCNALL, O.S.

G. W. ALEXANDER,

Captain.

=== Civil War ===
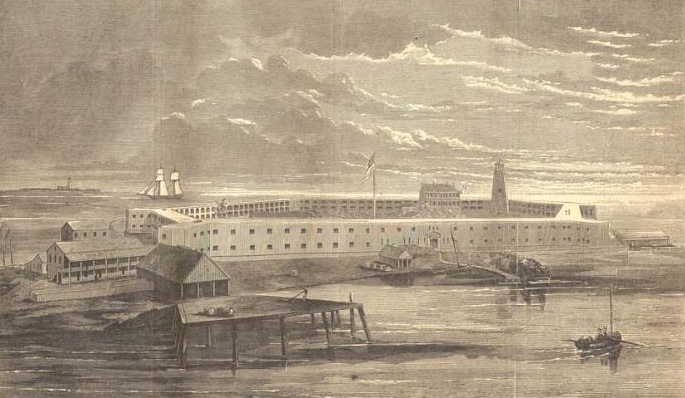
Fort Jefferson in Dry Torgas, Florida as depicted in the August 26, 1865 edition of Harper's Weekly

In response to President Abraham Lincoln's April 1861 call for 75,000 volunteer troops to defend the national capital of Washington, D.C., following the fall of Fort Sumter to Confederate forces, Alexander enrolled for military service in Reading at the age of 31. Commissioned a captain, he mustered in for duty with Company G of the 1st Pennsylvania Infantry Regiment in Harrisburg on April 20, 1861. Regimental assignments during this three-month period often involved guard duty along key transportation points, including railroads and main roads used by Union Army troops, and the occupation of Martinsburg, Virginia, and other towns in Maryland and Virginia. Following the honorable completion of their service, Alexander and his fellow 1st Pennsylvania Volunteers mustered out at Camp Curtin in Harrisburg on July 23, 1861.

Alexander then re-enrolled at Camp Curtin on August 5, 1861, for a three-year term of service. Commissioned at the age of 32 as a lieutenant colonel with the newly formed 47th Pennsylvania Infantry Regiment, he mustered in as the regiment's second in command on September 24 at Washington, D.C., at the 47th's encampment at Camp Kalorama on the Kalorama Heights near Georgetown, roughly two miles from the White House. That same day, the 47th Pennsylvania Volunteers were officially mustered into federal service with the U.S. Army.

Initially assigned to contribute to the defense of the national capital in Washington, D.C., the 47th Pennsylvania Volunteers were later sent to Florida at the end of January 1862. Arriving in Key West in February, they were assigned to garrison duties at Fort Taylor. From October 1-3, Alexander and his men participated in the capture of Saint John's Bluff in Florida. The regiment then suffered a significant number of casualties during the Battle of Pocotaligo in South Carolina, which was fought between October 21 and October 23, 1862. Two officers and 18 enlisted men died; an additional two officers and 114 enlisted men were wounded in action.

Ordered back to Fort Taylor on November 15, 1862, the 47th Pennsylvania Volunteers became a divided regiment on December 22 when Alexander was ordered to take the men from Companies D, F, H, and K to the remote Dry Tortugas off the coast of Florida, where they were assigned to garrison Fort Jefferson. Alexander and his men remained there in this capacity until rejoining the remainder of the regiment in Key West in February 1864.

Ordered west to join Union Major-General Nathaniel Banks' forces, the 47th Pennsylvania departed from Florida via steamship in late February 1864, becoming the only regiment from the Keystone State to fight in the Union's 1864 Red River Campaign across Louisiana. During the 47th's first major combat action there – the Battle of Sabine Cross Roads (Mansfield) on April 8, 1864 – Alexander was severely wounded in both legs.

Although he officially mustered out from the 47th Pennsylvania Volunteers on September 23, 1864 upon expiration of his three-year term of service, Alexander was reported by the Reading Times in its September 20, 1864 edition to have returned home sooner:

HOME. – Col. G. W. Alexander of the 47th P.V., arrived home on Saturday, after a protracted absence, during which he has seen much service. His many friends will be glad to hear that he is well and hearty.

== Civilian life and the Alexander Hat Company ==
In 1867, Alexander was confirmed by the U.S. Congress as U.S. Assessor of the Internal Revenue for the agency's district, which included the city of Reading. A year later, he became the subject of an investigation by the federal Treasury Department, and was put on trial in December for abusing his position by allegedly aiding others with the removal and concealment of whiskey in order to avoid paying taxes.

The December 5, 1868, edition of The Evening Telegraph in Philadelphia noted that, after Alexander was convicted, Judge George Cadwalader (a former Union Army general during the Civil War) asked the jury to recommend mercy; the jury subsequently sentenced Alexander to three years in prison.

After serving his time, Alexander resumed life with his family in Reading; by 1880, he had relocated with his wife and children to West Reading, and had launched G.W. Alexander & Co., a hat factory which thrived, expanded to a work force of 300, and continued to be successful even after a fire forced him to rebuild a decade later. According to the Reading Eagle:

Alexander & Co.'s hat factory is one of the principal industrial establishments and a most interesting place to visit. The firm is engaged in manufacturing fur hats and its plant is equipped with all the latest improved machinery put in at great expense. Forty hands are employed and excellent wages are made by the employees. The venture made by the firm in entering the fur hat trade is already a success and they contemplate an increase of their factory so as to probably employ 100 men in all.

The article went on to add that, "West Reading is illuminated now, through the joint efforts of Col. Alexander, J. G. Yarnell and Daniel Moser, who formed a company for this purpose, and lamp posts, on which coal oil lamps are placed, are located all over the place, and the service is very satisfactory to all."

== Death and interment ==
G.W. Alexander died in Reading on May 5, 1903, and was interred at the Charles Evans Cemetery in that city with his wife and two of his daughters, Sallie and Nettie, who had predeceased him. His passing was reported in newspapers statewide, including in Allentown and Reading.

== External resources ==
- 47th Pennsylvania Volunteers: One Civil War Regiment's Story.
- Charles Evans Cemetery (cemetery where George Warren Alexander was buried).
- *Hardee, William Joseph. Hardee’s Rifle and Light Infantry Tactics. Memphis, Tennessee: E.C. Kirk & Co., 1861.
- Rosters, 47th Pennsylvania Volunteers, in Registers of Pennsylvania Volunteers, 1861-1865, Vol. 3: 40th-52nd Regiments (3 Years Service), Series #19.65, Record Group 19, Records of the Department of Military and Veterans' Affairs, Pennsylvania State Archives.
