= 1st Pennsylvania Infantry Regiment =

Union Army infantry regiment

1st Pennsylvania Volunteer Infantry
- Pennsylvania flag
- Active: April 20 – July 27, 1861
- Country: United States
- Allegiance: Union
- Branch: United States Army; Union Army
- Type: Infantry
- Engagements: American Civil War

The 1st Pennsylvania Infantry was an infantry regiment in the Union Army during the American Civil War that served for three months at the beginning of the war.

== History ==
On April 13, 1861, Northampton County residents held a public meeting at Easton to discuss the secession of southern states from the United States of America. Several in attendance, including Charles Heckman and Captain Samuel Yohe, began recruiting local militia members and other volunteers willing to support and protect the federal government. Yohe, the owner-operator of a local distillery, mill and store, previously served his community as an associate judge, county treasurer and prothonotary, as well as the commanding officer of the Washington Grays, an Easton-based militia unit. Two days later, when President Abraham Lincoln issued his call for 75,000 volunteers to defend Washington, D.C., community leaders in Easton and neighboring cities offered the services of the local residents they had begun recruiting. Three days later, these volunteers left their respective cities and headed for Dauphin County, where they mustered in at Camp Curtin, a military training camp on Agricultural Society land in northern Harrisburg.

On April 20, the 1st Pennsylvania Regiment was officially organized at the camp with Yohe commissioned as colonel and appointed commanding officer. The Washington Grays were designated as Company C while the men recruited by Heckman were assigned to company D. Commissioned as captain, Heckman was then placed in charge of that unit.

Lehigh County native Tilghman H. Good, commanding officer of the Allen rifles, a highly regarded militia unit based in Allentown, was named lieutenant colonel and second in command of the regiment. During the summer of 1861, as the war intensified, Good went on to establish another new regiment, the 47th Pennsylvania Infantry Regiment. George Warren Alexander, the captain of the Reading Artillerists who later became Good's second in command with the 47th Pennsylvania, and William H. Gausler, the captain of the Jordan Artillerists from Allentown, who also later joined the 47th Pennsylvania, were placed in charge of their recruits as they were assigned, respectively, to the 1st Pennsylvania's Company G and I. Also commissioned as officers on the regimental command staff were Thomas W. Lynn (major) and James W. Militmore (adjutant). The regimental band, composed of musicians from the city of Lancaster, was led by Daniel Clemens.

That evening, after being equipped with muskets and twelve rounds of ball cartridge, haversacks and food rations (bacon and hard tack) and placed under the command of Brigadier General George C. Wynkoop, the members of the 1st Pennsylvania marched to Harrisburg's train station and boarded Northern Central rail cars. Transported to Maryland, they disembarked near Cockeysville. Within short order, they were pulled back to York, Pennsylvania, where they trained at Camp Scott until May 14. At this point, they were assigned to guard the Northern Central Railroad from Pennsylvania to Druid Park in Baltimore, Maryland. The regiment was ordered to Catonsville, Maryland and then onward on May 25, once again assigned to guard duty protecting roads leading to Harpers Ferry and the cities of Frederick and Franklintown.

Transported back to Pennsylvania on June 3, the regiment underwent additional training at Chambersburg before reassignment to the 2nd Brigade of the 2nd Division of the Army of the Shenandoah commanded by General Robert Patterson. Ordered back to Maryland, the regiment moved between Hagerstown, Funkstown and Williamsport before occupying Frederick from June 22, where they continued to drill until receiving orders two weeks later to head for Martinsburg, Virginia. Moving through Boonsboro and Williamsport, the 1st Pennsylvanians forded the Potomac River, advancing toward Falling Waters and then reaching Martinsburg.

Yohe and his 1st Pennsylvanians were ordered to assume garrison duty in the vicinity of Martinsburg by army Assistant Adjutant General Fitz John Porter on July 8, in order to protect Union supplies and railroad lines. They remained there when the remainder of Patterson's army moved on to Bunker Hill on July 14. Two days later, they rejoined the army at Charlestown. Ordered to Harpers Ferry on July 21, the 1st Pennsylvania Volunteers marched to Sandy Hook, boarded train cars to return to Harrisburg on the evening of July 23, where they were honorably discharged. Many then promptly chose to re-enlist for three-year terms of service.

According to official historian Samuel P. Bates, "During the time that the regiment was in service, it did not participate in any battles; but its timely arrival in the field accomplished much good by checking any rash movement on the part of Rebels in arms along our borders. The duties it was called upon to perform were faithfully done, and its good conduct, under all circumstances, was appreciated and acknowledged by its superior officers."

== Organization ==
Per historian Samuel P. Bates, based on information taken from muster rolls throughout the regiment's tenure of service, the officers serving with the 1st Pennsylvania's central command and in command of its individual companies were:

- Field and Staff Officers: Samuel Yohe, colonel; Tilghman H. Good, lieutenant colonel; Thomas W. Lynn, major; James Miltimore, adjutant; Frederick S. Pyfer, quartermaster; Jacob R. Ludlow, surgeon; and W.H.H. Michler, surgeon.
- Company A: Recruited at Bethlehem, Northampton County; mustered in April 20, 1861; James L. Selfridge, captain;
- Company B: Recruited at Easton, Northampton County; mustered in April 20, 1861; Jacob Dachrodt, captain;
- Company C: Recruited at Easton, Northampton County; mustered in April 20, 1861; William H. Armstrong, captain;
- Company D: Recruited at Easton, Northampton County; mustered in April 20, 1861; Charles Heckman, captain;
- Company E: Recruited at Harrisburg, Dauphin County; mustered in April 18, 1861; Jacob M. Eyster, captain;
- Company F: Recruited at Lancaster, Lancaster County; mustered in April 20, 1861; Emlen Franklin, captain;
- Company G: Recruited at Reading, Berks County; mustered in April 20, 1861; George Warren Alexander, captain;
- Company H: Recruited at Easton, Northampton County; mustered in April 21, 1861; Ferdinand W. Bell, captain;
- Company I: Recruited at Allentown, Lehigh County; mustered in April 20, 1861; William H. Gausler, captain;
- Company K: Recruited at Lancaster, Lancaster County; mustered in April 20, 1861; Henry A. Hambright, captain; and
- Regimental Band: Recruited at Lancaster, Lancaster County; led by Daniel Clemens. Members: Adams, Benjamin F. and Jacob; Bruederly, George P. and Joseph A.; Chambers, John; Cogley, Joseph M.; Hepting, Charles; Myers, George G.; Newmyer, Herman; Norbeck, Jacob H.; Rote, George F.; Shenck, Henry; Shindle, John P.; Stretch, Charles; and Frederick Wettig.

== See also ==
- List of Pennsylvania Civil War Units

== External resources ==
- Civil War Veterans' Card File, 1861-1866. Harrisburg: Pennsylvania State Archives.
- "Colonel Samuel Yohe" (obituary). Easton, Pennsylvania: Easton Express, July 6, 1880.
- "Pennsylvania in the Civil War." PA-Roots, retrieved online July 1, 2018.
- Registers of Pennsylvania Volunteers, 1861-1865, vol. 1: 1st-25th Regiments (3 months' service, April–May 1861). Harrisburg: Pennsylvania State Archives.
- Soldiers and Sailors Database. Washington, D.C.: U.S. National Park Service.
