= Morton L. Montgomery =

American lawyer, historian and author

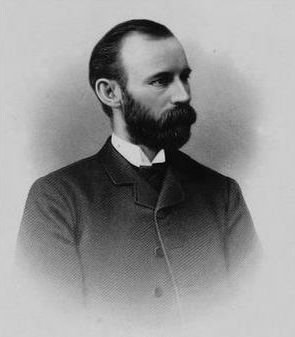
- An 1886 illustration of Montgomery
- Born: Morton Luther Montgomery; November 10, 1846; Reading, Pennsylvania, U.S.
- Died: 1933 (aged 86–87); Allentown, Pennsylvania, U.S.
- Occupation(s): Attorney, historian, and author
- Spouse: Frances (Baugh) Montgomery (m. 1875-1914; her death)
- Parent(s): Johan Leonard Montgomery (1812–1880), Catharina (Rush) Montgomery (1809–1865)

Morton Luther Montgomery (1846–1933) was a native of Pennsylvania and a lawyer who became a military and public historian and author of more than a dozen books, lecture-related content, and other materials documenting the history of Pennsylvania from its earliest days through the early part of the 20th century.

== Early life and education ==
Montgomery was born on November 10, 1846, in Reading, Pennsylvania, and christened three days later at that city’s Trinity Lutheran Church. His parents were Reading resident Catharina (Rush) Montgomery (1809–1865) and Johan Leonard Montgomery (1812–1880), a native of Northumberland County who became the proprietor of a hardware business after relocating to Reading in 1841.

His maternal grandfather, Phillip J. Rush (1784–1872), was a Reading native and weaver who had served in the Pennsylvania Militia as a Fife Major with Brigadier-General John Addams’ 1st Regiment, 2nd Brigade during the War of 1812. His maternal grandmother, Barbara (Spohn) Rush (1876–1853), was a daughter of American Revolutionary War Patriot Captain John Spohn, whose troops fought in the Battle of Long Island on August 27, 1776.

Montgomery grew up in Reading with five siblings: Jonas A. (1844–1903), who later served as a bugler for the 1st Pennsylvania Light Artillery during the American Civil War and wed Mary Renninger; Mary Elizabeth, Sarah, and John. He experienced tragedy early in life when his two youngest siblings died sometime before 1850. That year, a federal census taker noted that the family resided in Reading’s Northeast Ward, and included only Leonard and Catharine Montgomery and three children: Jonas, Morton, and Mary.

Montgomery was educated in his community's common elementary school from childhood through 1860, and then at a Reading high school until 1863, and showed an aptitude for drafting and mathematics.

== Career ==
=== Early career ===
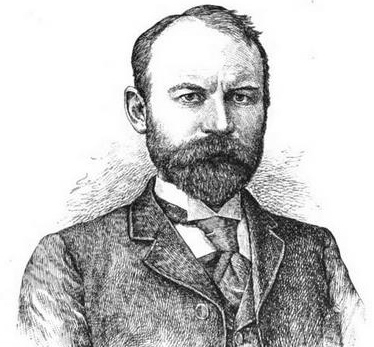
Montgomery as depicted in his 1896 book, Historical Sketch of Reading Artillerists

Following graduation, he apprenticed for eight months with Reading city engineer and Berks County surveyor Daniel S. Zacharias before accepting a position with Pottsville coal mining engineer Daniel Hoffman, a job he held for two years. Returning to Reading sometime around 1866, he took his first steps along the path toward becoming a practicing attorney, studying for three years under Jacob S. Livingood, Esq. According to Montgomery’s later recollections, in addition to his studies, he assisted “in the preparation of cases, arguments, proceedings in partition, conveyancing, etc.”

During the fall of 1869, he took a brief break from his studies to broaden his horizons, traveling throughout America’s eastern and middle states.

=== Attorney ===
By 1870, he was a 23-year-old law student at Harvard University in Cambridge, Massachusetts.” When not on the Harvard campus, according to the federal census that year, he resided at the home of his father, Leonard, in Reading’s 8th Ward. Also living there was his 21-year-old sister, Mary Montgomery. After completing two years of study at Harvard in 1871, he returned to Reading, where he finished his required third year of study in practicum with attorney Samuel L. Young, Esq. Admitted to the State Bar of Pennsylvania on August 28, 1871, Montgomery then practiced law professionally.

It was also during this decade that he wed and began a family. After marrying Florence Baugh in Chester County in 1875, he and his wife greeted the arrival of daughter Florence Baugh Montgomery (1878–1960) on November 22, 1878. She was christened on June 8, 1878 at the same church – Trinity Lutheran in Reading – where Morton Montgomery had been baptized thirty-two years earlier.

As he advanced professionally as an attorney, Montgomery quickly began to appreciate the historical importance of the data he was uncovering while conducting research for a wider and wider range of clients, particularly as it "relat[ed] to the early settlements and formation of the townships … and all the districts of [Berks] county." This realization inspired him to pen a series of articles about the county’s history for local newspapers and his Political Hand-Book of Berks County, Pennsylvania (1883), and also became the impetus for his landmark History of Berks County in Pennsylvania. A culmination of a decade’s worth of research and writing, the latter was published in 1886.

=== Author ===
In 1896, he researched and wrote a history of the Berks County Militia unit known as the Reading Artillerists, and then delivered a lecture based on that work for the Artillerists' 102nd anniversary celebration at Metropolitan Hall in Reading on May 25, 1896.

He followed with School History of Berks County in Pennsylvania in 1899, "the first book of the kind published in the United States," according to Montgomery. As his written works became more widely known, he was invited to speak to interested audiences at historical societies, libraries, teacher in-service days, and special civic events across the county and statewide. Early lecture titles included "Conrad Weiser, the First Representative Man of Berks County" and "Revolutionary Heroes of Berks County." The next year, during his city's Fourth of July celebrations in 1890, he delivered an oration "on the objects, influence and success of the "Patriotic Order Sons of America."

Still practicing law after the turn of the century while continuing to work on his historical research and writing, he and his wife and daughter, Florence, were documented by federal census takers as residents of a home at 1104 Perkiomen Avenue in Reading in 1900.

In April 1909, local newspapers announced that his daughter, Florence, "one of the most popular of Reading’s young society women," was engaged to Joshua Brooke Lessig, president of Lessig Iron Works and of Pottstown's Citizens National Bank. The same announcement described Morton Montgomery as a "leading lawyer and local historian...social favorite and accomplished musician.

He also released a revised version of his History of Berks County. Expanded with enough additional content to fill a two-volume set of books, the 1909 edition was published by Chicago's J.H. Beers & Co. as Historical and Biographical Annals of Berks County, Pennsylvania: Embracing a Concise History of the County and a Genealogical and Biographical Record of Representative Families.

In 1914, he was widowed suddenly when his wife collapsed and died on the evening of Friday, November 20. The Philadelphia Inquirer reported that she "was found dead on the floor of her home here [in Reading] today from heart failure, brought on by exhaustion following her return from a visit to her daughter, Mrs. Joseph Brooke Lessig, at Pottstown," and also described Morton Montgomery as "a prominent local lawyer and historian."

Sometime after his wife's death, Montgomery relocated to Allentown, Pennsylvania, and was documented as an Allentown resident in both the 1920 and 1930 U.S. federal census ledgers, the latter of which confirmed that he was a widower residing at the Sixth Street home of Martin and Mary Bontz in Allentown.

== Death and legacy ==
Montgomery died in Allentown in 1933.

=== Citation of Montgomery's work by other historians ===
Montgomery's published works continue to be cited by historians, journal article submissions, and other publications. An abridged list of 20th and 21st-century academic, military and public historians who have cited Montgomery's work includes:

- Sharon A. Brown, a historian who chose to cite Montgomery's Early Furnaces and Forges of Berks County, Pennsylvania in chapter two of Historic Resource Study: Slateford Farm: Delaware Water Gap National Recreation Area, which was prepared for the National Park Service and U.S. Department of the Interior in September 1985.
- Detre Library and Archives personnel at the Senator John Heinz History Center, who listed Montgomery's Lecture on the Life and Times of Conrad Weiser, the First Representative Man of Berks County as one of the resources in its "British, French, and Indian War Bibliography,"
- Richard Greenwood, a Washington, D.C.-based historian who chose to list Montgomery's 1886 History of Berks County, Pennsylvania as one of his three "Major Bibliographic References" when serving as the survey historian for the Landmark Review Task Force involved in nominating the Womelsdorf home and grounds of French and Indian War negotiator Conrad Weiser for placement on the National Register of Historic Places in 1975.
- John M. Lawlor, Jr., an American Civil War historian and professor emeritus at Reading Area Community College, who cited Montgomery's History of Berks County, Pennsylvania in his article, "Spinning Custer: A Pennsylvania Editor's Assessment of Little Bighorn", in Federal History Journal, Issue 10, 2018.
- U.S. National Archives and University of Virginia Press personnel, who cited Montgomery's Early Furnaces and Forges of Berks County, Pennsylvania in their joint distance learning initiative, Founders Online: Correspondence and Other Writings of Six Major Shapers of the United States: John Adams in the article, "The Board of War to the Officer in Charge of Hessian Prisoners, 16 September 1777."

== Publications ==
- Montgomery, Morton L. “Early Forges and Furnaces of Berks County, Pennsylvania," in The Pennsylvania Magazine of History and Biography, Vol. 8, No. 1 (Mar., 1884), pp. 56-81. Philadelphia, Pennsylvania: The Historical Society of Pennsylvania and University of Pennsylvania Press, 1884 (no ISBN/OCLC/ISSN found, but free access is available through JSTOR; registration required).
- Montgomery, Morton L. Historical and Biographical Annals of Berks County, Pennsylvania: Embracing a Concise History of the County and a Genealogical and Biographical Record of Representative Families, Vol. I, p. 402. Chicago, Illinois: J.H. Beers & Co., 1909. OCLC 16394867
- Montgomery, Morton L. Historical Sketch of Reading Artillerists: Read Upon the Occasion of Their 102d Anniversary in Metropolitan Hall, May 25, 1896. Chicago, Illinois: J.E. Norton & Company, 1897. OCLC 16413450
- Montgomery, Morton L. History of Berks County in Pennsylvania. Philadelphia, Pennsylvania: Everts, Peck & Richards, 1886. OCLC 11333191
- Montgomery, Morton L. History of Berks County, Pennsylvania, in the Revolution, from 1774 to 1783. Reading, Pennsylvania: Chas. F. Haage, Printer, 1894. OCLC 3109203
- Montgomery, Morton L. History of Lodge No. 62, F. and A.M. [Freemasons]: Working Under the Jurisdiction of the Grand Lodge of Pennsylvania, from 1794 to 1894, Including the Centennial Proceedings. Reading, Pennsylvania: Chas. F. Haage, 1894. OCLC 13798668
- Montgomery, Morton L. History of Reading, Pennsylvania, and the Anniversary Proceedings of the Sesqui-Centennial, June 5-12, 1898. Reading, Pennsylvania: Times Book Printers, 1898. OCLC 1744980
- Montgomery, Morton L. Lecture on the Life and Times of Conrad Weiser: The First Representative Man of Berks County. Reading, Pennsylvania: Board of Trade of Reading, 1893. OCLC 16413341
- Montgomery, Morton L. Political Hand-Book of Berks County, Pennsylvania, 1752–1883. Reading, Pennsylvania: Press of B.F. Owen, 1883 (database-searchable version available through Ancestry.com; registration required). OCLC 3545996
- Montgomery, Morton L. School History of Berks County in Pennsylvania. Philadelphia, Pennsylvania: J.B. Rodgers Printing Co., 1889. OCLC 3801020
