= 47th Pennsylvania Infantry Regiment =

Union Army infantry regiment

47th Regiment, Pennsylvania Volunteer Infantry
- Also known as 47th Pennsylvania Infantry or 47th Pennsylvania Volunteers (*not to be confused with the 47th Pennsylvania Militia, Emergency of 1863)
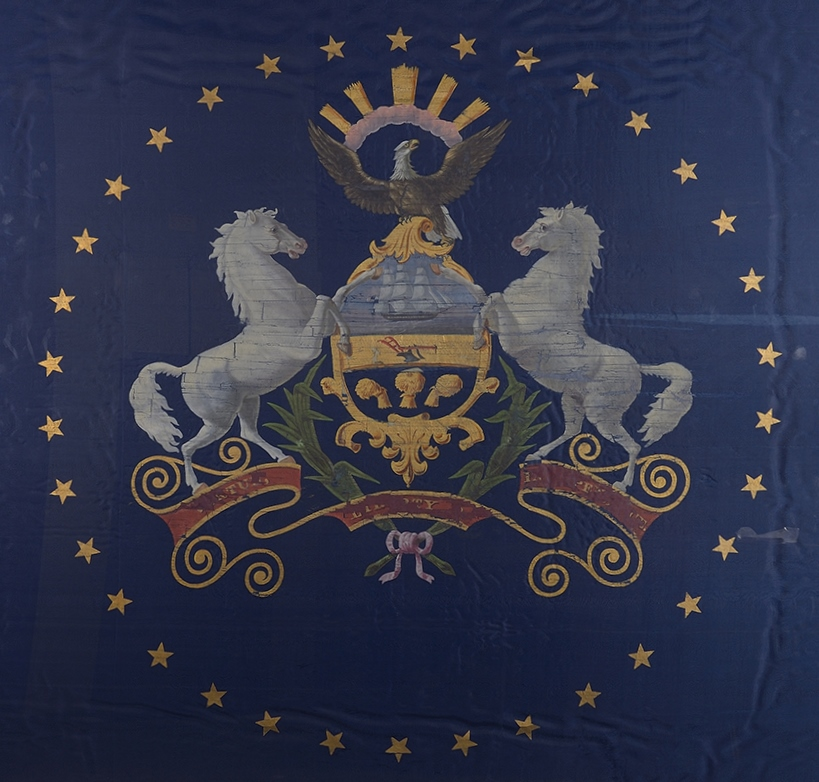
- The state flag of Pennsylvania, c. 1863
- Active: August 1861 – January 1866
- Country: United States
- Allegiance: Union
- Branch: Infantry
- Engagements: Battle of Pocotaligo, South Carolina (October 1862); Red River Campaign, Louisiana (March to early July 1864); Sheridan's 1864 Shenandoah Valley Campaign, Virginia (Fall 1864)

Commanders
- Founder: Colonel Tilghman H. Good (1861–1864)
- Second in Command: Lieutenant Colonel George Warren Alexander (1861–1864)
- Final Commander: Brevet Brigadier General John Peter Shindel Gobin (1864–1866)

The 47th Pennsylvania Infantry Regiment, officially known as the 47th Regiment, Pennsylvania Volunteer Infantry and frequently referred to as the 47th Pennsylvania Volunteers, was an infantry regiment that served in the Union Army during the American Civil War and the early months of the Reconstruction era. It was formed by adults and teenagers from small towns and larger metropolitan areas in central, northeastern, and southeastern regions of Pennsylvania.

With respect to demographics, a large percentage of 47th Pennsylvania Volunteers were men who had emigrated from Germany during the early to mid-1800s or were Pennsylvania-born men of German heritage whose family and friends still spoke German or its Pennsylvania Dutch variant more than a century after their ancestors emigrated from Germany in search of religious or political freedom.

In addition, a significant number of its members were immigrants from Ireland and two were natives of Cuba. Nine or more were formerly enslaved Black men who had escaped or been liberated from plantations in South Carolina and Louisiana.

Roughly seventy percent of those who served with the 47th Pennsylvania Infantry were residents of the cities of Allentown, Bethlehem, Catasauqua, Easton, and surrounding communities in Lehigh and Northampton counties in the present-day Lehigh Valley region of eastern Pennsylvania. Company C, also known as the Sunbury Guards, was formed primarily with men from Northumberland County. Companies D and H were staffed by men from Perry County. The non-Lehigh Valley membership remains significant, historically, in the present day because a lieutenant governor of the state, the creator of a prosperous hat factory, inventors, and others who lived in areas other than the Lehigh Valley before and after the war became prominent civic and business leaders, post-war.

Recruited at community gathering places in their respective hometowns, most of the men who served with the 47th Pennsylvania Volunteer Infantry enrolled for military service at county seats or other large population centers. The oldest member of the regiment, sixty-five-year-old Benjamin Walls, was an affluent farmer who would attempt to reenlist three years later at the age of sixty-eight after being seriously wounded while preventing his regiment's American flag from falling into enemy hands during the Battle of Pleasant Hill. The youngest was John Boulton Young, a thirteen-year-old drummer boy from Sunbury. Dubbed "Boltie" (or "Boulty") and described in letters home by regimental officers as the regiment's "pet," he became the 47th Pennsylvania's first casualty, succumbing to smallpox at the Kalorama eruptive fever hospital in Georgetown on October 17, 1861. According to The Daily Item in Sunbury, the uniform that Young had worn during his brief service was a dark blue wool Zouave-style jacket with red trim and red wool pants [with] leather gaiters to protect his legs while marching," a style dramatically different from the more traditional Union blues worn by other members of the regiment. Due to his small stature, Young was also given "an undersized, nonregulation drum complete with small drumsticks," which measured just "13 1/2 inches across and...13 inches deep."

Many of the men who initially served with the 47th Pennsylvania Volunteers did so after first completing their three months' service with other regiments from Pennsylvania in response to President Abraham Lincoln's April 15, 1861, call for volunteers to defend the nation's capital following Fort Sumter's fall to Confederate forces in mid-April 1861. Reenlisting in hometowns following their respective honorable discharges from that service, they mustered in as part of the newly formed 47th Regiment, Pennsylvania Volunteer Infantry in at Camp Curtin in Harrisburg during August and September 1861.

Ultimately, this regiment also came to be known as the 47th Pennsylvania Veteran Volunteers due to the number of its members who chose to re-enlist for second terms of service between 1863 and 1864.

== History ==
=== Founding and first months of operation (1861) ===
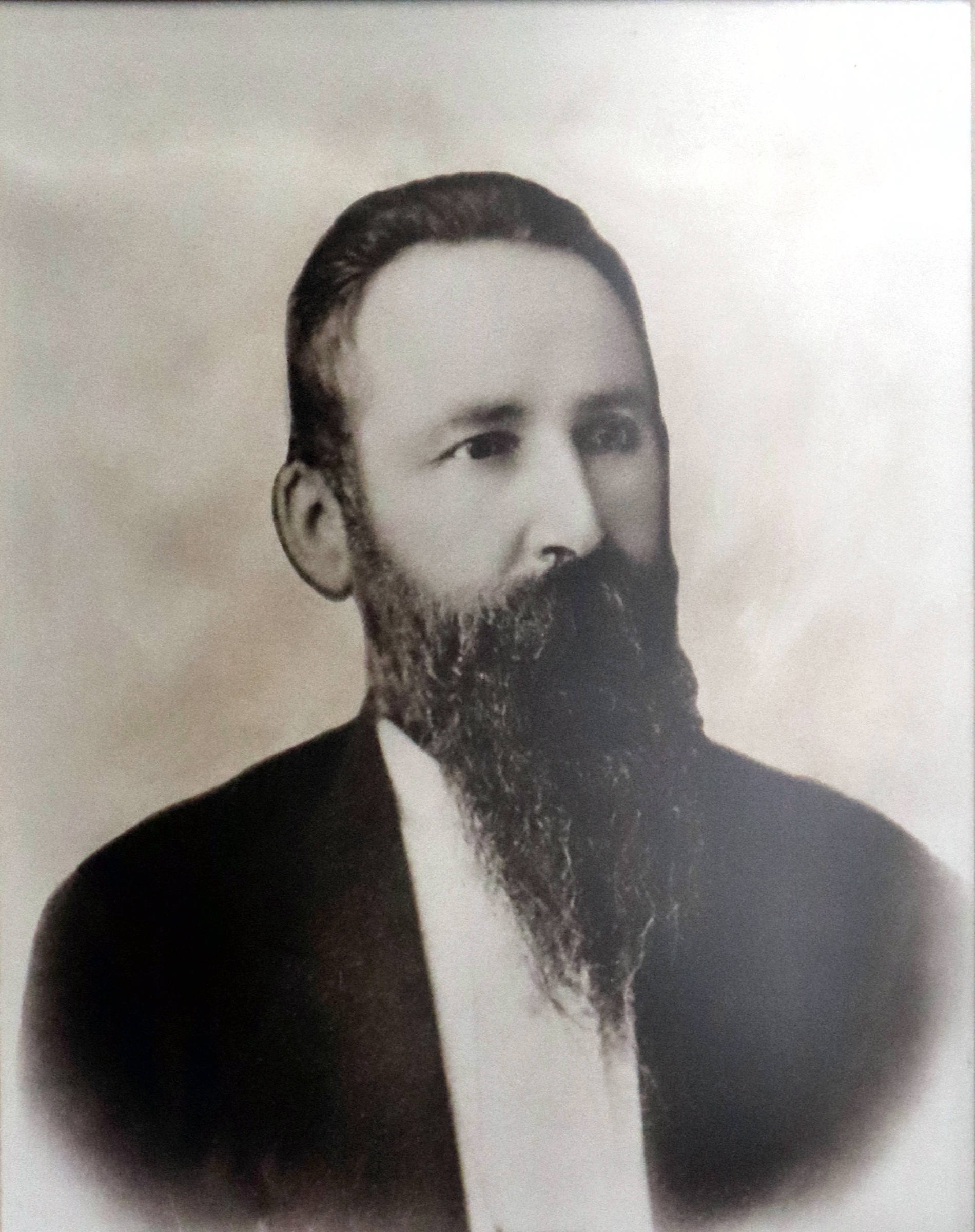
Colonel Tilghman H. Good, shown circa 1870, founded the 47th Pennsylvania Volunteers in August 1861 and was its first commanding officer

John P. S. Gobin, the 47th regiment's final commanding officer

The 47th Pennsylvania Infantry was founded by Colonel Tilghman H. Good, who previously served as captain, from 1850 to 1857, of the Allentown-based local militia unit known as the Allen Rifles, leader of the 4th Pennsylvania Infantry Regiment and commanding officer of the 1st Pennsylvania Infantry Regiment's Company I. Following his honorable discharge on July 23, 1861, Pennsylvania Governor Andrew Curtin authorized Good to form a new regiment on August 5, 1861. Good immediately began recruiting men, including William H. Gausler, who had served with him in the 1st Pennsylvania Infantry Regiment and was the former captain of a local militia unit, the Jordan Artillerists.

Following a brief training period in light infantry tactics at Camp Curtin in Harrisburg, the 47th Pennsylvania Volunteers were deployed south by rail to Washington, D.C. on September 20, 1861. Marched to a soldiers' rest station upon arrival, they were fed and rested before being marched to Camp Kalorama, which was located in Kalorama Heights near Georgetown, roughly two miles from the White House. On September 24, 1861, the 47th Pennsylvania Regiment assimilated into the U.S. Army when its men were officially mustered into federal service.

Three days later, on September 27, 1861, the 47th Pennsylvania was assigned to Brigadier General Isaac Stevens' 3rd Brigade, which also included the 33rd, 49th and 79th New York regiments. By that afternoon, the Mississippi rifle-armed infantrymen were on the march to Camp Lyon, Maryland on the Potomac River's eastern shore. At 5 p.m., they moved double-quick (one hundred and sixty-five steps per minute using thirty-three-inch steps) with the 46th Pennsylvania across the Chain Bridge marked on federal maps and then on toward Falls Church, Virginia. Arriving at Camp Advance around dusk, after completing an eight-mile trek, they made camp in a deep ravine near Fort Ethan Allen and General William Farrar Smith's headquarters and about two miles from the Chain Bridge. Under Smith's leadership, their regiment and brigade were now part of the larger Army of the Potomac, and would help to defend the nation's capital through late January when the men of the 47th Pennsylvania would be shipped south.

During this time, the weather was reported in letters home from the men to be cold and damp; as a result, several men from the regiment fell ill. Eleven days after the smallpox death of drummer boy John Boulton Young in October 1861, Sergeant Frank M. Holt also died at the Kalorama eruptive fever hospital. Sometime that same month, according to Schmidt, Private Reuben Wetzel from G Company, was seriously injured when the wagon he was on overturned while the regiment was relocating to Camp Griffin in Virginia. Suffering from a fractured tibia, he succumbed to complications at the Union Hotel General Hospital on November 17, 1861, and was interred at the Military Asylum Cemetery, now known as the U.S. Soldiers' and Airmen's Home National Cemetery.

On October 11, 1861, the 47th Pennsylvania Volunteers marched in the Grand Review at Bailey's Cross Roads at Camp Griffin. In a letter written around this time, Captain John Peter Shindel Gobin, the commanding officer of C Company, reported that companies D, A, C, F and I (the 47th Pennsylvania's right wing) were ordered to picket duty after the regiment's left wing (companies B, G, K, E, and H) had been forced to return to camp by Confederate troops. Eleven days later, the 47th engaged in a Divisional Review, described by historian Lewis Schmidt as massing "about 10,000 infantry, 1000 cavalry, and twenty pieces of artillery all in one big open field." During mid-November, the 47th Pennsylvanians were issued new Springfield rifles as reward for the regiment's successful performance.

=== 1862 ===
Ordered to leave their Virginia encampment in early 1862, the 47th Pennsylvania Volunteers moved by march, rail and steamer to Maryland, where they briefly quartered at the U.S. Naval Academy before boarding the steamship Oriental on January 27, 1862. Following Brigadier-General Brannan's directive, they sailed for Florida, a state which, despite its secession, remained important to the Union Army due to the presence of Forts Taylor and Jefferson.

Steaming south from January 27 to early February 1862, the men of the 47th traveled from Annapolis to Key West, Florida, where they were assigned to garrison duty at Fort Taylor. In addition to strengthening the fortifications of the federal installation, they felled trees, built new roads and drilled daily in heavy artillery or other military tactics. On February 14, they marched in a parade through the streets of Key West.

From mid-June through July, the 47th Pennsylvania Volunteers were sent to Hilton Head, South Carolina, where they were attached to the Beaufort District, Department of the South. Letters written by officers and enlisted men during this time describe frequent picket duty assignments which placed them at increased risk for sniper fire. Illness continued to be a constant problem during this phase of duty as evidenced by Army hospital and death ledger notations of men suffering from sunstroke, typhoid fever or other tropical diseases, and dysentery and similar ailments attributable to the poor water quality and unsanitary conditions of soldiers' quarters.

==== Capture of Saint John's Bluff, Florida (Early October 1862) ====
During a return expedition to Florida, which began September 30, 1862, the 47th joined with the 1st Connecticut Battery, 7th Connecticut Infantry, and part of the 1st Massachusetts Cavalry in assaulting the heavily protected Confederate encampment during the Battle of St. Johns Bluff. Trekking through roughly twenty-five miles of dense swampland and forests along the St. John's River after disembarking from ships at Mayport Mills on October 1, the 47th captured artillery and ammunition stores (on October 3), which had been abandoned by Confederate forces due to the bluff's bombardment by Union gunboats. Companies E and K were then subsequently sent on detached duty, and participated with other Union troops in the October 7 capture of the Governor Milton, a Confederate steamship which had been ferrying troops and supplies along the St. John's River.

==== Battle of Pocotaligo, South Carolina (October 21–23, 1862) ====
From October 21–23, 1862, under the brigade and regimental commands of Colonel Tilghman H. Good and Lieutenant Colonel George Warren Alexander, the 47th Pennsylvania Volunteers joined with other Union Army regiments in an attempt to destroy the railroad system in and around Pocotaligo, South Carolina. Landing at Mackay's Point, the men of the 47th Pennsylvania were placed on point for the 3rd Brigade, but the brigade faced stiff Confederate Army resistance. Peppered by snipers en route to the Pocotaligo Bridge, the Union troops also encountered an entrenched Confederate battery which began firing on the Union soldiers as they entered an open cotton field. Those from the Union side who headed toward higher ground at the Frampton Plantation fared no better as they were subjected to rifle and artillery fire from the surrounding forests.

As the fighting continued, Union troops pursued the Confederate forces for four miles as they retreated to the bridge. There, the 47th relieved the 7th Connecticut. But after two more hours of intense fighting, depleted ammunition forced the 47th Pennsylvanians to abandon their efforts to take the ravine and bridge; they withdrew to Mackay's Point.

Two officers and eighteen enlisted men from the 47th Pennsylvania were killed with an additional two officers and one hundred and fourteen enlisted men wounded in action. Captain Charles Mickley sustained a fatal head wound in the fighting at Frampton Plantation. Captain George Junker of K Company died from his wounds three days later at the Union Army's post hospital at Hilton Head. The graves of several men lost in this engagement remain unidentified.

=== 1863 ===
Having been ordered back to Fort Taylor in Key West on November 15, 1862, the 47th Pennsylvania Volunteers spent the whole of 1863 in Florida as part of the Union Army's 10th Corps, Department of the South. In order to maximize the regiment's resources, Companies A, B, C, E, G, and I of the 47th Pennsylvania garrisoned Fort Taylor in Key West while Companies D, F, H, and K garrisoned Fort Jefferson, the Union's remote installation in Florida's Dry Tortugas.

As before, disease and the harsh climate were constant adversaries. But despite this, more than half of the soldiers from the 47th Pennsylvania Volunteers opted to re-enlist for additional three-year tours of duty when their initial terms of service expired, as evidenced by muster rolls of the period.

It was also during this phase of service that Rafael Perez enrolled for military duty with Company C of the 47th Pennsylvania Volunteers. A native of Cuba, Perez had emigrated with his father to Key West sometime before 1860. The 1860 U.S. Census documented the Perez residency in Key West, as well as the father's employment as a cigar maker. Although military records stated that Rafael Perez was eighteen at the time of his enlistment (spelling his given name as "Raphael"), the 1860 census and other records indicate that he may have been just sixteen, or possibly even younger. He officially mustered in for duty on May 20, 1863.

=== 1864 ===
During the opening days and weeks of 1864, men from the 47th's A Company were detached on special duty to rehabilitate Fort Myers, which had been abandoned in 1858 after the third U.S. war with the Seminole Indians. This detachment was also ordered to raid cattle herds owned by Confederate sympathizers in order to provide much-needed meat for the growing Union troop presence in the region.

The entire regiment then made history a few short months later when the 47th Pennsylvania Volunteers became the only regiment from the Keystone State to fight in Union General Nathaniel Banks' Red River campaign across Louisiana from March to June 1864. Steaming for New Orleans aboard the Charles Thomas, the 47th Pennsylvanians arrived at Algiers, Louisiana on February 28, 1864, and were then transported by rail to Brashear City before hopping another steamer to Franklin via the Bayou Teche. There, the 47th joined the 2nd Brigade, 1st Division of the Department of the Gulf's 19th Army Corps.

From March 14 to 26, 1864, the 47th passed through New Iberia, Vermilionville (now Lafayette), Opelousas, and Washington while en route to Alexandria and Natchitoches. On April 5, the 47th Pennsylvania Volunteers liberated five enslaved Black men from area plantations and enrolled them as undercooks and cooks.

Often short on food and water, the regiment encamped briefly at Pleasant Hill the night of April 7 before continuing on the next day. Marching until mid-afternoon, they were rushed into battle ahead of other regiments in the 2nd Division during the Battle of Sabine Cross Roads (also known as the Battle of Mansfield) on April 8, 1864. The fighting was so intense, according to multiple historical accounts, that exhausted men fell between the dead and dying as the battle wore on, finally subsiding when darkness fell. The surviving Union troops finally withdrew to Pleasant Hill after midnight. Afterward, regimental leaders determined that the 47th Pennsylvania had sustained sixty casualties in dead, wounded or missing.

The next day, April 9, 1864, the 47th Pennsylvania Volunteers were ordered to form a defensive position on the Union's far right. As they did so, the regiment's right flank spread out and up onto a bluff. Once again, the fighting was brutal and protracted. Known as the Battle of Pleasant Hill, the engagement included a mid-day charge by Confederate troops commanded by General Richard Taylor, son of Zachary Taylor, a former President of the United States. At one point, the 47th Pennsylvania blocked another Confederate assault by bolstering the 165th New York's buckling lines.

Once again, the 47th Pennsylvania sustained heavy casualties. The regiment's second in command, Lieutenant Colonel George Warren Alexander was nearly killed, and the regiment's two color-bearers, both from Company C, were also wounded while preventing the American flag from falling into enemy hands. A number of other men were killed or severely wounded in action.

As a direct result of the Battle of Pleasant Hill, the 47th Pennsylvania Volunteers also earned another distinction, becoming the only Pennsylvania regiment to have members held as prisoners of war at Camp Ford, a Confederate prison camp near Tyler, Texas. At least sixteen soldiers from the 47th, several of whom were wounded, were marched roughly one hundred and twenty-five miles to Camp Ford. Held there or at Camp Groce as POWs, most were released during prisoner exchanges beginning in July 1864, but at least two men from the 47th Pennsylvania died in captivity, and another died months later while being treated at a Confederate prison hospital in Shreveport.

After this battle, the 47th Pennsylvanians fell back to Grand Ecore, where the men resupplied and regrouped until April 22. Retreating further to Alexandria, they and their fellow Union soldiers scored a victory against Confederate troops in the Battle of Monett's Ferry, which was also known as the Battle of Cane River. Placed under the command of Lieutenant Colonel Joseph Bailey, they subsequently helped to build a timber dam from April 30 through May 10 to enable federal gunboats to negotiate the Red River's fluctuating water levels.

Beginning May 16, most of the 47th Pennsylvania moved from Simmesport across the Atchafalaya River to Morganza and then on to New Orleans on June 20. On July 4, the regiment received orders to return to Washington, D.C., and left Louisiana in two stages. Companies A, C, D, E, F, H, and I headed for the Washington, D.C. area aboard the McClellan beginning 7 July while the men from Companies B, G and K remained behind awaiting transportation. Led by F Company Captain Henry S. Harte, the latter group departed at the end of the month aboard the Blackstone, arrived in Virginia on 28 July, and reconnected with the larger part of the regiment at Monocacy, Virginia on 2 August.

According to U.S. Army hospital and burial ledgers, several members of the regiment were left behind in New Orleans to convalesce from disease or battle wounds; others were discharged on Surgeons' Certificates of Disability and permitted to return home. Many of the Pennsylvanians who died during or after the Red River Campaign were interred at the national cemeteries at Chalmette or Baton Rouge but, as with South Carolina, a number of resting places for soldiers from the 47th Pennsylvania still remain unidentified.

==== Snicker's Gap and Berryville, Virginia (Summer 1864) ====
Following their return to the Washington, D.C. area, the 47th Pennsylvania Volunteers joined General David Hunter's forces in fighting Confederate troops at Snicker's Gap, Virginia in mid-July 1864. Also known as the Battle of Cool Spring, this engagement drove Confederates away from the area around Berryville and, according to multiple historians, helped pave the way for General Philip Sheridan's 1864 successes in the Shenandoah Valley.

==== Sheridan's 1864 Shenandoah Valley Campaign ====
Attached in August 1864 to the Middle Military Division, Army of the Shenandoah, the 47th Pennsylvanians saw their next major action during the Battle of Berryville from September 3 to 4. The following day, Captain Daniel Oyster of C Company sustained the first of two shoulder wounds he would suffer in less than two months. August and September also saw the departure of officers and enlisted men as terms of service expired and were not renewed. A large contingent mustered out at Berryville, Virginia on September 18, 1864.

==== Battles of Opequan and Fisher's Hill (September 1864) ====
Now under the command of Union General Philip H. Sheridan and Brigadier-General William H. Emory, commander of the 19th Corps, the 47th Pennsylvania Volunteers helped to inflict heavy casualties on Lieutenant General Jubal Early's Confederate forces in the Battle of Opequan (also known as the Third Battle of Winchester). According to Samuel P. Bates, the 47th Pennsylvania's involvement began at 2 a.m. on September 19, 1864. Advancing slowly with other regiments in the Union's 19th Corps from Berryville toward Winchester, the advance faltered as the massive Union troop movement clogged march routes, enabling Early's forces to dig in. When Union troops finally reached the Opequan Creek, they were hit hard by enemy fire, particularly from Confederate artillery which had been able to position itself on high ground.

Ultimately the Union Army was able to force Early's men into retreat, first to Fisher's Hill (September 21 to 22) and then to Waynesboro following a successful early morning flanking attack.

In addition to the dead and wounded, the 47th Pennsylvania lost two of its key commanding officers in the aftermath as Colonel Tilghman H. Good and Lieutenant Colonel George W. Alexander honorably mustered out on September 23 to 24 upon expiration of their respective terms of service.

==== The Battle of Cedar Creek (October 19, 1864) ====
The bloodiest day of the entire war for the 47th Pennsylvania Volunteers was October 19, 1864. Before the day was over, the regiment would lose the equivalent of nearly two full companies of men.

The day began when Lieutenant General Jubal Early's Confederate Army launched a surprise, early morning attack on Union General Philip Sheridan's Union troops encamped near Cedar Creek. According to Samuel Bates in his History of Pennsylvania Volunteers, as the day wore on:

The brigade occupied a position in the center of a semi-circle, formed by a channel in the curve of the creek, and in the rear of the line of the works. When the Army of West Virginia, under Crook, was surprised and driven from its works, the Second Brigade, with the Forty-seventh on the right, was thrown into the breach to arrest the retreat.... A heavy fog prevented objects from being visible at a distance of fifty yards. Scarcely was it in position before the enemy came suddenly upon it.... The right of the regiment was thrown back until it was almost a semi-circle. The brigade, only fifteen hundred strong, was contending against Gordon's entire division, and was forced to retire.... Repeatedly forming as it was pushed back, and making a stand at every available point, it finally succeeded in checking the enemy's onset, when General Sheridan suddenly appeared upon the field, who 'met his crest-fallen, shattered battalions, without a word of reproach, but joyously swinging his cap, shouted to the stragglers, as he rode rapidly past them – "Face the other way boys! We are going back to our camp! We are going to lick them out of their boots!"

By 1 p.m., wrote Bates, the 19th Corps had pushed the enemy back:

The force of the blow fell heavily upon the Forty-seventh, but it stood firm, and was complimented on the field by General Thomas...When the final grand charge was made, the regiment moved at nearly right angles with the rebel front. The brigade charged gallantly, and the entire line, making a left wheel, came down on his flank while engaging the Sixth Corps, when 'he went whirling up the valley' in confusion. In pursuit to Fisher's Hill the regiment led, and upon its arrival was placed upon the skirmish line, where it remained until twelve o'clock M. of the following day.

When it was all over, Captain John Goebel of G Company was mortally wounded and Captain Daniel Oyster (C Company) was severely wounded. Captain Edwin Minnich of B Company and C Company's Sergeant William Pyers, the man who had kept the American flag from falling into enemy hands during the Battle of Pleasant Hill six months earlier, were among the dead. Pyers' son Samuel, a musician who was also serving with the 47th Pennsylvania's C Company and had witnessed his father's death that day, was still too traumatized to talk about the experience when interviewed by a Lebanon, Pennsylvania newspaper reporter decades later.

A number of men were also captured during the Battle of Cedar Creek, and held as POWs at the Confederate prison camp at Salisbury, North Carolina. Sergeant William Fry of C Company survived his ordeal at Andersonville only to die from the disease he had contracted there while at home in Sunbury, Pennsylvania a few short months after being released.

Afterward, as part of the 19th Corps, the 47th Pennsylvania was ordered to winter quarters at Camp Russell near Winchester, Virginia. Five days before Christmas, the 47th Pennsylvanians were ordered to move to Camp Fairview near Charlestown, West Virginia, where they were responsible for preserving the Union Army's control of the railroad system while minimizing the impact of enemy guerrilla forces in the region.

=== 1865–1866 ===
Assigned first to the Provisional Division of the 2nd Brigade of the Army of the Shenandoah in February, the 47th Pennsylvania Volunteers were ordered to relocate again in early April 1865. Moved by foot and rail via Kernstown and Winchester, they next settled at Fort Stevens near Washington, D.C. From there, they helped to defend the nation's capital once again, this time following the assassination of President Abraham Lincoln. During this time, at least one member of the regiment, Samuel Hunter Pyers, was assigned to guard the late President's funeral train.

In addition, other members of the 47th Pennsylvania Volunteers performed guard duties related to the imprisonment of the major conspirators in Abraham Lincoln's assassination.

While serving in Dwight's Division of the 2nd Brigade of the Department of Washington's 22nd Corps, the 47th Pennsylvania Volunteers also participated in the Union's Grand Review of the Armies on May 23–24, 1865. Serving with the U.S. Army's XIX (19th Corps), at this time, the 47th Pennsylvania marched in the massive military spectacle with their fellow Second Brigade units, 12th Connecticut, 26th Massachusetts, 153rd New York, and 8th Vermont, under the command of Brigadier-General E.P. Davis.

On their last swing through the South, the 47th Pennsylvania served in Savannah, Georgia from May 31 to June 4, 1865 as part of the 3rd Brigade, Dwight's Division, Department of the South, and at Charleston and other parts of South Carolina beginning in June.

The August 9, 1865 edition of The New York Times provided an update regarding the Union Army's occupation of Charleston, South Carolina, and described Major Levi Stuber of the 47th Pennsylvania as "Assistant Provost-Marshal Maj. LEVI STUBER, 47th Pennsylvania Volunteers," confirming other sources which indicate that the regiment was engaged in Provost (military police and other civil governance functions) during this time.

Garrisoning the city of Charleston with the 47th Pennsylvania were the members of the 165th New York Volunteers, companies of the 3rd Rhode Island Artillery, and the members of the 54th Massachusetts Volunteers. Portrayed in the 1989 Academy Award-winning movie, Glory, the 54th Massachusetts was the first military unit assembled in the North composed of African American soldiers. "Quiet and order continue[d] to prevail in Charleston" on July 29 with the help of the 47th Pennsylvania, according to the August 7, 1865 edition of The Commercial Bulletin, a Richmond, Virginia newspaper.

Several men from the 47th Pennsylvania also helped to restore a free and functioning press. The October 7, 1865 edition of Charleston's newspaper, The Leader, reported that:

The prospect of an early issue looked dubious...It was a streak of good fortune that made known our wants to the printers of the 47th Pennsylvania Veteran Volunteers, doing duty in this city; and with characteristic devotion to the cause of freedom, John G. Snyder, and Luther Horn, of Easton Pa., and Joseph Hartnagel of New York city came forward and volunteered their services. Edwin Coombs, Esq., formerly editor of the Mass. Atlantic Messenger, also gave us valuable aid. But for the assistance of the "boys in blue" our issue must have been delayed much longer. We shall ever cherish their friendship, and trust when their term of enlistment shall expire they will receive a hearty welcome to the old Keystone State.

==== Close of the war and final muster out ====
Finally, on Christmas Day, 1865, the men of the 47th Regiment, Pennsylvania Volunteer Infantry began to honorably muster out at Charleston, South Carolina. The process continued through early January 1866, and then the men were shipped home by sea to New York City and via rail to Camp Cadwalader in Philadelphia, where most received their final discharge papers on January 9, 1866.

Their regimental commanding officers at the time were Brevet Brigadier-General John Peter Shindel Gobin, Lieutenant Colonel Charles W. Abbott, and Major Levi Stuber.

Of those who had commanded the regiment in battle, several went on to become statewide or community leaders, including Gobin, who was elected to the Pennsylvania Senate and then later elected as lieutenant governor, and Tilghman H. Good, who was elected three times as mayor of Allentown. Others moved west in search of greater freedom and fortune, settling in Kansas, Ohio, Iowa and even California; a significant number struggled with lifelong physical disabilities or "Soldiers' Heart" (post-traumatic stress disorder, or PTSD), living out their final years in boarding houses or within the network of U.S. National Homes for Disabled Volunteer Soldiers.

== Regimental reunions ==
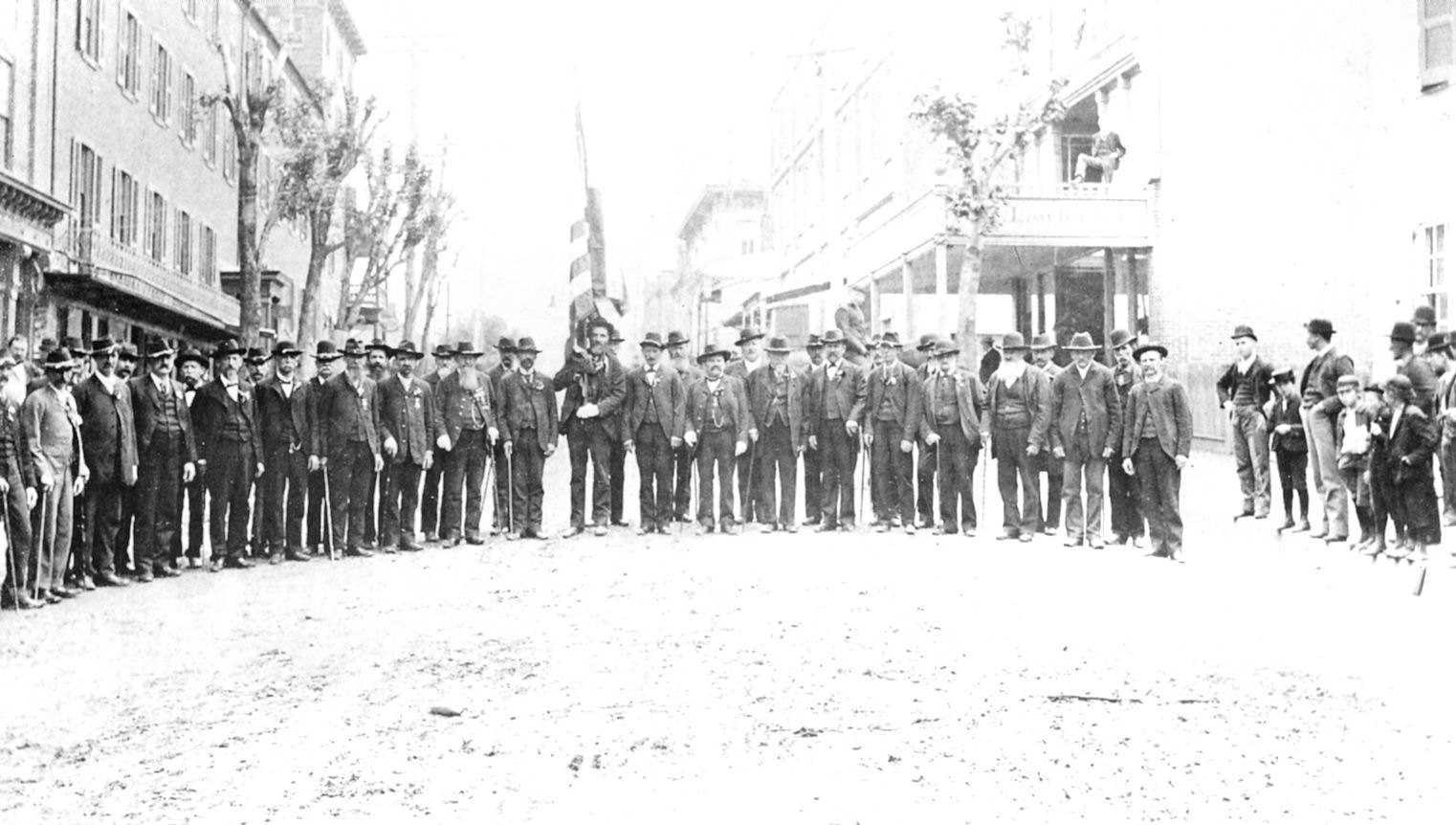
Surviving members of the 47th Pennsylvania Infantry Regiment at their annual reunion in Allentown, Pennsylvania in 1887

Following the muster out at Charleston, South Carolina of the 47th Pennsylvania, many members of the regiment maintained close ties with comrades through participation at local, regional and national Grand Army of the Republic (G.A.R.) meetings and via annual regimental reunions, which were well documented by newspapers statewide. On September 20, 1882, The Allentown Democrat announced that the "tenth [sic] annual reunion of the 47th regiment Pennsylvania Veteran Volunteers [would] be held in Catasauqua on Saturday, October 21st," and explained that the date had been chosen by event planners because October 22 was "the anniversary of the bloody battle of Pocotaligo, South Carolina, the first real engagement in which the regiment participated, and in which two of its company commandants fell, Capts. Mickley and Junker."

"A meeting of members residing in Allentown of the Forty-seventh Regiment Association was held" on October 12, 1899 "at Daeufer's saloon, to arrange for the annual reunion of the regiment to be held in this city on Monument Day" according to the next day's edition of The Allentown Leader, which also reported that, although South Bethlehem had originally been chosen as the location for that year's reunion, it would instead be held in Allentown due to the upcoming unveiling of that city's Soldiers' and Sailors' Monument. The newspaper added: "The regiment will participate in the parade [on Monument Day, October 19, 1899] and will carry their old tattered flag that was used in the war."

With its October 23, 1906 headline, "47th Holds Its 34th Reunion: Veterans Handsomely Entertained in Philadelphia," The Allentown Leader noted that, of the two hundred and twenty-five members of the regiment who were still alive in 1906, roughly one hundred attended that year's gathering, including Israel H. Troxell, who "came from the National Soldiers' Home in Virginia" and a "Captain Griffin" who "came especially from Detroit, Michigan, to grasp once more the hands of his comrades."

A decade later, that same newspaper presented a lengthy history of the regiment's Civil War activities in its article, "Glorious Reunion of 47th Regiment: 60 Survivors Meet in Allentown and Dine at Lafayette," and confirmed that one if its members, Benjamin Zellner, had been captured by enemy troops during the war and confined as a prisoner of war at Camp Sumter, the Confederate prison camp more commonly known as Andersonville.

== Memorials and other monuments ==
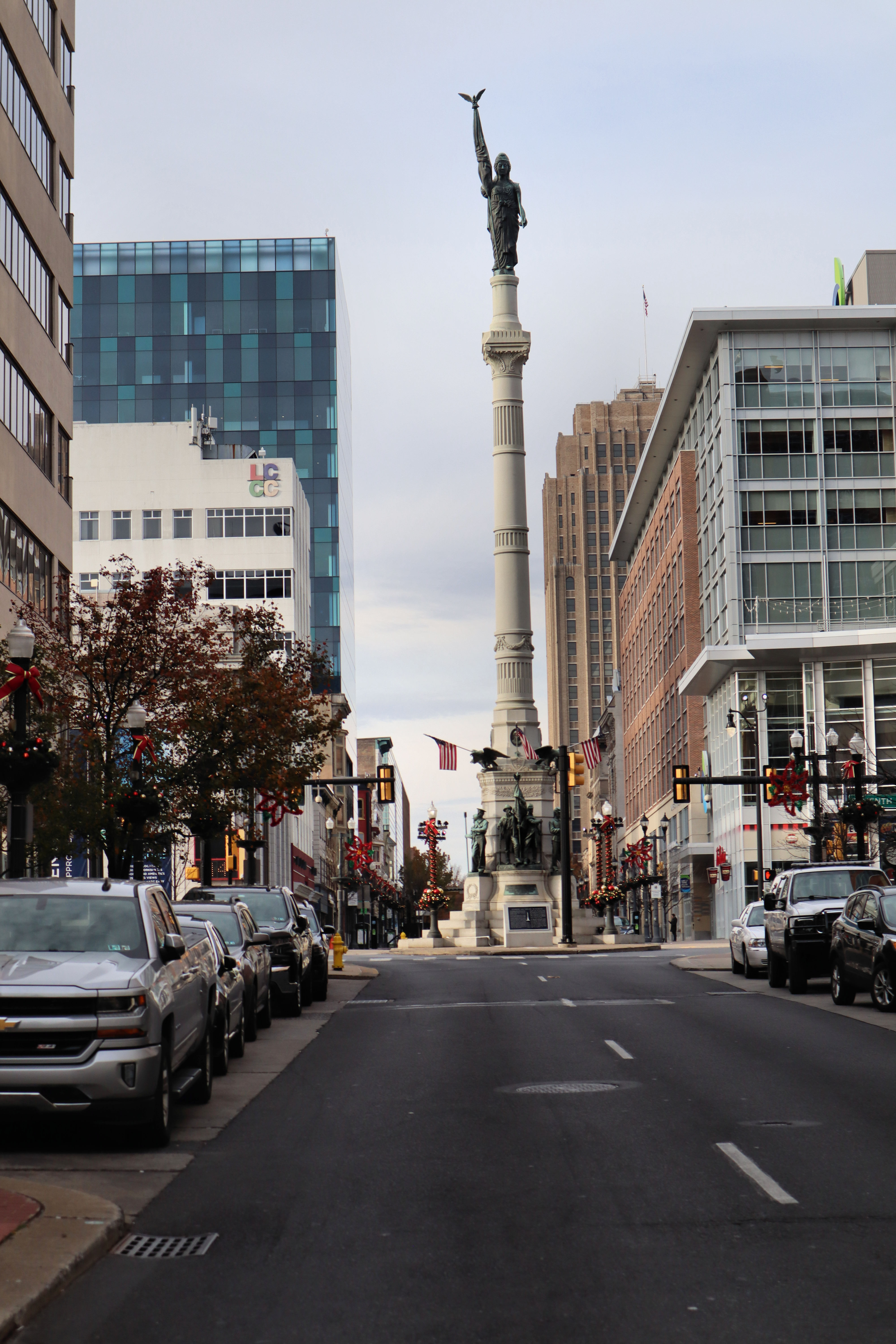
The Soldiers and Sailors Monument, erected in 1899 at Seventh and Hamilton streets in Center City Allentown, where it still stands, honors men from Allentown and its suburbs killed in their volunteer service in the 47th Pennsylvania Infantry Regiment and other Union Army units during the American Civil War.

From the late 19th century on and well into nearly the middle of the 20th century, small towns and large cities across Pennsylvania erected monuments to honor their respective residents who fought in the American Civil War. Some of these memorials were designed to pay homage only to the contributions of the 47th Pennsylvania Volunteers or one of its individual companies, such as the monument erected at the Sunbury Cemetery in Sunbury in Northumberland County, which honors the men who served with the 47th's C Company.

Others include the Emaus Honor Roll, which uses the town's original spelling, and was unveiled on June 7, 1930, in Emmaus, Pennsylvania. Located in a mini-park between 3rd and 4th Streets in Emmaus, this memorial honors soldiers who served during the American Civil War, Spanish–American War, and World War I.

The Lehigh County Soldiers and Sailors Monument, the soldiers' monuments at the Fairview and Heidelberg Union cemeteries in West Catasauqua and Heidelberg Township, respectively, honor men from multiple different military units.

On July 21, 1866, the Evening Telegraph, a Philadelphia newspaper, reported on the completion of Catasauqua's marble monument, noting that the "exceedingly chaste and appropriate" work of art was 26 feet tall, inscribed with verses from the Bible and venerated the contributions of soldiers from both the 46th and 47th Pennsylvania Volunteers.

On October 19, 1899, Allentown, Pennsylvania dedicated the Lehigh County Soldiers and Sailors Monument. Erected at 7th and Hamilton streets in Center City Allentown and topped by the Goddess of Liberty, the granite monument is 99 feet tall. One of its columns celebrates the theme of unity, and depicts two soldiers, one Union, one Confederate, linking arms in the spirit of "One Flag, One Country." Over 100 years after the dedication ceremony's conclusion, one Lehigh Valley media outlet celebrated the monument's centennial anniversary, and described the 47th Pennsylvania Infantry as the largest regiment in the Union Army.

As of 2017, all of these monuments are still standing.

== Company enrollment and muster order ==
According to Lewis Schmidt, author of A Civil War History of the 47th Regiment of Pennsylvania Veteran Volunteers, the ten companies of the 47th Pennsylvania Volunteers were mustered in at Camp Curtin in Harrisburg, Pennsylvania with nine hundred and eleven men (roughly ninety percent of the total number typically required to form a regiment) by Captain Jonathan R. Snead of the 5th U.S. Artillery. The companies were processed as follows:

- Company F: Recruited at Catasauqua, Lehigh County, Pennsylvania; mustered in at Camp Curtin from August 13 to 30, 1861; led by Captain Henry S. Harte from its inception until September 18, 1864, and then by Captain Edwin Gilbert until the close of the war.
- Regimental Band No. 1 (Pomp's Cornet Band): Enrolled at Easton, Northampton County; mustered in on August 14, 1861; led by Thomas Coates from its inception until the band's muster out in September 1862. Regimental Band No. 2 (brass section of the Allentown Band plus members of the Easton and Siegersville Bands), was recruited from across the Lehigh Valley, and led by Anton Benjamin Bush until September 18, 1864. Mustering in at Harrisburg or Fort Taylor in Key West, Florida from November 5, 1862 through June 1863, this second band served with the 47th Pennsylvania Volunteers until the end of the war.
- Company C ("Sunbury Guards"): Recruited at Sunbury, Northumberland County, Pennsylvania; mustered in from August 19 to September 2, 1861; founded and led by Captain John Peter Shindel Gobin from its inception until July 24, 1864 and then by Captain Daniel Oyster until the close of the war.
- Company D: Recruited in Bloomfield, Perry County; mustered in from August 20 to 31, 1861; led by Captain Henry Durant Woodruff from its inception until September 18, 1864; then by Captain George Stroop until June 1, 1865; and then by Captain George W. Kosier until the close of the war.
- Company I: Recruited at Allentown, Lehigh County; mustered in as the largest company with one hundred and two men on August 30, 1861; led by Captain Coleman A.G. Keck from its inception until his resignation on February 22, 1864; then by Captain Levi Stuber from August 1, 1864 until his promotion to the regiment's central command staff at the rank of Major on May 22, 1865; and then by Captain Theodore Mink from May 22, 1865 until the close of the war.
- Company B: Recruited at Allentown, Lehigh County; mustered in from August 30 to 31, 1861; led by Captain Emanuel P. Rhoads from its inception until September 18, 1864; then by Captain Edwin G. Minnich until he was killed in action on October 19, 1864; and then by Captain William H. Kleckner until the close of the war.
- Company A ("Florida Rangers"): Recruited at Easton, Northampton County; mustered in September 15 to 16, 1861; led by Captain Richard A. Graeffe from its inception until September 18, 1864 and then by Captain Adolph Dennig until the end of the war. A group of men from Company A served under Captain Graeffe on special detachment in early 1864. Known as the "Florida Rangers," they were responsible for reinvigorating the federal military installation at Fort Myers, Florida and for raiding cattle from the herds owned by Confederate sympathizers. These cattle were then used to feed the growing number of Union Army troops stationed nearby.
- Company E: Recruited at Easton, Northampton County; mustered in as the smallest company with just eighty-three men on September 16, 1861; led by Captain Charles Hickman Yard, Sr. from its inception until September 18, 1864 and then by Captain William A. Bachman. Captain Yard and his E Company men led the men from the 47th Pennsylvania's Company K as part of a special detachment which participated with other Union Army regiments in the capture of Jacksonville, Florida on October 5, 1862 and in the capture of the Confederate steamer, Gov. Milton, near Hawkinsville on October 6, 1862.
- Company K: Recruited at Allentown, Lehigh County; mustered in on September 17, 1861; led by Captain George Junker from its inception until he was mortally wounded in battle on October 22, 1862; then by Captain Charles W. Abbott from October 22, 1862 until he was promoted to the rank of lieutenant colonel with the regiment's central command staff on January 3, 1865; and then by Captain Matthias Miller from January 4, 1865 until the close of the war. As part of a special detachment, Captain Abbott and Company K engaged in the capture of Jacksonville, Florida with the 47th Pennsylvania's Company E and other Union forces on October 5, 1862, as well as the capture of the Confederate steamer, Gov. Milton, near Hawkinsville on October 6, 1862.
- Company G: Recruited at Allentown, Lehigh County; mustered in on September 18, 1861; led by Captain Charles Mickley from its inception until October 22, 1862 when he was killed in action; then by Captain John J. Goebel until October 19, 1864 when he was also killed in action; and then by Captain Thomas E. Leisenring until the close of the war.
- Company H: Recruited at Newport, Perry County; mustered in on September 19, 1861; led by Captain James Kacy (alternate spelling "Kacey") from its inception until September 18, 1864 and then by Captain Reuben S. Gardner until the close of the war.

== Notable descendants ==
Notable descendants of the 47th Pennsylvania Infantry Regiment include:

- Lewis H. Adler, Jr., M.D., Philadelphia, Pennsylvania surgeon and son of assistant regimental surgeon, Lewis H. Adler, Sr., M.D.
- Edgar W. Alexander, president of Pennsylvania's G. W. Alexander & Co. Hats and son of lieutenant colonel George Warren Alexander
- Louis E. Bernheisel, M.D., homeopathic physician and superintendent of a tuberculosis sanatorium in Colorado and grandson of H Company private Luther Peter Bernheisel
- Richard R. Breneman, colonel, U.S. Army, and grandson of H Company second lieutenant Christian K. Breneman
- Colonel James W. Fuller, III, president of the Allentown Portland Cement Company, Valley Forge Cement Company and the Fuller Company and son of first lieutenant and regimental adjutant James W. Fuller, Jr.
- Rev. Archibald Clinton Harte, International Secretary, Y.M.C.A and son of F Company captain Henry Samuel Harte
- John Hartranft Snyder, co-founder of Pennsylvania's Lavelle Telegraph and Telephone Company and son of C Company corporal Timothy M. Snyder
- Rev. John Moynihan Tettemer, Consulator General, Passionists order of the Roman Catholic Church and nephew of F company corporal Spencer Tettemer
- Frances Rae Whitesell, philanthropist and granddaughter of regimental bandsman Joseph Eugene Walter
- Anna M. Ziegler, M.D., prominent Allentown obstetrician and gynecologist and granddaughter of I Company private Thomas Ziegler

== External resources ==
Key figures associated with the regiment:

- Alexander, George Warren (regimental second in commander and founder, Alexander Hat Co.)
- Catasauqua's Fuller Family (including George W. Fuller, first lieutenant; James W. Fuller, Jr., regimental adjutant and first lieutenant; and Orlando Fuller, private, 47th Pennsylvania Volunteers)
- Coates, Professor Thomas (regimental band leader and the "Father of Band Music in America")
- "Faces of the 47th" (video). 47th Pennsylvania Volunteers: One Civil War Regiment's Story: Retrieved online June 5, 2017.
- Gobin, The Honorable John Peter Shindel (final commanding officer of the regiment and Pennsylvania senator and lieutenant governor)
- Good, Colonel Tilghman H. Good (founder and first commanding officer of the regiment and three-time mayor of Allentown, Pennsylvania)

Key resources for learning more:

- "The Birth of a New Regiment" (video), 47th Pennsylvania Volunteers: One Civil War Regiment's Story, December 19, 2019.
- First and Second State Colors, 47th Pennsylvania Infantry (Battle Flags, Pennsylvania Capitol Preservation Committee).
- Hardee, William Joseph. Hardee's Rifle and Light Infantry Tactics. Memphis, Tennessee: E.C. Kirk & Co., 1861.
- Rosters, 47th Pennsylvania Volunteers, in Registers of Pennsylvania Volunteers, 1861-1865, Vol. 3: 40th-52nd Regiments (3 Years Service), Series #19.65, Record Group 19, Records of the Department of Military and Veterans' Affairs, Pennsylvania State Archives.
