= Camp Scott (Pennsylvania) =

Union Army base in York, Pennsylvania, US

Camp Scott (renamed "Camp Franklin", c. 1863)
- Part of United States Army (Union)
- Fairgrounds, York, Pennsylvania

Site information
- Type: recruiting and training base

Site history
- Built: April 1861
- In use: 1861-1865
- Demolished: 1865

Camp Scott was a recruiting and training base in York, Pennsylvania, for newly raised regiments in the Union Army during the American Civil War.

Following the secession of several southern states and the bombardment of Fort Sumter in South Carolina in April 1861, President Abraham Lincoln called for volunteers to suppress the rebellion. In response to this summons to arms, eager volunteers throughout the North flocked to recruiting stations in larger towns to enlist in the military, many in regiments that were originally intended to serve only for three months. Many believed that would be the maximum amount of time it would take before the Confederacy collapsed.

The country was unprepared for the onslaught of volunteers, and the U.S. Army hastily began establishing training sites where these new recruits could be organized into formal units and subsequently trained in military tactics and drills. A wide series of regional camps and bases were established across the North. One such camp was located immediately east of downtown York, a center of commerce and transportation for south-central Pennsylvania. The York Agricultural Society allowed the army to use its fairgrounds as the new base, which was named Camp Scott in honor of General Winfield Scott. Dozens of new regiments arrived over the first few months for training before moving further southward to their field assignments. At its peak in late May 1861, the camp held between 6,000 and 7,000 new soldiers, organized into the following division of brigades:

Military rank

- MG = Major General
- BG = Brigadier General
- Col = Colonel

MG William H. Keim, commanding

Brigade	Regiments and Others
2nd Brigade; BG George C. Wynkoop	1st Pennsylvania: Col Samuel Yohe; 2nd Pennsylvania: Col Frederick S. Stumbaugh; 3rd Pennsylvania: Col Francis P. Minier; 9th Pennsylvania: Col Henry C. Longnecker; 16th Pennsylvania: Col Thomas A. Ziegle
3rd Brigade; BG Edward C. Williams	7th Pennsylvania: Col William H. Irwin; 8th Pennsylvania: Col Anthony H. Emley; 10th Pennsylvania: Col Sullivan A. Meredith; 11th Pennsylvania: Col Phaon Jarret
4th Brigade; BG James S. Negley	12th Pennsylvania: Col D. Campbell; 13th Pennsylvania: Col Thomas A. Rowley; 14th Pennsylvania: Col John W. Johnston; 15th Pennsylvania: Col Richard A. Oakford

As the war progressed, Camp Scott was renamed Camp Franklin in honor of York native William B. Franklin, a prominent corps commander in the Army of the Potomac. During the 1863 Gettysburg campaign, Camp Franklin was occupied for two days by a Confederate brigade under Colonel Isaac E. Avery.

Following the war, the camp was decommissioned and the grounds restored to the Agricultural Society for the resumption of their annual fairs. Eventually the fair moved to a new location west of York, and the site of Camp Scott was swallowed up in urban expansion.
