= James A. Ekin =

Union Army general (1819–1891)

James Adams Ekin
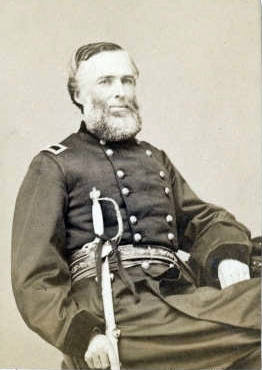
- Bvt Brig. Gen. James Adams Ekin c. 1865
- Born: August 31, 1819; Pittsburgh, Pennsylvania, U.S.
- Died: March 27, 1891 (aged 71); Louisville, Kentucky, U.S.
- Burial place: Cave Hill National Cemetery; Louisville, Kentucky, U.S.
- Spouse: Diana Craighead Walker
- Children: 5
- Military career
- Allegiance: United States
- Service years: 1861–1883
- Rank: Colonel; Brevet Brigadier General
- Commands: Chief Quartermaster, Cavalry Corps, Army of the Potomac
- Conflicts: American Civil War

James Adams Ekin (August 31, 1819 – March 27, 1891) was an American officer who served in the Union Army in the American Civil War. He achieved fame as a member of the military commission trying the conspirators involved with the assassination of President Abraham Lincoln.

== Early life ==
Ekin was born August 31, 1819, in Pittsburgh, Pennsylvania, to James and Susan Burling (Bayard) Ekin. His mother was a daughter of Colonel Stephen A. Bayard of the Continental Army. He served an apprenticeship as a steamboat builder, which eventually led to his first career as a steamboat builder in Pittsburgh.

== Civil War ==
At the outbreak of the Civil War, Ekin enlisted April 25, 1861 in the 12th Pennsylvania Infantry (a 3-month regiment) as a lieutenant and was assigned regimental quartermaster. Ekin mustered out with the regiment on August 5, 1861, at Harrisburg, Pennsylvania. He was subsequently promoted captain and assistant quartermaster August 7, 1861 and served in the Quartermaster's Department. Ekin and was promoted to lieutenant colonel February 15, 1864, then promoted again to colonel August 2, 1864. He was brevetted in the regular army major, lieutenant colonel, colonel and brigadier general, all on March 13, 1865. In addition to his volunteer ranks, Ekin was made a captain in the regular army March 13, 1863, lieutenant colonel and deputy quartermaster general July 29, 1865.

== Lincoln assassination trial ==
Despite his excellent service in the Army quartermaster department, Ekin is remembered largely for his participation as a member of the military tribunal that heard the case against eight conspirators in the assassination of President Lincoln.

== Post-war service ==
Ekin remained in the U.S. Army following the Civil War with the rank of lieutenant colonel and deputy quartermaster general until February 13, 1882, when he was promoted to colonel. He retired from the Army on August 31, 1883.

== Posts ==
Ekin served at Pittsburgh, as acting assistant commissary of subsistence in 1861; at Indianapolis, Indiana, as assistant quartermaster, 1861–1863; at Washington, D.C., as quartermaster of the cavalry bureau, 1863–1864; as chief quartermaster of the Cavalry Corps, Army of the Potomac, in 1864; as officer in charge of the 1st division, Quartermaster General's Office, Washington, D.C., 1864–1870; as chief quartermaster of the 5th District, Department of Texas, Department of the South, and Department of Louisville, Kentucky until his retirement.

== Family ==
Ekin married Diana Craighead Walker and together they had five children: James Adams (1844–1847), Nancy Walker (1845–1868), Mary Elizabeth (1847–1934), Susan Bayard (1849), and William Moody (1853–1907). Mary Elizabeth Ekin married Augustus Everett Willson July 23, 1877, who served as the 36th Governor of Kentucky, 1907–1911. William M. Ekin followed in his father's career and joined the U.S. Army, rising to the rank of captain in the Quartermaster's Department.

Ekin died March 27, 1891, in Louisville, Kentucky and was buried in Cave Hill National Cemetery.

== In popular culture ==
Eakin is portrayed in the film The Conspirator (2010) by actor John Deifer.

== See also ==
- List of American Civil War brevet generals (Union)
