= 1st Nebraska Infantry Regiment (1861) =

- Nebraska state flag
- Active: June 11, 1861, to November 6, 1863
- Country: United States
- Allegiance: Union
- Branch: Infantry
- Engagements: Battle of Fort Donelson; Battle of Shiloh; Siege of Corinth

The 1st Nebraska Infantry Regiment was an infantry regiment that served in the Union Army during the American Civil War. It was initially organized to protect the Nebraska Territory from Indian attacks, but primarily served in the Western Theater before being reorganized and sent to the frontier.

== Service ==
When the war started, U.S. Regular Army troops were withdrawn from Fort Kearny and Fort Randall to serve in more threatened areas, but at the increased risk to Nebraska settlers from Indian attacks. The Federal government requested that the Nebraska Territory form one volunteer regiment, with some companies supposed to stay behind to protect the territory. The territorial legislature met in special session in Omaha, and agreed to raise the requested local defense force. Thus, the 1st Nebraska Infantry Regiment was organized at Omaha, between June 11 and July 21, 1861, with the future governor of Nebraska and the Wyoming Territory, John Milton Thayer, as its first colonel. However, the promise was reneged, and the regiment was sent eastward in August to fight the Confederacy. The regiment camped at various sites in Missouri, including Pilot Knob, throughout the fall and winter of 1861–1862.

After joining the Union forces under Ulysses S. Grant, the 1st Nebraska Infantry participated in the successful attack on Fort Donelson in Tennessee, fought at the Battle of Shiloh in April 1862, and took part in the Union advance on, and siege of, Corinth, Mississippi. The unit then participated in several minor engagements in Missouri and Arkansas. The regiment was redesignated the 1st Nebraska Cavalry Regiment on November 6, 1863. It was transferred to the frontier to keep the Plains Indians in check. It was amalgamated with the 1st Nebraska Veteran Cavalry Battalion in 1865, and mustered out of the Union Army in 1866.

== Total strength and casualties ==
A total of 1370 men served in the 1st Nebraska Infantry/Cavalry.

== Commanders ==
- Colonel John Milton Thayer
- Lieutenant Colonel William McCord (commanded at the battles of Fort Donelson and Shiloh)
- Lieutenant Colonel Robert Livingston (commanded at the siege of Corinth)

== See also ==
- List of Nebraska Civil War Units
- Nebraska in the American Civil War
