= 2nd Nebraska Cavalry Regiment =

- Nebraska state flag
- Active: October 23, 1862, to December 23, 1863
- Country: United States
- Allegiance: Union
- Branch: Cavalry
- Engagements: Sully's Expedition (1863–1864): Battle of Whitestone Hill

The 2nd Nebraska Cavalry Regiment was a cavalry regiment that served in the Union Army during the American Civil War.

== Service ==
The 2nd Nebraska Cavalry Regiment was initially organized at Omaha, Nebraska, on October 23, 1862, as a nine-month regiment, and served for over one year. They were attached to General Sully's command, who was in a campaign against Indians in Western Nebraska and Dakota, who were forced to move south from Minnesota following the Dakota War of 1862.

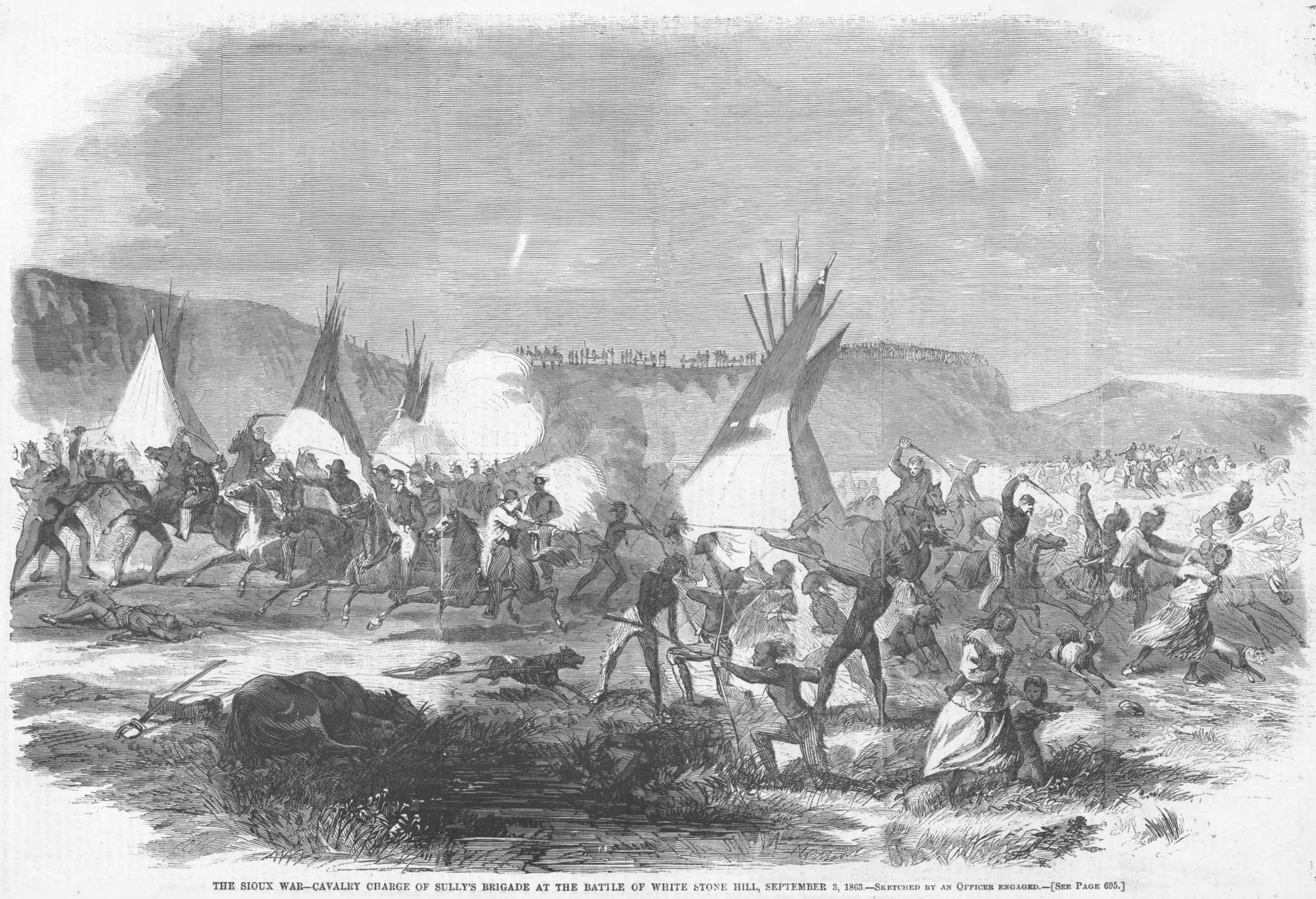
Battle of Whitestone Hill, 3 Sept 1863

=== Battle of Whitestone Hill ===
The 2nd Nebraska participated in the Battle of Whitestone Hill, which began on September 3, 1863, when General Sully's troops engaged upwards of 2,000 warriors under Chief Two Bears of the Yanktonai Sioux. Of the twenty US troopers killed in the battle, seven were from the Second Nebraska. Fourteen from the unit were also wounded in the action.

The regiment was mustered out December 23, 1863. A number of its veterans were re-enlisted in the 1st Nebraska Veteran Cavalry Battalion, which served until 1865 when it was merged with the 1st Nebraska Cavalry Regiment.

== Total strength and casualties ==
1,384 men were enlisted in the regiment.

== Commanders ==
- Colonel Robert Wilkinson Furnas

== See also ==
- List of Nebraska Civil War Units
- Nebraska in the American Civil War
