= 1st Nebraska Cavalry Regiment =

- Active: October 11, 1863, to July 1, 1866
- Disbanded: July 1866
- Country: United States
- Allegiance: Union
- Branch: Cavalry
- Size: Regiment
- Engagements: American Civil War

Commanders
- Notable commanders: Colonel Robert Ramsay Livingston; Colonel William Baumer

The 1st Nebraska Cavalry Regiment was a cavalry regiment that served in the Union Army during the American Civil War.

== Service ==
The 1st Nebraska Cavalry Regiment was created from the 1st Nebraska Infantry on October 11, 1863. The regiment was commanded by Colonel Robert Ramsay Livingston. It was later designated 1st Nebraska Veteran Cavalry on July 10, 1865, after being consolidated with 1st Battalion Nebraska Volunteer Cavalry.

The regiment was attached to District of Southeast Missouri, Department of the Missouri, to November 1864. District of Northeast Arkansas, Department of the Missouri, to January 1864. District Northeast Arkansas, VII Corps, to May 1864. 3rd Brigade, 2nd Division, VII Corps, Department of Arkansas, to October 1864. 4th Brigade, Cavalry Division, VII Corps, to October 1864. District of Nebraska and District of the Plains, to July 1866.

The 1st Nebraska Cavalry mustered out of service on July 1, 1866.

== Detailed service ==
- 1863
- 1st Nebraska Cavalry was created October 11, 1863.
- Duty at St. Louis, Mo., until November 30.
- Moved to Batesville, Ark., November 30-December 25, 1863.
- 1864
- Operations in northeastern Arkansas January 1–30, 1864.
  - Action at Black River January 18.
  - Jacksonport January 19.
  - Expedition after Freeman's forces January 23–30.
  - Sylamore Creek January 23 (detachment).
  - Sylamore January 24.
- Scout to Pocohontas February 9–20.
  - Morgan's Mills, Spring River, February 9.
  - Pocohontas February 10.
- Expedition from Batesville after Freeman's forces February 12–20.
  - Spring River, near Smithfield, February 13.
- Expedition to Wild Haws, Strawberry Creek, etc., March 10–12.
- Scout from Batesville to Fairview March 25–26.
- Spring River, near Smithville, April 13 (detachment).
- Moved to Jacksonport, Ark., April 17–19.
- Attack on Jacksonport April 20.
- Expedition to Augusta April 22–24.
- Near Jacksonport April 24.
- Moved to Duvall's Bluff May 25–30.
- Veterans on furlough June 10 to August 13.

The First Nebraska Cavalry had "veteran volunteered," as it was called. After a person had served in the field eighteen months, then he could "veteranize," as it was said, and enlist for three years longer and get a bounty of $300, so that soldiers and sometimes regiments "veteranized." The First Nebraska was a regiment in which the men had veteranized to such an extent that it was reorganized as a veteran regiment, and bore the name of veteran volunteer in the title of the regiment. The incursions of the Indians, and the vast damages which they had done in Nebraska, raised such an outcry that the Government had to send Nebraska troops home for the protection of Nebraska, the same as a portion of our regiment was stationed in Iowa. And so it happened that the "First Nebraska Veteran Volunteer Cavalry" was drawn from the field, and the Confederacy, and sent out to fight Indians in the Northwest. The 7th Iowa Cavalry and the First Nebraska got along together very well.

- Left Omaha for Fort Kearney, Nebraska, August 15, arriving there August 23, 1864.
- Operations against Indians in Nebraska and Colorado until July 1866, participating in numerous affairs with hostile Indians at Plum Creek, Spring Ranch, Julesburg, Mud Springs, Elm Creek and Smith's Ranch. Also engaged in scout and escort duty.
- 1865
- Operations on overland stage route between Denver and Julesburg, Colorado, January 14–25, 1865.
- Operations on North Platte River, Colo., February 2–18.
- Scout from Dakota City April 12–16 and April 22–27 (detachments).
- Scout from Fort Laramie to Wind River, Nebraska., May 3–21 (detachment),
- Scout from Plum Creek to Medway Station, Wind River, Nebraska., May 8–20 (detachment).
- Scout from Fort Kearney to Little Blue River, Nebraska, May 9-June 2 (detachment).
- Scout from Cottonwood May 12–14 (1st Battalion).
- Scout from Plum Creek, Nebraska., May 26–27 (detachment).
- Expedition to Platte and Mojave Rivers, Nebraska., June 12-July 5 (detachment).
- 1866
- Mustered out July 1, 1866.

== Commanders ==
- Colonel Robert Ramsay Livingston
- Colonel William Baumer

== See also ==
- List of Nebraska Civil War Units
- Nebraska in the American Civil War
