= Stephen D. Richards =

Old West serial killer (1856–1879)

- Portrait photograph, c. 1870s (Note: Authenticated photograph of Richards, the exact date is unknown and the current whereabouts of the physical copy have been lost.)
- Born: Stephen Decatur Richards; March 18, 1856; Wheeling, Virginia, US (Note: A biography published shortly after his execution claimed that he was born in Ohio.)
- Died: April 26, 1879 (aged 23); Minden, Nebraska, U.S.
- Other names: Dick Richardson; D. J. Roberts; George Gallagher; F. A. Hoge; J. Littleton; W. A. Littleton; William Hudson; Stephen Dee Richards; Samuel D. Richards; Stephen Lee Richards; S. D. Richards
- Status: Executed by hanging
- Conviction: First-degree murder (x5)
- Criminal charge: First-degree murder (x9)
- Penalty: Death

Details
- Victims: 6 confirmed, 9 confessed, 12 suspected
- Span of crimes: 1876–1878
- Country: United States
- States: Nebraska; Iowa; Ohio
- Date apprehended: December 20, 1878

Stephen Decatur Richards (Note: While many newspaper accounts have given different names, modern reports suggest his real name was Stephen Decatur Richards. Alternate names reported have been Samuel D. Richards, Stephen Dee Richards, Stephen Lee Richards, (Note: Attributed to multiple sources:) and S.D. Richards.) (March 18, 1856 – April 26, 1879), known by the nicknames The Nebraska Fiend and The Ohio Monster, was an American mass murderer, outlaw, and serial killer who committed nine to twelve murders in Nebraska and Iowa between 1876 and 1878.

Richards was born in West Virginia (then part of Virginia) in 1856. His family later moved to Ohio, and eventually settled in the Quaker village of Mount Pleasant. In 1876, Richards left his home and headed westward to seek his fortune. For a time, he found work at a local asylum; he claimed that during his time there, he lost all empathy for other people. When Richards later confessed to his crimes, he claimed to have committed his first murder sometime in late 1876, two weeks after arriving in Kearney, Nebraska. He went on to commit several other murders, which he later claimed were done in self-defense. Richards fled after murdering Mary L. Harlson and her three children, but was captured in Mount Pleasant. In 1879, he was convicted of the murders of the Harlson family, as well as the killing of neighbor Peter Anderson, and hanged.

Richards was regarded as handsome and charismatic by some contemporary chroniclers, who described his appearance and behavior as completely obscuring his nature as a cold-blooded killer. Many observed that he displayed a complete lack of remorse for his crimes and indifference toward his execution. Modern-day forensic psychologist Katherine Ramsland has written that these characteristics were also displayed by serial killer Ted Bundy, and she has referred to Richards as The Old West's Ted Bundy.

The nature of Richards' crimes and his behavior after his capture led to a brief period of notoriety, as Richards was widely talked about in the media at the time. Richards has been featured in a handful of books and periodicals, including a posthumous biography, based on an interview conducted after his final arrest. The biography, which also included entries on other criminals of the time, was published in 1879 by the Nebraska State Journal. In modern times he is known as Nebraska's first documented serial killer in Nebraska and the first person to be executed by the state.

== Background ==
In the mid-19th century, Nebraska experienced a period of territorial expansion in the wake of the Kansas-Nebraska Act of 1854, which saw the creation of Nebraska and Kansas territories to facilitate the construction of the Transcontinental railroad. In 1867, Nebraska was admitted into the Union as the 37th state, two years after the conclusion of the American Civil War. Nebraska's newfound statehood led to an influx of settlers; among the growing population and political controversies incited by the state's first governor David Butler, renewed calls for a state constitution were made in 1871. During Richards' crime spree and trial, Nebraska's law and justice system had only recently been developed, with the state's criminal code written into state law in 1871. Before his execution, the state had only one recorded execution, in 1863, four years before its inclusion into the United States.

== Early and young adult life ==
Stephen Decatur Richards was born in Wheeling, Virginia, on March 18, 1856. He was said to have had five sisters and a brother. When Richards was six, his family relocated to Ohio; first to Monroe County, and then to Noble County. The family later settled in the Quaker village of Mount Pleasant in Ohio when he was eleven. Richards described his mother as a devout Methodist, and his father, a farmer, as having "made no profession of religion". Richards attended school in Mount Pleasant; he claimed that the teachers considered him well behaved. At his mother's insistence, he also attended Sunday school and church regularly.

Up until the age of twenty, Richards lived with his parents, working for farmers and other locals in the area. On September 16, 1871, Richards' mother died of an unknown cause. At the age of 20, Richards met and became engaged to a young woman named Anna Millhorne, with whom he corresponded with during his later travels. Richards also met men whom he described as being of "questionable occupation"; he began passing counterfeit bills he obtained from a man in New York City. In February 1876, he left Mount Pleasant, heading west for better career opportunities.

For a short time, Richards lived in Iowa, and worked as a farmhand in Burlington and Morning Sun. He was later hired as an attendant at the Iowa Lunatic Asylum in Mount Pleasant, Iowa; tasked with burying deceased patients. The New York Times wrote that Richards' time working at the asylum was a significant event in his life that shaped his own humanity and view of the human race. While he denied witnessing any abuse of the asylum's patients, he later reflected that during his tenure of handling and disposing of deceased patients, he became accustomed to viewing people as 'nothing more than meat'.

Richards left the asylum in October 1876, and began drifting around the Midwestern United States, finding intermittent work and occasionally consorting with train robbers. He stayed in Kansas City briefly before he moved to Nebraska, where he passed through Hastings before arriving in Kearney, residing there for two to three weeks before leaving for Cheyenne County. According to Richards, he became involved in several gunfights during his stay, that resulted in him shooting each individual, although he stated he was unaware of their condition after each confrontation. During this period, Richards went under the name William Hudson, and later discarded this once he reached Kansas City.

== Murders ==
=== Early murders ===
In a confession written after his final arrest, Richards admitted to having killed four men during his travels around Nebraska and Iowa between 1876 and 1877. He described committing his first murder sometime in late 1876, two weeks after arriving in Kearney.

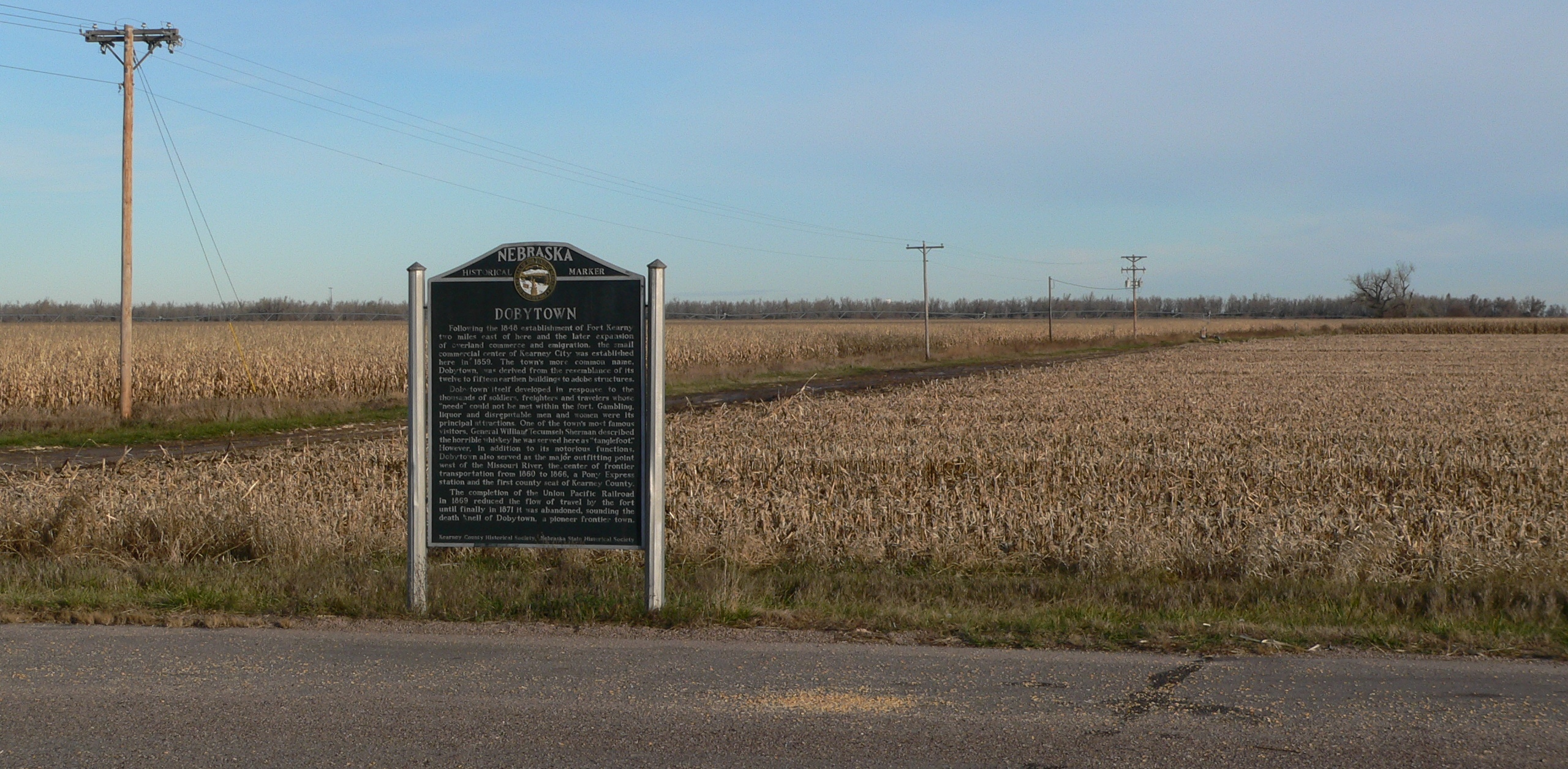
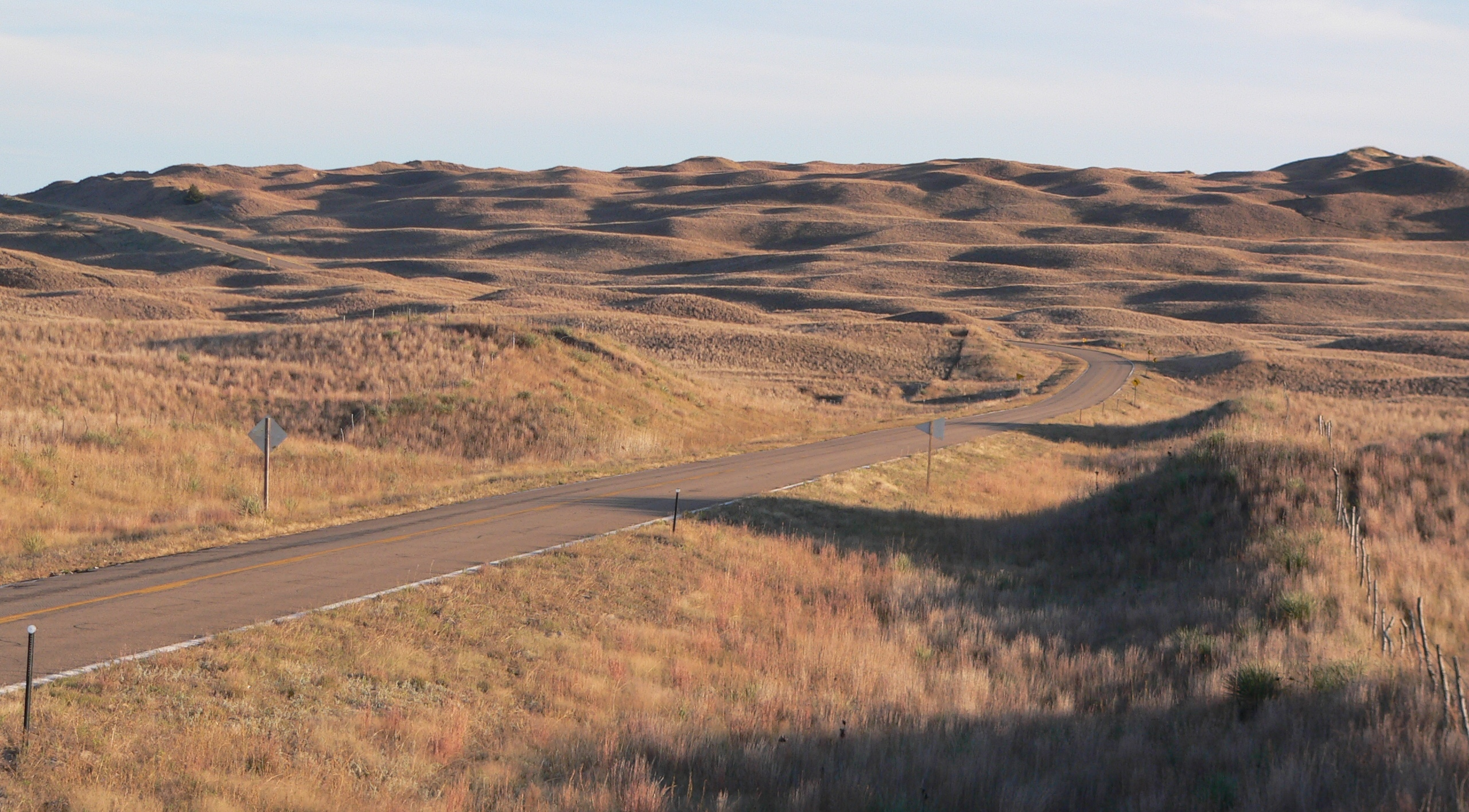
Contemporary newspaper reports of the site of Richards' first murder varied, some saying it was near Dobytown (above), and others giving it as near Sand Hills (below).

According to Richards, he met a man while traveling on horseback through the Nebraska countryside, and the pair decided to camp for the night near Dobytown. (Several newspapers reported that the two men's campsite was instead near Sand Hills.) (Note: Attributed to multiple references:) Settling down for the night, the two began gambling in a game of cards, with Richards winning most of the stranger's money. As the two set off for Kearney the following morning, the other man turned on Richards and demanded his money back. Richards refused, whereupon, he claimed, the other man became belligerent. Richards then shot him above the left eye, killing him instantly. After confirming the man was dead, he disposed of the body in the Platte River.

Several days later, as he continued his trek to Kearney, Richards encountered another man fifteen miles from an area called Walker's Ranch. The man had seen Richards and the previous traveler together, and the stranger asked what had become of that man. While talking to him, Richards realized that this man and the deceased were friends and business partners. (Note: In his confession, Richards said the man had identified the murder victim as John, but Richards was unable to find out the dead man's surname; however, it was given as Crawford in an article published ten days after Richards' execution.) Richards denied any knowledge of the dead man, but his friend continued to hound Richards with questions, which caused Richards to become increasingly anxious. Believing the man knew too much, Richards decided to kill the stranger to prevent any discovery of the murder. When the stranger turned his back to Richards, he was shot in the back of the head. He disposed of the corpse and sold the man's horse in a nearby town. Before reaching Kearney, Richards stopped at the home of Jasper Harlson, (Note: The surname is spelled Harlson in the transcript of Richards' confession. Other sources give different spellings, including Harrison, Harleson, Haralson and Harrelson.) who, according to Richards, was a train robber. Mary, Jasper's wife, noticed upon his arrival that Richards' shirt was stained with blood, and commented on it. Richards had not noticed blood on his clothes, and claimed to have replied, as if in jest, that it must have come from the men he had murdered. That ended the conversation.

After his stay, Richards traveled to Cedar Rapids, Iowa, where he used counterfeit money to purchase a horse and buggy from an unidentified man. After he left, the seller discovered the bills were not genuine. Tracking Richards down, the seller demanded that Richards give him real money or return his horse and buggy. With Richards refusing both demands, the man threatened to have him arrested, and Richards responded by shooting him. He then buried the body and left the area.

In March 1877, Richards and a young man with the surname Gemge left Grand Island, Nebraska, on horseback and headed towards Kearney. As they neared their destination, they stopped and camped for the night between Lowell and Kearney, along the Platte River. Richards woke up at about 3:00 a.m. and roused his partner, telling him it was nearly morning and they should get back on the road. Gemge, infuriated at being awakened so early, began arguing with Richards. The argument continued, as Richards later recounted:

"It's a good thing you don't mean all you say," I said. "But I do mean it," he said. "You don't want to mean it," I said; and he picked up his revolver and said, "Here is something that backs all that I say," cocked it. I looked at him, and thought, "The fool acts as if he means to shoot," and skipping out my little 33 I plugged him one in the head. That was the first trouble we had ever had.

After leaving the area, Richards arrived at Kearney, registering under the name F.A. Hoge at the local hotel. During his stay, Richards reunited with several old acquaintances George "Dutch Henry" Johnson, and his companion Hurst, as well as a man who went by the name Mr. Burns. On March 21, Richards was arrested along with Burns, whom he had been spending most of his time with. At the time, both men were not told as to the reason for their arrest, although Richards came to suspect that it was for the murder of Gemge. It was only later that they were notified by the authorities that they were under suspicion for murder of a man named Peter Geteway, whom Richards claimed his innocence over. Although Richards was soon acquitted, Burns was held in custody because of a testimony of a "sporting lady" whom he had previously been acquainted with. Burns would also be acquitted sometime later after no evidence was found linking him to the crime.

=== Murders of the Harlson family ===
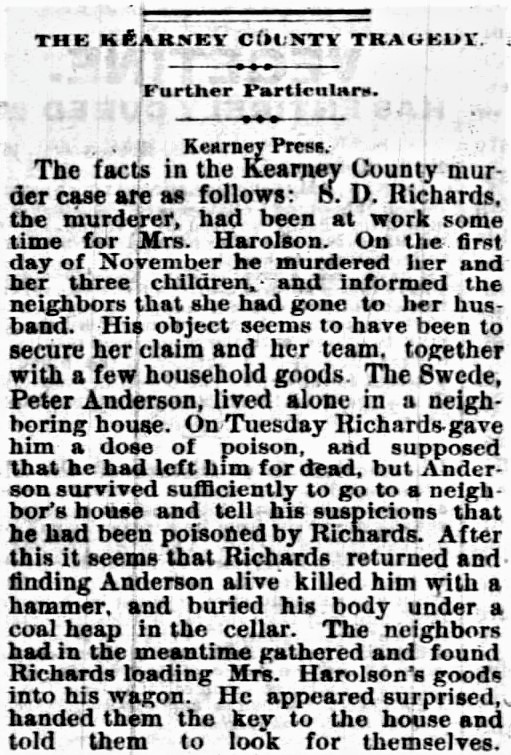
Newspaper coverage of the Harlson family (spelled as 'Harolson' in this account) and Anderson murders

In June 1878, while in Kearney, Richards was arrested and jailed for larceny. He later claimed that this charge was unfounded. During his time in jail, he reunited with Mary L. Harlson. Shortly before Richards' arrival, she had been arrested under suspicion of having aided the escape of her husband and another prisoner, named Underwood or Nixon, from the Kearney jail. Richards and Mary Harlson agreed that she would sell him the deed to her property six months later, for $600 ($17,000 in 2024).

After Richards was released from jail, he traveled around Nebraska for several months. He did business in Hastings, Bloomington, and Grand Island before arriving at the Harlsons' Kearney County homestead on October 18, 1878. Mary Harlson transferred the property to Richards upon his arrival, and he stayed there for several weeks. The New York Daily Herald later reported that Richards had married Harlson on November 2, in what the newspaper alleged was a scam to acquire ownership of Harlson's land. A month later, Richards decided to kill Harlson and her three children—ten-year-old Daisy, four-year-old Mabel, and two-year-old Jasper, nicknamed "Jesse". In his confession, Richards claimed that Harlson had discovered that he was guilty of murder, and he feared that she might betray his presence to the authorities. To silence Harlson, and ensure that his previous crimes remained hidden, Richards resolved to murder the entire family.

On November 3, 1878, Richards got up early in the morning, along with another man named Brown, who had been staying at the house. Brown left to feed the horses and complete other chores around the farm. Richards found a spade and dug a hole, then sneaked back into the house and murdered Mary, Daisy, Mabel, and Jesse with an ax. According to one report, Mary and one of the children were murdered with a smoothing iron, while the other two were physically assaulted. This claim was also reported by some modern-day sources, who graphically described Richards killing Jasper by bashing his head against the wall. However, these alternate details of the murders were refuted by Richards himself, saying he had killed the family while they were asleep. He said most of them had died after the first several blows, with the exception of Daisy, who had "writhed in pain for some time" by Richards' own account. Richards was said to have scrubbed the blood off of the floor and himself after the murders, before calmly sitting down to breakfast. After he had eaten, he carried the bodies out of the house and buried them in the hole he had dug nearby. When later questioned about the Harlsons' disappearance, Richards told several people the family had left with Brown, and he did not know when they would return. A 21st-century account stated Richards had made claims of Harlson transferring the deed of the farm to him, and subsequently left with her children, to reunite with her husband. The bodies of Harlson and her children were discovered on December 11. Some reports said they had been concealed underneath a haystack, rather than buried, as Richards had later claimed.

=== Murder of Peter Anderson ===
On December 9, 1878, Richards agreed to help his neighbor, a 26-year-old immigrant from Sweden named Peter Anderson, with some work on Anderson's property. The Columbus Journal reported that Richards had used the alias "Dick Richardson" when working for Anderson. On December 9, Anderson became ill after eating a meal Richards had prepared, causing him to suspect Richards had poisoned him. Anderson informed a neighbor of his suspicions. The next day, he confronted Richards; the two fought, and Richards beat Anderson to death with either a hammer or hatchet, (Note: Attributed to multiple references:) or shot him (contemporary newspaper accounts vary). Anderson's body was later discovered in the cellar of his house, buried underneath a pile of coal. Richards strongly denied poisoning Anderson, saying that was not his style. He claimed Anderson had attacked him with a knife and that he killed Anderson in self-defense. Anderson was later buried at the Bethany Cemetery in Axtell, Nebraska.

== On the run ==
Richards fled Kearney shortly after Anderson's murder, expecting that the bodies would soon be discovered. In the evening, as he was hitching up Anderson's horses and preparing to leave, some of Anderson's neighbors arrived. They had noticed Anderson's absence and questioned Richards about it. He reportedly told them Anderson was inside the house. As Anderson's neighbors entered the dwelling, Richards fled on horseback, riding to Bloomington. (Note: Attributed to multiple references:) He traveled east, by horse and train and on foot, passing through Omaha and Chicago. (Note: An article in the Lincoln Journal Star claimed that he fled instead to Red Cloud, and traveled to Chicago by way of Hastings. The article also stated that he used the alias "Samuel Richards" during his flight.) While on the run, he met up with Jasper Harlson and Harlson's fellow escaped prisoner. The three traveled through Wheeling, West Virginia, and into Ohio, passing through Bridgeport, before arriving in Richards' hometown of Mount Pleasant. Nebraska Governor Silas Garber issued an arrest warrant for Richards on December 16, 1878, and promised a reward of $200 ($6,000 in 2024) for his arrest and conviction.

=== Capture ===
Most accounts state that on December 20, after Richards arrived in Mount Pleasant, he attended a ballroom dance, accompanied by two unidentified women. Copies of a wanted poster featuring Richards had been circulated throughout the town recently, and a constable named McGrew recognized him from the poster. He enlisted the help of a penitentiary guard named Folge; the two men armed themselves with shotguns and set off after Richards. They found him walking through a field just outside of town with the two women. He was unarmed and quickly surrendered. Richards claimed that he had spotted the officers approaching him; intending to fight his way out of the situation, he told the women to head back to town. They refused, however, so Richards chose to surrender. He said that if the women had left, he would have avoided arrest:

If I hadn't had the two girls with me, I guess the constable, McGrew, who arrested me, would have been a dead man—either of us would, for I'd have shot.

Richards said that if he had escaped, he would have gone to Nebraska as he reasoned that it was the last place anyone would look for him.

Some accounts differed about the date and place of Richards' arrest. The Wheeling Daily Intelligencer said that, upon arriving in a town near Mount Pleasant, Richards was identified by a former acquaintance, who detained him with the help of another person. One source claims that Richards was arrested in early 1879 in Austin, Texas. One modern-day account reported that Richards, whom they listed under the name Samuel Richards, had been identified and captured by Pinkerton agents. There were even conflicting descriptions of Richards' appearance. Newspapers described him as being approximately six feet two inches tall and "heavily built", with dark hair and blue eyes. However, the account of a Dr. Moreland, who performed a phrenological examination of Richards before his execution, (Note: Phrenology supposedly predicts a person's mental traits by measuring bumps on the skull; influential in the 19th century, it is now considered pseudoscience.) conflicted with these descriptions of him. In his examination report, Moreland said Richards had light brown hair and dark gray eyes. At his execution, one spectator later described Richards as having steel grey eyes that were almost bluish in color and dark brown hair.

The Workingman's Friend, a Leavenworth, Kansas newspaper, reported that Chicago authorities received part of the reward.

After his arrest, Richards was jailed in Steubenville, Ohio. While there, he wrote two articles for the local newspaper, confessing to nine murders in three years. Sheriff David Anderson of Buffalo County, Nebraska, and Sheriff Martin of Kearney County, (Note: One source listed Anderson and a Simon C. Ayer.) both of whom had pursued Richards to Ohio, returned him to Nebraska. Due to local public outrage, Anderson and Martin feared that Richards would be lynched if he were returned to any of the localities where he had committed his crimes, so it was decided to avoid taking him to these places initially.

At the time of Richards' arrest, authorities suspected he was a member of a gang of outlaws who had plagued the state, or even the group's leader. Law enforcement was able to definitively link Richards to the nine murders to which he had confessed, and suggested that he might have killed even more. something The Nebraska State Journal expressed doubt on.

Shortly before his trial, Richards predicted that he would be convicted and hanged for his crimes. He was moved to a jail in Omaha on December 28, then transferred to Kearney by train. On December 30, a large crowd of enraged townsfolk gathered outside of the jail in Kearney where Richards was being kept. Fearing a lynching, authorities took "extra precautions" to ensure Richards' safety, as well as their own. While being moved to the depot, Richards was said to have been impressed by the large crowd, asking whether the whole town was there to see him. Eventually, the crowd dispersed and there were no further incidents during the rest of his stay in Kearney.

== Trial ==
Richards' trial began on January 16, 1879, in Minden, Nebraska, with Judge William Gaslin presiding. The prosecution was led by a district attorney named Scofield, and Richards' defense was led by a lawyer named Savage. Scofield laid out three indictments for murder in the first degree, for the killings of the Harlson family and Anderson. Richards pled not guilty, arguing that Anderson's killing was in self-defense, and therefore justifiable. The prosecution called seven witnesses to the stand. They all testified to the state in which Anderson was found. Richards then was called to testify. When questioned by Scofield, he admitted to killing Anderson with a hammer after a heated argument but reiterated that he had done so in self-defense. Richards said that, although repeatedly warned not to do so, Anderson had reached for a nearby hatchet. The prosecution then entered into evidence the hammer that had been used to kill Anderson. Richards identified it as the murder weapon.

After two hours of deliberation, the jury found Richards guilty of the murders of the Harlsons and Anderson. He was sentenced to death by hanging, and his execution date was set for April 26, 1879. Richards was described as being "cheerful and indifferent" to both the proceedings and his conviction. The Sedalia Weekly Bazoo reported that, shortly after his conviction, Richards managed to smuggle a knife into his cell, to use it for killing himself, but the weapon was discovered by the authorities, and confiscated before he could use it. No other newspaper records corroborate this story, however.

== Execution ==
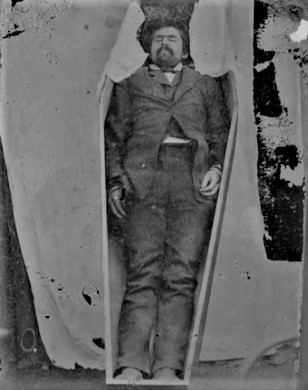
Post-mortem photograph of Richards taken shortly after his execution

When Richards was returned to Nebraska, the Omaha Herald wrote that he "manifested supreme indifference to his lot, was perfectly willing to be brought direct to Kearney Junction and said he had as soon died one way as another." After Richards' conviction, Sheriff Martin announced that his execution in Minden would be open to the public, even though Martin feared the attendance of a large number of spectators could become violent. To prevent a riot, an enclosure was constructed around the gallows to separate the expected crowd from Richards. However, tickets that allowed admittance into the restricted area were sold. Richards was allowed to invite people; he chose members of the press whom he had befriended while in prison. One such ticket of admittance was recently discovered and is now in the collection of the Nebraska Historical Society.

Spectators at the execution were said to have numbered between 2,000 and 25,000. As the crowd became increasingly agitated, the authorities pleaded with them to stay outside the enclosure, but guards were unable to prevent the spectators from destroying the barrier. One witness in the incident, a man named Rolf Johnson, later wrote that twenty to thirty people in the crowd cut the rope as the authorities tried to stop the crowd. The mob proceeded to pull the posts out of the ground, attempting to drag the makeshift barrier away while the guards were pulling the rope at the other end in what Johnson described as a "tug of war". The mob succeeded in pulling the rope away from the guards, and then proceeded to destroy the barrier completely. At 1:00 p.m., Richards was led to the gallows by Martin and his deputy; this pacified the crowd. Upon ascending the gallows, Richards launched into an impassioned defense of his actions. He again claimed that the killing of Anderson was in self-defense, and disavowed any involvement in the murders of the Harlson family; he claimed that he was the victim of a "wrongful conviction". He then said he had found the Lord, "made [his] peace with God", and "had faith in Christ", and asked the crowd to join him in singing the hymn "Come Thou Fount of Every Blessing". One such spectator documenting the events of the execution in his journal, observed that Richards appeared calm and collected during the entire ordeal. Richards' final words were said to have been "Jesus be with me now!" (Note: A contemporary report recorded Richards' last words being "Sheriff meet me in Heaven".) Reverend W. Sanford Gee, who presided over the execution, later told reporters he hoped Richards' professions of religious salvation were genuine, but allowed that they might not have been.

At 1:17 p.m. (Note: An alternate account reported by The Sedalia Weekly Bazoo reported that Richards was led to the gallows at 12:48 p.m. This report would also list the song as "There Is a Fountain Filled with Blood", and the time of his hanging as 1:10 p.m.) on April 26, 1879, Richards was hanged. The St. Louis Globe-Democrat said it took fifteen minutes for him to die. (Note: Other accounts gave the amount of time as being five to ten minutes.) Richards was the first person in Nebraska's history to be executed, since its incorporation into the United States in 1867. Shortly after his execution, a photographer was able to capture a photograph of Richards' corpse propped inside a coffin.

=== Aftermath ===
Local doctors hounded Richards before his execution, requesting him to donate his body for medical purposes. He refused, and was buried in Minden. Despite his gravesite being guarded, his corpse was stolen the night after his execution—The Sedalia Weekly Bazoo suspected the doctors who had wanted to examine him—but was returned to its resting place shortly thereafter. Sometime later, his body was dug up once again; this time, Richards' bones were scattered on the streets of Kearney. On November 1, 1882, it was reported that Kearney County Gazette had obtained Richards' skull and placed it on display in the newspaper's office window. This was the last reported mention of Richards' skull. Its present location and status is unknown.

== Pathology ==
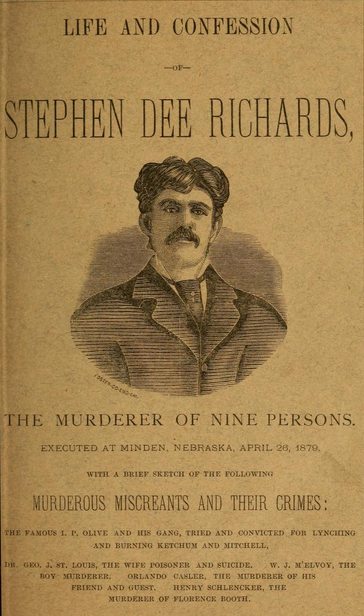
Cover page to the book Life and Confession of Stephen Dee Richards: The Murderer of Nine Persons (1879)

After his arrest, many people described Richards as charismatic, commenting that he successfully concealed his dark nature under a polite, articulate, and handsome exterior. (Note: Attributed to multiple references:) A friend who accompanied Richards' autobiographer to his interviews said during one visit that Richards did not have the look of a murderer. Contemporary observers remarked that Richards seemed to feel no guilt whatsoever about his crimes. Numerous times between his arrest and his execution, Richards was asked why he had no empathy towards his victims or remorse for his crimes. Sometimes he simply refused to answer. When he did choose to reply to this question, he gave conflicting responses. He usually cited his associations with people of questionable morals and his time working at the Mount Pleasant Asylum as deleterious influences. When The Nebraska State Journal questioned him about his lack of remorse for the heinous murders he had committed, particularly those of the Harlson family, Richards recounted an event from his childhood. He had been tasked to kill a litter of kittens and did so by bashing each of their heads against a tree. After he had killed all the kittens, he found that he felt no guilt about it, and found the killing "fun". Although some outlets, including modern-day author Michael Newton classified Richards as a "thrill killer", in interviews with the press Richards adamantly denied that he enjoyed inflicting pain upon others, claiming that in his younger years, other people had considered him to be kind. Reporters who interviewed him after his arrest were often struck by his calm and collected behavior; an article in the New York Daily Herald described him as being "carefree and cheerful". In an interview for the Wheeling Daily Intelligencer, Richards said he knew he would be executed for his crimes, but that he was unafraid of death and was "ready to meet it". When the jury sentenced him to death, he was said to have been unconcerned and in good spirits. The St. Louis Globe-Democrat (which doubted that he had committed nine murders) reported that Richards broke down during his final moments, but this was contradicted by other newspaper accounts of his execution.

I have killed nine persons, and I can't say I feel any worse for it.

— Stephen D. Richards

Criminal psychology and profiling was not used as an investigative technique until the Jack the Ripper murders in 1888, nine years after Richards' execution, in 2018, forensic psychologist Katherine Ramsland referred to Richards as "The Old West’s Ted Bundy". Both Richards and Bundy used their charisma to manipulate others, and both displayed a complete lack of remorse for their crimes. Ramsland also wrote on the differences between the two men, noting that Bundy murdered for sexual gratification, whereas Richards had no preferred method of killing or type of victim; furthermore, Bundy fought his execution, while Richards was indifferent to his death sentence. She further described a possible reason for his violent behavior, citing a severe head injury that he received shortly before the killings started. Richards himself briefly mentioned this injury to the Sedalia Weekly Bazoo, claiming that he received the injury while traveling with several companions in the spring of 1877. When pressed about the circumstances that led to the injury, Richards refused to elaborate on the incident.

Richards used various aliases during his travels. In an account of his life published in The Sedalia Weekly Bazoo, Richards admitted to having used the false names George Gallagher, F.A. Hoge, and William Hudson. Richards also admitted to corresponding with various acquaintances under the names D.J. Roberts, J. Littleton, and W. A. Littleton.

== Legacy ==
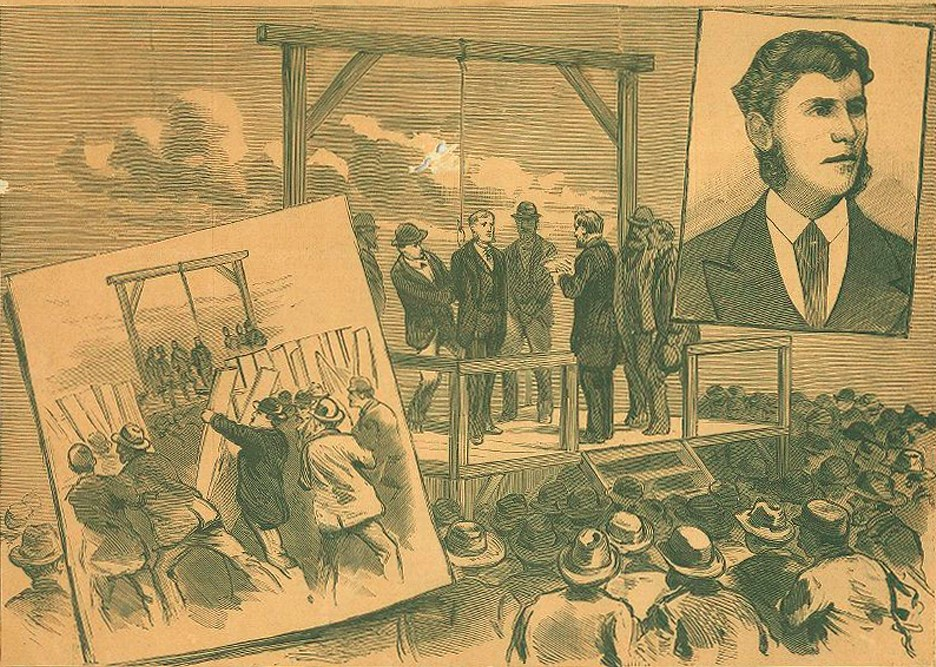
An illustration depicting the execution of Richards published a month after his execution in the National Police Gazette.

At the time of Richards' arrest and execution, it was a popular belief that all criminals were of poor quality and limited education. The horrific nature of his crimes gave Richards some notoriety which increased after his capture due in part to his not fitting with the public's preconception of criminals, with reporters and members of the public often struck by his charisma, good looks, his education, and outspokenness. Richards was featured in a handful of books and periodicals, the first of these was The Philosophy of Insanity: Richard, the Nebraska Fiend by Dr. John Sanderson Christianson, published on February 9, 1879. A Nebraska State Journal interview with Richards before his execution was published in a trail pamphlet titled Life and Confession of Stephen Dee Richards, the Murderer of Nine Persons Executed at Minden, Nebraska, April 26, 1879. The pamphlet, published on May 1, 1879, five days after Richards' hanging, includes entries on other contemporary criminal cases. After his execution, interest in Richards dwindled and he subsequently faded from public memory.

In modern times, Richards is now acknowledged as Nebraska's first documented serial killer. NET Nebraska's documentary Until He Is Dead: A History Of Nebraska's Death Penalty, featured Richards as a prime example of the public spectacle of the state's early executions; the documentary mistakenly mentioned him under his "Samuel Richards" alias. An episode of the SyFy Channel documentary series Paranormal Witness, titled "The Nebraska Fiend", features a family who is purportedly being tormented by Richards' spirit, with an unnamed actor portraying Richards. Richards was featured in the 2021 novel The Scarlet Pen written by Jennifer Uhlarik, as a part of the historical crime series True Colors. The novel is a fictionalized version of Richards' interaction with his fiancée, to whom he regularly sent letters.

== See also ==
List of people executed in Nebraska (pre-1972)

== Sources ==
=== Books ===
- Life and Confession of Stephen Dee Richards: The Murderer of Nine Persons, Executed at Minden, Nebraska, April 26, 1879 (1st ed.). State Journal Co. May 1, 1879 – via Internet Archive.
- Anon. (1911). Bulletin of the New York Public Library. Vol. 15 – via Google Books.
- Nebraska Senate Legislature (1879). Senate Journal of the Legislature of the State of Nebraska: Fifteenth Regular Session. Vol. 15. Journal Company, State Printers – via Google Books.
- Bang, Roy (1952). Heroes Without Medals: A Pioneer History of Kearney County, Nebraska (1st ed.). Warp Publishing Company – via Google Books.
- Bell, Clark (1885). The Medico-Legal Journal. Vol. 49. Medico-Legal Society – via Google Books.
- Boyle, Alan (August 1, 1999). Holding Stone Hands: On the Trail of the Cheyenne Exodus. University of Nebraska Press. ISBN 978-0-8032-1294-7. Archived from the original on March 5, 2022 – via Google Books.
- Gless, Alan (2008). The History of Nebraska Law. Ohio University Press. pp. 21–25, 30. ISBN 978-0-8214-1787-4. Archived from the original on May 18, 2023.
- Holt, Michael (1978). The Political Crisis of the 1850s. Wiley. pp. 53–54, 72–73. ISBN 978-0-4714-0840-6. Archived from the original on May 18, 2023 – via Google Books.
- Jenkins, Philip (December 2004). Moral Panic: Changing Concepts of the Child Molester in Modern America. Yale University Press. ISBN 978-0-300-10963-4 – via Google Books.
- Johnson, Rolf (August 1, 2000). Happy as a Big Sunflower: Adventures in the West, 1876-1880. Bison Books. ISBN 978-0-803-27614-7. Archived from the original on September 29, 2023 – via Google Books.
- Kuhlman, Augustus (1929). A Guide to Material on Crime and Criminal Justice. H. W. Wilson Company. Archived from the original on July 16, 2023.
- Lewis, John, ed. (1942). Messages and Proclamations of the Governors of Nebraska, 1854–1941. Vol. 1. Nebraska State Historical Society – via Google Books.
- McDade, Thomas (1961). The Annals of Murder: A Bibliography of Books and Pamphlets on American murders from Colonial Times to 1900. University of Oklahoma Press – via Google Books.
- Teeters, Negley; Hedblom, Jack (June 1, 1967). "... Hang by the neck ...": the legal use of scaffold and noose, gibbet, stake, and firing squad from colonial times to the present. C. C. Thomas. ISBN 978-0-398-01906-8 – via Google Books.
- Newton, Michael (February 2006). The Encyclopedia of Serial Killers (2nd ed.). Infobase Publishing. ISBN 978-0-8160-6987-3 – via Google Books.
- Olson, James; Naugle, Ronald; Montag, John (January 30, 2015). History of Nebraska (4th ed.). University of Nebraska Press. ISBN 978-0-8032-8626-9. Archived from the original on March 26, 2022.
- Ramsland, Katherine (2006). Inside the Minds of Serial Killers: Why They Kill. Greenwood Publishing Group. ISBN 978-0-275-99099-2 – via Google Books.
- Stiles, Anne (December 22, 2011). Popular Fiction and Brain Science in the Late Nineteenth Century (E-book). Cambridge University Press. ISBN 978-1-1395-0490-4 – via Google Books.
- Wilson, R. (January 10, 2014). Legal Executions in Nebraska, Kansas and Oklahoma Including the Indian Territory: A Comprehensive Registry. McFarland & Company. ISBN 978-1-107-01001-7 – via Google Books.

=== Newspapers ===
- "A Chapter of Murders". New York Daily Herald. New York, New York. December 14, 1878. p. 7. Archived from the original on October 15, 2019 – via Newspapers.com (subscription required).
- "The Journal". The Columbus Journal. Columbus, Nebraska. December 18, 1878. p. 2. Archived from the original on April 11, 2020 – via Newspapers.com (subscription required).
- "A Vile Murderer: A Prisoner Confesses to Having Murdered Nine Persons Over Three Years". The New York Daily Herald. New York, New York. December 25, 1878. p. 5. Archived from the original on October 30, 2019 – via Newspapers.com (subscription required).
- "The Steubenville Murderer Turns Out to be of Wheeling Origin". The Wheeling Daily Intelligencer. Wheeling, West Virginia. December 25, 1878. p. 2. Archived from the original on April 17, 2022 – via Newspapers.com (subscription required).
- "Friday, December 27, 1878". Nebraska State Journal. Lincoln, Nebraska. December 27, 1878. p. 2. Archived from the original on April 6, 2020 – via Newspapers.com (subscription required).
- "Richards, the Murderer". Quad-City Times. Davenport, Iowa. December 28, 1878. p. 1 – via Newspapers.com (subscription required).
- "A Hardened Criminal". The Atchison Daily Champion. Atchison, Kansas. December 29, 1878. p. 2. Archived from the original on April 6, 2020 – via Newspapers.com (subscription required).
- "Richards Back in Nebraska". The Cincinnati Daily Star. Cincinnati, Ohio. December 30, 1878. p. 1. Archived from the original on April 3, 2023 – via Newspapers.com (subscription required).
- "Richards, the Kearney County Murderer, Gives for the First Time Full Details of His Crimes". The Omaha Herald. Omaha, Nebraska. December 31, 1878 – via Newspapers.com (subscription required).
- "Nebraska's Boss Murderer: Richards on His Way to Kearney Junction, Where He Will End His Career". Press and Daily Dakotaian. Yankton, South Dakota. December 31, 1878. p. 5. Archived from the original on April 17, 2022 – via Newspapers.com (subscription required).
- "Richards, The Mount Pleasant Criminal". Belmont Chronicle. Saint Clairsville, Ohio. January 2, 1879. p. 2. Archived from the original on April 6, 2020 – via Newspapers.com (subscription required).
- "The Nebraska Murderer: A Cool Confession of His Many Crimes". The New York Times. New York, New York. January 2, 1879. p. 2. Archived from the original on April 3, 2023 – via Newspapers.com (subscription required).
- "Rande's Rival". The Workingman's Friend. Leavenworth, Kansas. January 3, 1879. p. 1. Archived from the original on April 7, 2020 – via Newspapers.com (subscription required).
- "He Killed Children as He Would Rabbits". New York Daily Herald. New York, New York. January 7, 1879. p. 7. Archived from the original on October 15, 2019 – via Newspapers.com (subscription required).
- "A Daring Demon". Little Falls Transcript. Little Falls, Minnesota. January 9, 1879. p. 2. Archived from the original on October 17, 2020 – via Newspapers.com (subscription required).
- "The Nebraska Fiend". Sioux City Journal. Sioux City, Iowa. January 17, 1879. p. 2. Archived from the original on April 3, 2023 – via Newspapers.com (subscription required).
- "State News and Notes". The Nebraska Advertiser. Brownville, Nebraska. January 23, 1879. p. 2 – via Newspapers.com (subscription required).
- "The City". Nebraska State Journal. Lincoln, Nebraska. April 26, 1879. p. 4. Archived from the original on April 6, 2020 – via Newspapers.com (subscription required).
- "The Craven Choked". St. Louis Globe-Democrat. St. Louis, Missouri. April 27, 1879. p. 4. Archived from the original on April 3, 2023 – via Newspapers.com (subscription required).
- "Scenes at a Hanging". The New York Times. New York, New York. April 27, 1879. p. 2. Archived from the original on April 3, 2023 – via Newspapers.com (subscription required).
- "Crimes and Casualties: Execution of Richards". The Saint Paul Globe. Saint Paul, Minnesota. April 27, 1879. p. 7. Archived from the original on April 3, 2023 – via Newspapers.com (subscription required).
- T.B. Murdock (April 27, 1879). "Stephen D. Richards". Walnut Valley Times. El Dorado, Kansas. p. 2. Archived from the original on April 17, 2022 – via Newspapers.com (subscription required).
- "The Advertiser". The Nebraska Advertiser. Brownville, Nebraska. May 1, 1879b. p. 2. Archived from the original on April 3, 2023 – via Newspapers.com (subscription required).
- "Dead and Damned: Stephen D. Richards Hanged". The Sedalia Weekly Bazoo. Sedalia, Missouri. May 6, 1879. pp. 2–3. Archived from the original on April 3, 2023 – via Newspapers.com (subscription required).
