= Upper Oak Creek Descent Ruts of the Woodbury Cutoff, Ox Bow Trail of the California Road =

- Creating Upper Oak Creek Descent Ruts of the Woodbury Cutoff, Ox Bow Trail of the California Road
- U.S. National Register of Historic Places
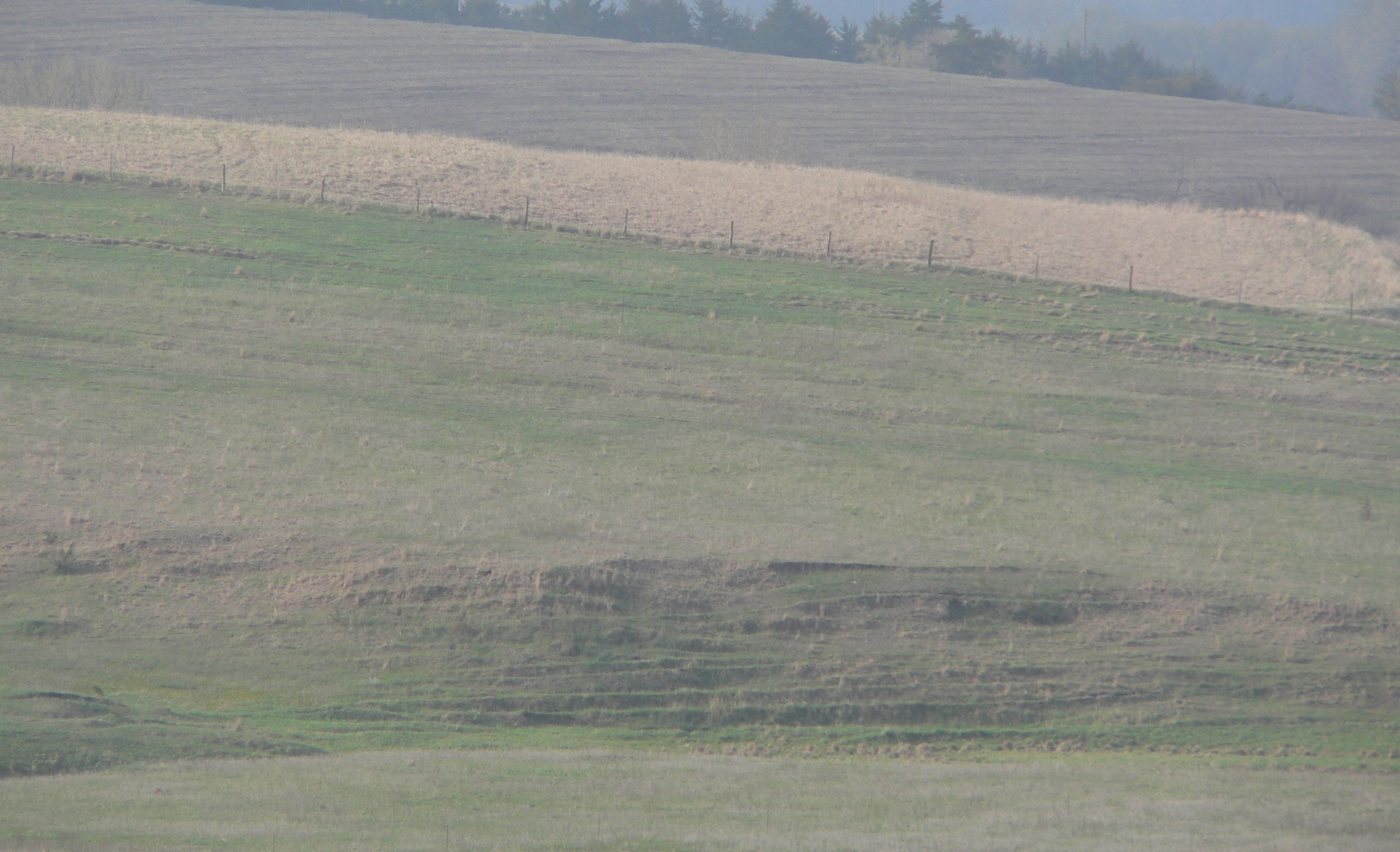
- The descent ruts can be seen as parallel striations in the ground, roughly parallel to the fence and lying between the fence in the background and the deeply-eroded swale in the foreground.

- Location within Nebraska Location within the United States
- Location: Rural southeastern Butler County, Nebraska
- Coordinates: 41°7′59.39″N 96°58′28.31″W
- Built: 1847
- Architect: Daniel Phineas Woodbury
- NRHP reference No.: 92001572
- Added to NRHP: November 27, 1992

The Upper Oak Creek Descent Ruts of the Woodbury Cutoff, Ox Bow Trail of the California Road are remnants of the Ox Bow Trail located in southeastern Butler County, Nebraska, United States. They are one of the few trail remnants left of the Ox Bow Trail, which originated at Nebraska City, Nebraska and connected to the Oregon Trail and the Mormon Trail. In 1992, they were listed in the National Register of Historic Places.

== Background ==
During the early 1840s, early American pioneers began migrating west to places such in Oregon, California, and Utah, which would later become states of the United States. They followed the Oregon and Mormon trails, which followed on either side of the Platte River in what is now modern day Nebraska. The Oregon Trail ran along the south side of the Platte and the Mormon Trail ran along the North side.

Both the Oregon and Mormon trails had multiple starting points along the Missouri River. The major starting points included Independence, St. Joseph, Nebraska City, and Council Bluffs-Omaha. From each of these locations (and others) there were multiple routes to the main Oregon and Mormon trails.

As American pioneers increasingly began moving west in the 1840s, the US army began searching for sites to build forts for protection of the pioneers. Lt. Daniel Phineas Woodbury was charged with finding new locations for forts along the Platte river. He found and supervised the building of Fort Kearney and he established one of several alternate trails from Nebraska City to Fort Kearney. The route that he discovered in 1847 would come to be known as the Woodbury cutoff or Woodbury trail. The Upper Oak Creek Descent Ruts are along the Woodbury Trail in Butler county, Nebraska.

== Description ==
The ruts were created from 1847 to 1860 by the wagon wheels of the wagons pioneers used to move westward. The segment of preserved ruts is approximately .25 miles (0.40 km) in length running through unploughed prairie. This segment of ruts is one of the few remaining remnants of the Woodbuy Cutoff due to extensive agriculture in eastern Nebraska where the trail once ran. The ruts are approximately 20 feet (6.1 m) wide at their eastern edge and run southwest along a ridge for about .125 miles (0.201 km) at which point the trail curves to the west. As the trail turns west, it descends 110 feet (34 m) to Oak Creek. As of 1992, the total length of the remaining wagon wheel ruts was 2,315 feet (706 m).
