= 1st Nebraska Veteran Cavalry Battalion =

- Active: January to August, 1864 to July 10, 1865
- Country: United States
- Allegiance: Union
- Branch: Cavalry

The 1st Nebraska Veteran Cavalry Battalion was a cavalry battalion that served in the Union Army during the American Civil War.

== Service ==
When the nine-month 2nd Nebraska Cavalry Regiment was mustered out of service in the fall of 1863, Governor Alvin Saunders authorized the raising of an independent battalion of cavalry from the ranks of the 2nd Nebraska Cavalry to serve for the balance of the war. The battalion was organized in four companies at Omaha, Nebraska between January and August, 1864 by Major George Anderson.

It was then attached to the District of Nebraska and operated against Indians in Nebraska and Colorado and guarded the Overland Mail routes. After the end of the Civil War the battalion was consolidated with the 1st Nebraska Cavalry Regiment on July 10, 1865.

== Detailed service ==
Duty at Fort Cottonwood, Nebraska Territory, October and November, 1864. Duty at Gillman's Station until January, 1865. Duty at Cottonwood Springs until February, 1865, and at Gillman's Station until July, 1865. Company "B" at Dakota City until July, 1865. Scout from Dakota City April 12–16, 1865. Scout to Middle Bow River April 22–27. Company "C" had duty at Fort Cottonwood, until July, 1865. Scout from Cottonwood May 12–14, 1865. Company "D" had duty at Omaha until February, 1865. Moved to Fort Kearney February 25 and duty until April, and at Fort Laramie until July.

== Commanders ==
- Major George Anderson

=== See also ===
- List of Nebraska Civil War units
