= Garden Key Light =

Lighthouse in Florida, US

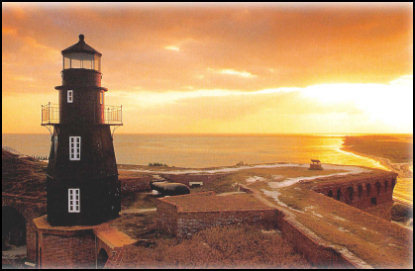
- Garden Key Light at sunset
- Location: Fort Jefferson, Dry Tortugas
- Coordinates: 24°37′41″N 82°52′20″W

Tower
- Foundation: a stairwell in Fort Jefferson
- Construction: boilerplate iron
- Automated: 1912
- Height: 70 feet (21 m)
- Shape: hexagonal

Light
- First lit: 1826
- Deactivated: 1924
- Lens: 1st order Fresnel lens

The Garden Key Light, also known as the Tortuga Harbor Light, is located at Fort Jefferson, on Garden Key in the Dry Tortugas, Florida. The first lighthouse, started in 1824 and first lit in 1826, was a brick conical tower. The lighthouse and its outbuildings were the only structures on Garden Key until construction started on Fort Jefferson in 1846. Construction continued until 1861, but the fort was never completed.

In 1858 the Dry Tortugas lighthouse was built on a nearby island, and the first-order Fresnel lens was moved there from the Garden Key lighthouse. The Garden Key lighthouse received a fourth-order Fresnel lens and became the harbor light for Fort Jefferson. In 1877 the brick tower was razed and replaced with a boilerplate iron tower on top of a stairwell in the fort. In 1912, the keeper's house burned down, and the lighthouse was automated with tanks of compressed acetylene replacing the butts of kerosene to fuel the lights. The light was deactivated in 1924.

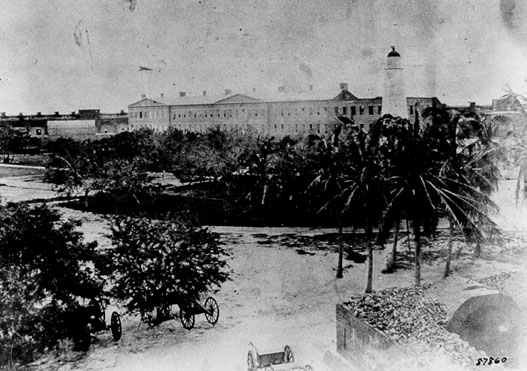
The old brick tower standing beside Fort Jefferson before the tower was torn down in 1877.

USS Maine was part of the squadron stationed at Garden Key when it exploded and sank in the harbor of Havana, Cuba. James Fenimore Cooper's 1848 novel Jack Tier: or the Florida Reefs, is set at the Garden Key lighthouse. Ernest Hemingway's 1932 short story "After the Storm" is about a shipwreck between Garden Key and Rebecca Shoal, to the east of Garden Key.

== See also ==
- Jack Tier
