= Dry Tortugas Light =

Lighthouse in Florida, United States

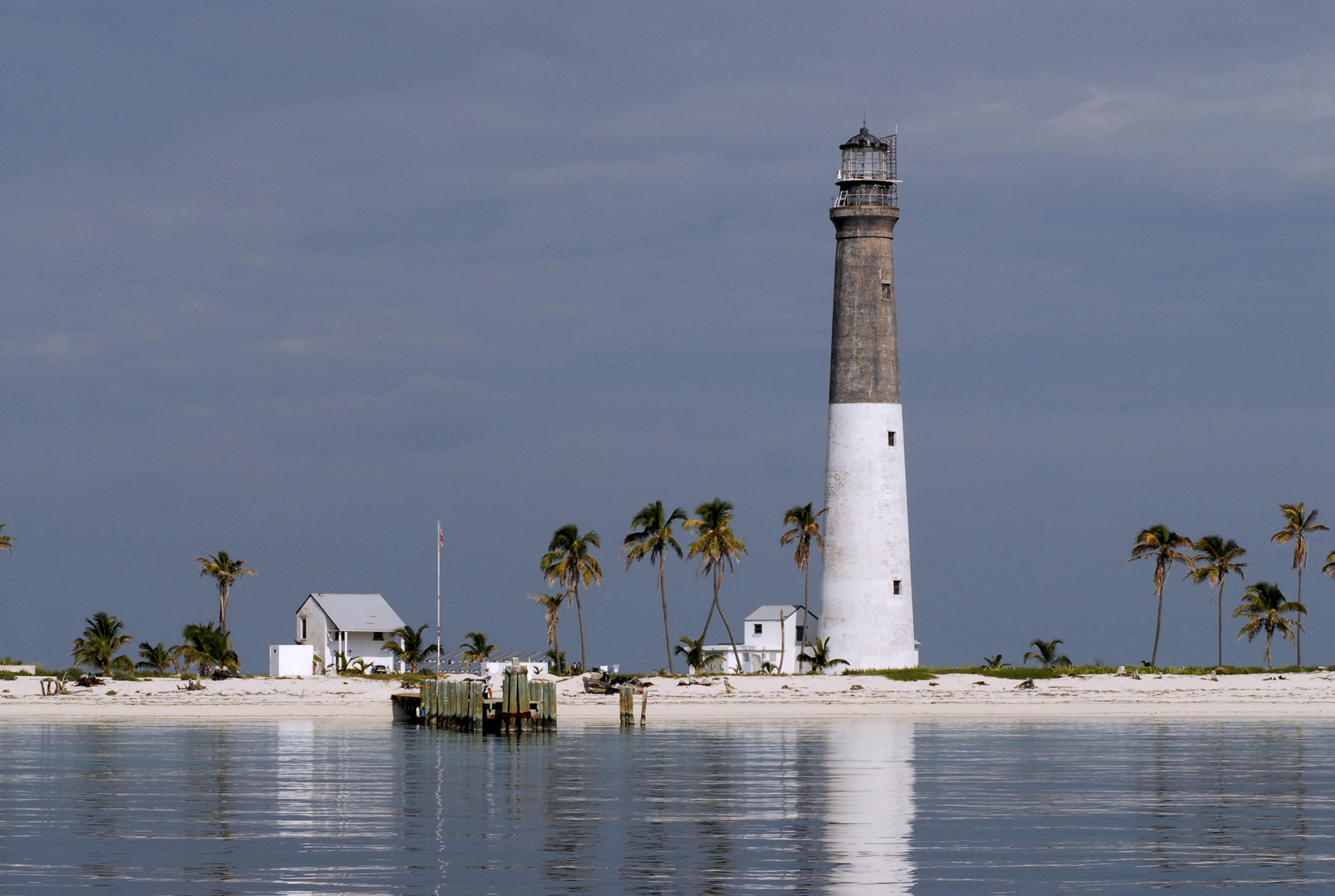
- The Dry Tortugas Light is on Loggerhead Key
- Location: Loggerhead Key; Dry Tortugas; Florida; United States
- Coordinates: 24°38′0.1″N 82°55′14.0″W

Tower
- Constructed: 1858
- Foundation: stone basement
- Construction: brick tower
- Automated: 1988
- Height: 157 feet (48 m)
- Shape: tapered cylindrical tower with balcony and lantern
- Markings: white lower half tower, natural gray upper half tower, black lantern
- Power source: solar power
- Racon: "K" (−∘−)

Light
- Focal height: 151 feet (46 m)
- Lens: 1st Fresnel lens (original); 2nd order (later); VRB-25 aerobeacon (current)
- Range: 20 nautical miles (37 km; 23 mi)
- Characteristic: Fl W 20s.

The Dry Tortugas Light is a lighthouse located on Loggerhead Key, three miles west of Fort Jefferson, Florida. It has also been called the Loggerhead Lighthouse. It was taken out of operation in 2015, and has been described as being farther from the mainland than any other light in the world."

== History ==
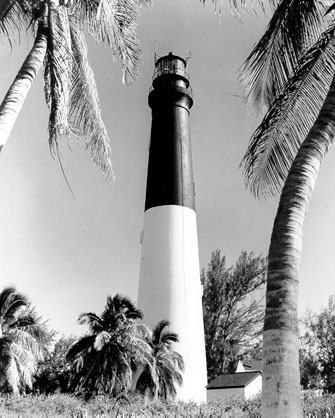
Undated image of the lighthouse with black and white exterior paint

In 1856, Capt. Daniel Phineas Woodbury supervised construction of the lighthouse, based on an 1855 design by Capt. Horatio Wright, and it became operational in 1858.

When originally constructed the walls of the tower were left its natural, yellowish-red brick color. The lens was a first order Fresnel lens which was manufactured by the French firm of L. Sautter and Company. In addition to the tower, the light station included a brick two-story dwelling with Greek Revival features, a brick two-story kitchen (still standing), and oil house, wash house, outhouses and cisterns.

Forty-one year old Benjamin H. Kerr was appointed head keeper in 1858 and received a salary of $600 per year ($22,327 in 2025). He had previously been keeper at Garden Key since 1850. Charles H. Perry was appointed 1st assistant keeper and John Fritz as the 2nd Assistant keeper. Both assistants received $300 per year ($11,163 in 2025).

The Loggerhead Key lighthouse has a stone foundation and a conical brick tower. The walls are 6 feet (1.8 m) thick at the base and taper to 4 feet (1.2 m) thick at the top. The tower was later painted black on the upper part and white below. A radio room is attached to the base of the tower. A later replacement lens, a second order clamshell revolving Fresnel lens, is now on display at the United States Coast Guard Aids to Navigation School in Yorktown, Virginia. The light was automated in 1988.

The first lighthouse in the Dry Tortugas was on Garden Key, and became operational in 1826. After several proposals for a new lighthouse on the "outer shoals" of the Dry Tortugas, a new lighthouse was built on Loggerhead Key and completed in 1858 at a cost of US$35,000 ($1.3 million in 2025), which was the amount that had been projected to upgrade the existing lighthouse on Garden Key.

The Dry Tortugas lighthouse, along with the Garden Key lighthouse at Fort Jefferson, were the only lights on the Gulf coast that stayed in full operation throughout the American Civil War. A civilian prisoner of Fort Jefferson, John W. Adare and a companion, used planks to swim to the Key and stole the keeper's boat. Although they made it to Havana, the Spanish authorities there extradited them back to Key West. Undeterred, Adare attempted a second escape, one in which he needed a second plank for his ankle ball and chain. This time the boat was locked and Adare was captured the next day.

The tower was damaged by a hurricane in October 1873 and plans were drawn up for a new tower. The tower was repaired by rebuilding the top 9 feet (2.7 m) and extending the steel rods anchoring the lantern to the bottom of the tower. After the repaired tower survived another hurricane in September 1875, the plans for a new tower were deferred and eventually dropped.

The Dry Tortugas Light received an electric lamp in 1931, becoming the most powerful lighthouse in America, with three million candela. The rotating beacon stopped working in April 2014, and was formally decommissioned in December 2015.

== Head keepers ==
- Benjamin H. Kerr (1858 – 1861)
- James P. Lightburn (1861 – 1862)
- Robert H. Thompson (1862 – 1872)
- William B. Taylor (1872)
- Thomas Moore (1872 – 1881)
- Robert H. Thompson (1881 – 1888)
- Charles A. Roberts (1888)
- George R. Billberry (1888 – 1907)
- Edgar J. Russell (1907 – at least 1915)
- Charles Johnson (at least 1917 – at least 1921)
- Andrew M. Albury (1928 – at least 1947)

In later years, before the light was automated, the lighthouse was manned by Coast Guardsmen who rotated on and off the island every few days.

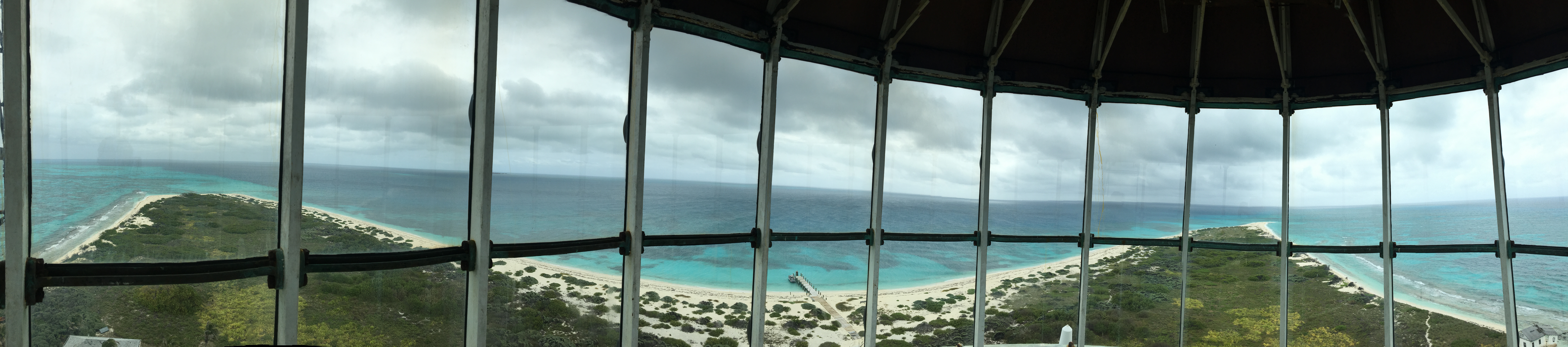
Panoramic view from the lantern level of the Dry Tortugas Light.

== See also ==
- List of lighthouses in Florida
- List of lighthouses in the United States
