= Loggerhead Key =

Island in the Dry Tortugas group

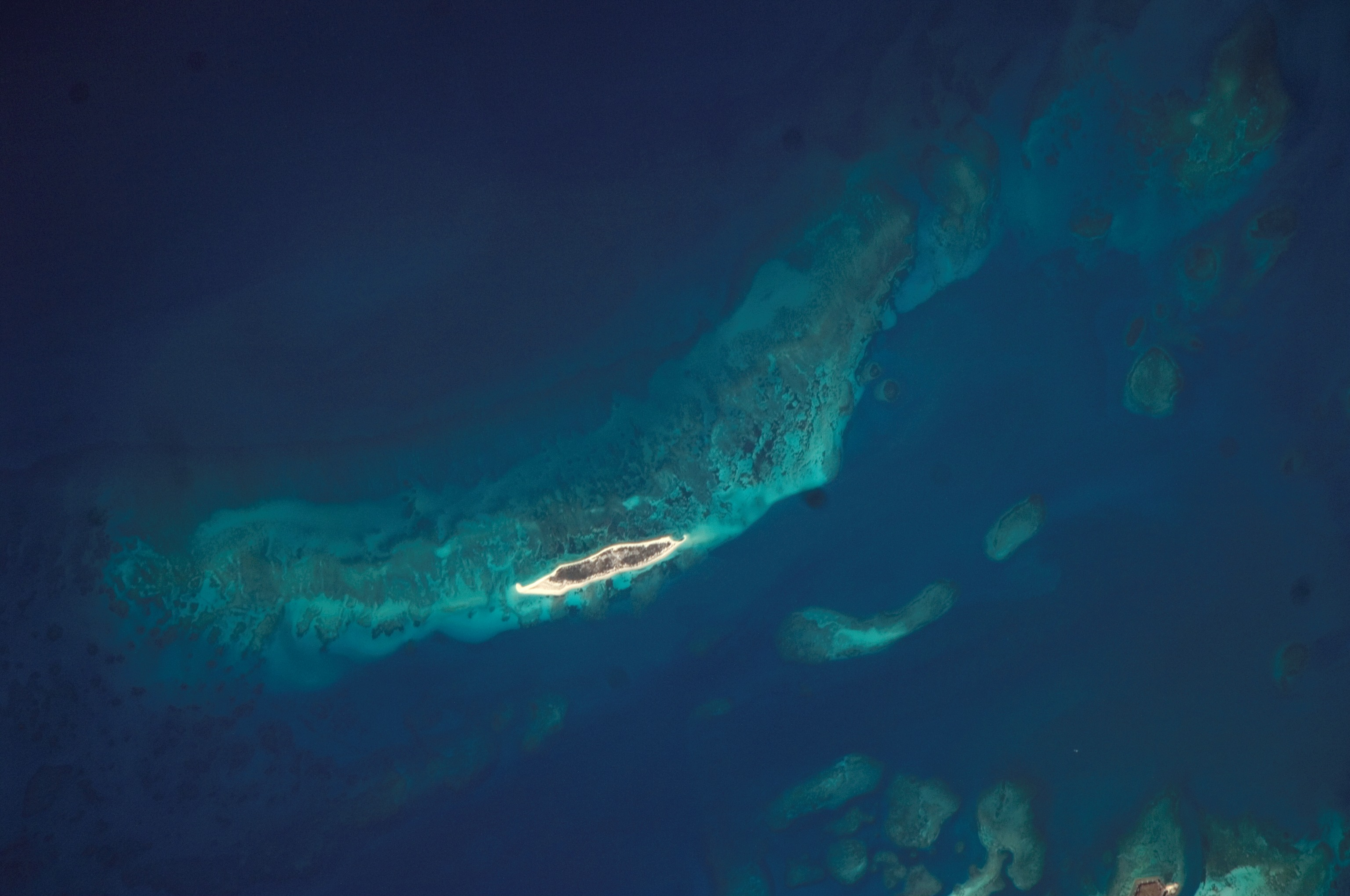
- An aerial view of Loggerhead Key, Dry Tortugas

- Location within Florida Location within the Caribbean

Geography
- Location: Dry Tortugas at the end of Florida Keys, United States
- Coordinates: 24°37′57″N 82°55′14″W
- Archipelago: Florida Keys
- Adjacent to: Gulf of Mexico
- Total islands: 7
- Major islands: Garden Key
- Area: 49 acres (20 ha)
- Highest elevation: 10 ft (3 m)

Administration
- United States
- State: Florida
- County: Monroe County
- Census County Division: Lower Keys

Demographics
- Population: Regular: 0; Seasonal: varies (as of October 2016)

Additional information
- Time zone: EST (UTC-5:00)
  - Summer (DST): EDT (UTC-4:00)

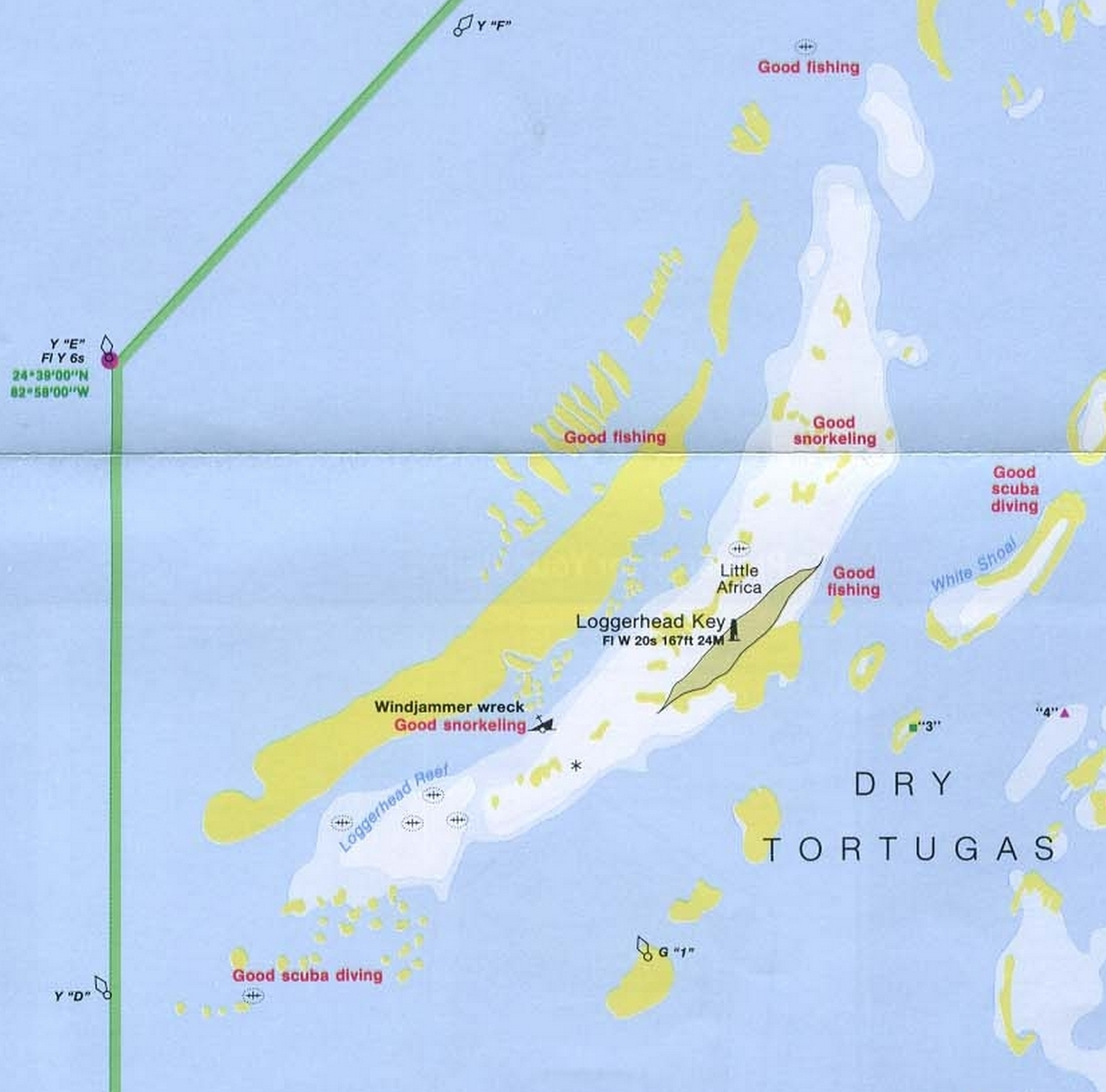
A basic map of Loggerhead Key

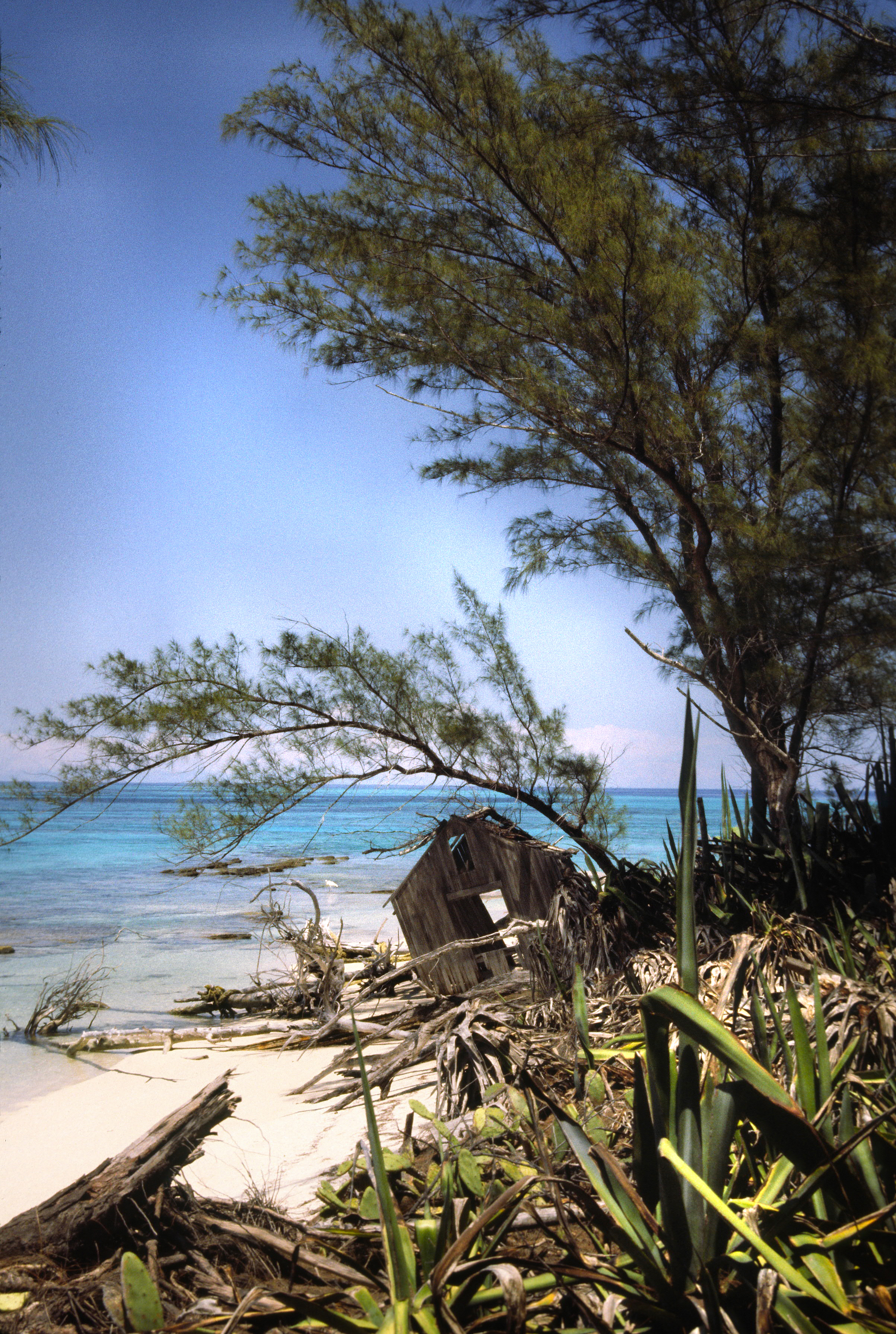
An abandoned building on Loggerhead Key

Loggerhead Key is an uninhabited tropical island within the Dry Tortugas group of islands in the Gulf of Mexico. At approximately 49 acres (19.8 hectares) in size, it is the largest island of the Dry Tortugas. Despite being uninhabited, the island receives visitors, such as day visitors and campers. The island only has a few built structures, including the Dry Tortugas Light and a lightkeeper's house that was constructed in the 1920s. The island has drinking water derived using desalination technology and solar power. The drinking water is not available for the public and used exclusively by researchers who temporarily reside on the island for short periods of time. The Carnegie Marine Biological Laboratory operated on Loggerhead Key from 1904 to 1939.

== Climate ==
Loggerhead Key has a tropical savannah climate (Köppen Aw). Summers are long, hot and year round. The rainy season lasts from June to October with light rainfall when compared to the rest of Florida. Loggerhead Key is likely the driest place in Florida with the lowest amount of precipitation inches and precipitation days, being far from the Florida mainland where afternoon thunderstorms form with ease over the land.

Climate data for Loggerhead Key
Month	Jan	Feb	Mar	Apr	May	Jun	Jul	Aug	Sep	Oct	Nov	Dec	Year
Mean daily maximum °F (°C)	74 (23)	76 (24)	78 (26)	83 (28)	86 (30)	90 (32)	91 (33)	92 (33)	90 (32)	85 (29)	79 (26)	76 (24)	83 (28)
Daily mean °F (°C)	69.5 (20.8)	70.5 (21.4)	72.5 (22.5)	77 (25)	80 (27)	83.5 (28.6)	84.5 (29.2)	85.5 (29.7)	83.5 (28.6)	80 (27)	74.5 (23.6)	71.5 (21.9)	77.7 (25.4)
Mean daily minimum °F (°C)	65 (18)	65 (18)	67 (19)	71 (22)	74 (23)	77 (25)	78 (26)	79 (26)	77 (25)	75 (24)	70 (21)	67 (19)	72 (22)
Average precipitation inches (mm)	2.7 (69)	1.8 (46)	2 (51)	1.9 (48)	1.9 (48)	3.3 (84)	2.8 (71)	3.7 (94)	6 (150)	4.6 (120)	1.9 (48)	2.1 (53)	34.7 (882)
Average precipitation days	5	3	3	2	4	6	6	8	9	7	3	4	60

== Etymology ==
Loggerhead Key is named after the loggerhead sea turtle, an endangered marine reptile and species of sea turtle with a cosmopolitan distribution throughout the world.

== Coral reefs ==
The Little Africa coral reef is located at Loggerhead Key. The reef is home to various species of tropical fish, spiny lobster and several juvenile game fish. Coral types include "various species of stony and gorgonian coral".

== Flora and fauna ==
The flora of Loggerhead Key includes mangrove, coconut palms, geiger trees, morning glory, sea lavender and cactus. In the 1840s, the island was covered with white buttonwood trees, which were burned or cut down by island inhabitants. Bay cedar existed on the island in the early 1900s.

Fauna of Loggerhead Key includes sea turtles, which are monitored by park rangers with the Dry Tortugas National Park to document nesting and hatching rates. The loggerhead sea turtle is also present on the island. In August 2016, a National Park marine biologist stated that 113 loggerhead turtle nests existed on the island at that time. This was the highest recorded nest rate compared previous years.

The island also has brown pelicans.

=== Former rhesus macaque habitat ===
In 1972, hundreds of rhesus macaque monkeys were brought from India to Loggerhead Key by Charles River Laboratories. This was done to provide the monkeys a place to breed, to supply the animals for medical research laboratory experiments. Around 1,322 of the monkeys existed on the island between 1987 and 1990.

== Dry Tortugas Light ==
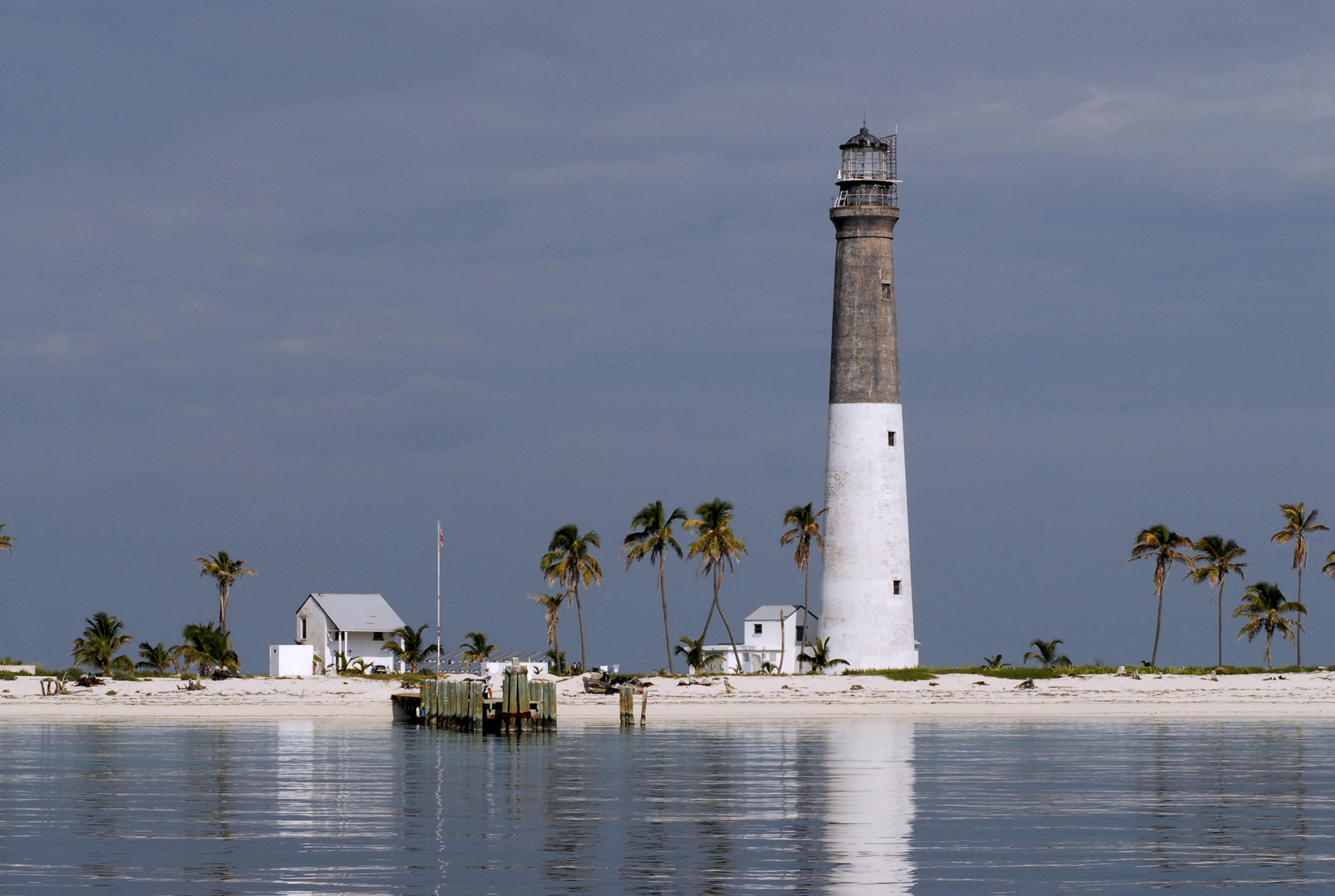
The Dry Tortugas Light on Loggerhead Key, with two surrounding buildings

The Dry Tortugas Light is a lighthouse located on Loggerhead Key. It began operations in 1858 and was decommissioned in 2014.

== Carnegie Marine Biological Laboratory ==
The Carnegie Marine Biological Laboratory, also referred to as the Tortugas Laboratory, was a marine biology laboratory and research facility constructed on the northern end of Loggerhead Key that operated from 1904 to 1939. It was constructed and operated by the Carnegie Institution of Washington. The Carnegie Marine Biological Laboratory performed some of the first research on Western hemisphere mangroves and coral reefs, marine life at the Loggerhead Key coral reefs, other marine life, and also performed underwater color and black-and-white photography there. Due to safety concerns regarding the hurricane season, research only occurred in the late spring and summer months.
