= Jack Tier =

Novel by James Fenimore Cooper

Jack Tier, or the Florida Reef is a novel by James Fenimore Cooper first published in 1848 by New York publisher Burgess, Stringer & Co. Set during the Mexican–American War, the novel relates a twenty-year homosocial relationship verging on the homoerotic between a sailor and the captain of the boat. But by the end of the novel the sailor is the captain's wife, transforming the story into one of heterosexual love and passion.

The novel was first published serially in a magazine under the title Rose Budd in 1846. When commenting on the novel in the context of other novels about the Mexican-American War, critic Jaime Javier Rodríguez describes the novel as "an obscure work not always found in library stacks [thus it] remains largely unread but it too deserves attention."

Garden Key Light on Garden Key in the Dry Tortugas was used as the setting for the novel.
