= List of Nebraska units in the American Civil War =

The following is a list of Nebraska Territory units formed during the American Civil War. Some saw action only on the frontier in the Indian Wars. The state raised one regiment of infantry (subsequently converted to cavalry), two regiments (including the converted infantry) and a battalion of cavalry (successor of the second cavalry regiment), several companies of militia, and two scout companies.

== Infantry ==
- 1st Nebraska Infantry Regiment
- 1st Nebraska Militia

== Cavalry ==
- 1st Nebraska Cavalry Regiment
- 1st Nebraska Veteran Cavalry Battalion
- 2nd Nebraska Cavalry Regiment
- Independent Company "A" Pawnee Scouts, Nebraska Cavalry
- Independent Company Omaha Scouts, Nebraska Cavalry
- Stuff'ts Independent Company of Indian Scouts, Nebraska Cavalry

== See also ==
- Lists of American Civil War regiments by state
- Nebraska in the American Civil War
