= 1st Nebraska Infantry Regiment =

1st Nebraska Infantry Regiment may refer to:

- 1st Nebraska Infantry Regiment (1861), in the Union Army during the American Civil War
- 1st Nebraska Infantry Regiment (1898), in the US Army during the Spanish–American and Philippine–American wars
