= Nebraska Territory in the American Civil War =

The present-day state of Nebraska was still a territory of the United States during the American Civil War. It did not achieve statehood until March 1867, two years after the war ended. Nevertheless, the Nebraska Territory contributed significantly to the Union war effort.

== Before the Civil War ==
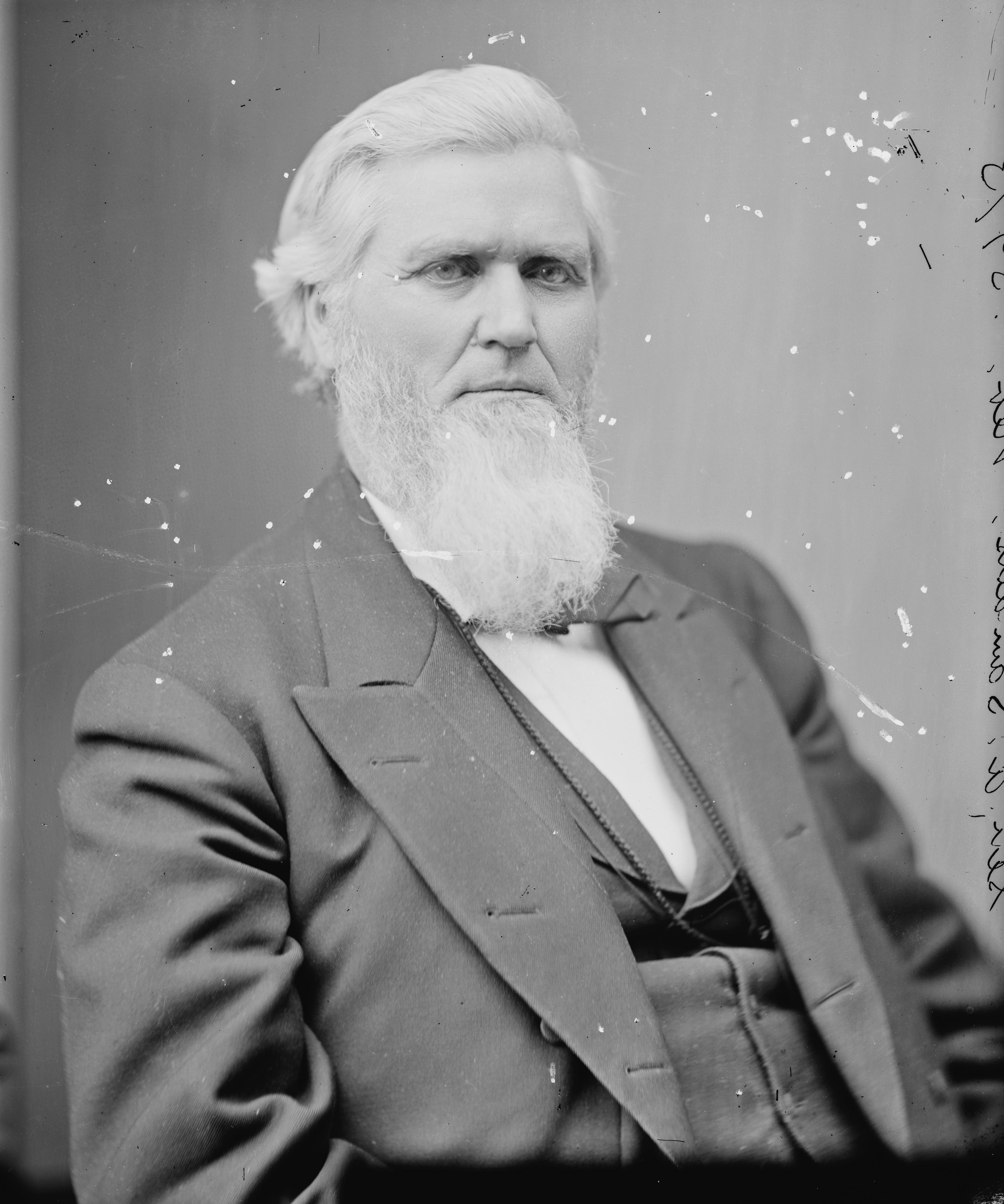
Territorial Governor Alvin Saunders

Pre-Civil War era Nebraska Territory was largely rural and unsettled, at the edge of the American frontier. The Kansas–Nebraska Act of 1854 had established the 40th parallel north as the dividing line between the territories of Kansas and Nebraska. It had also repealed the Missouri Compromise of 1820 and allowed settlers in those territories to determine if they would allow slavery within their boundaries. Like the early Kansas settlers, Nebraska residents were commonly migrants from the Northern United States and chose to exclude slavery from their territory.

Anti-secession feelings ran strong in the fledgling Nebraska Territory. Seward County was originally called Greene County, after a popular U.S. Army general from Missouri, but after General Greene joined the Confederacy, the county was renamed for William H. Seward, Secretary of State to President Abraham Lincoln.

On the night of February 15, 1861 a group of armed secessionist took possession of the old Fort Kearny. The group raised a palmetto flag with the motto: "South Rights," from the flag staff. The following day large party of armed unionist attacked the fort and skirmished with the rebels, after the battle they forced the rebels out of the fort. The men torn down the palmetto flag than raised the Stars and Stripes.

As the war began in April 1861, Algernon Paddock was serving as the territorial secretary, the highest office. On May 15, Alvin Saunders, a staunch Republican and supporter of President Lincoln, was sworn in as the formal Governor of Nebraska Territory. He served in that capacity throughout the war.

== Nebraska contributions to the war efforts ==
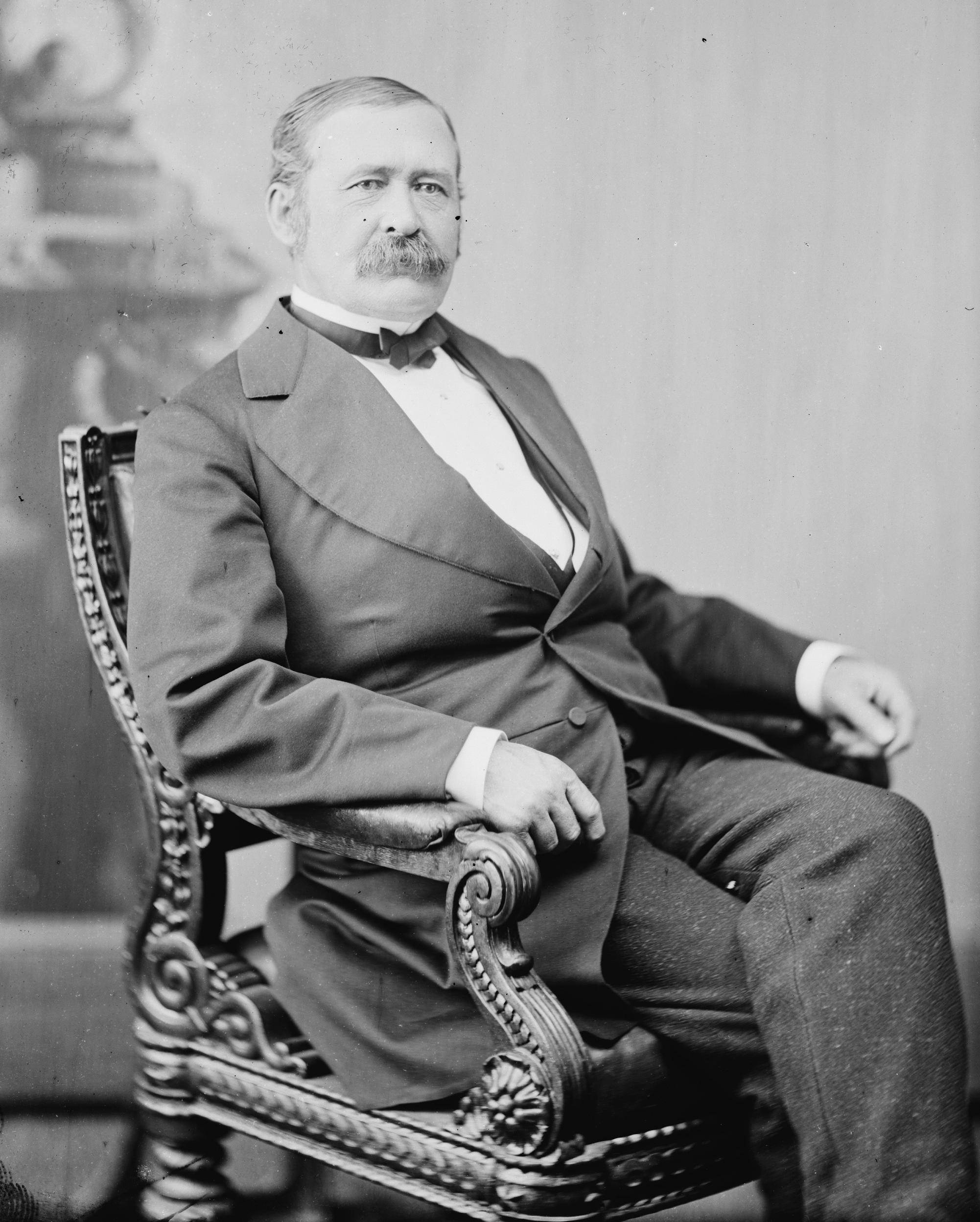
John M. Thayer, postwar image

No Civil War battles or skirmishes were fought within the territorial borders of Nebraska, nor did Confederate troops attempt to invade the area, but Nebraskans did serve in the Union Army. When the war started, U.S. Regular Army troops were withdrawn from Fort Kearny and Fort Randall to serve in more threatened areas, increasing risk to Nebraska settlers from Indian attacks. The Federal government requested that the Nebraska Territory form one volunteer regiment, with some companies supposed to stay behind to protect the territory. The territorial legislature met in special session in Omaha and agreed to raise the requested local defense force. Thus, the 1st Regiment Nebraska Volunteer Infantry was formed in June and July 1861, with the future governor of Nebraska and the Wyoming Territory, John Milton Thayer, as its first colonel. However, the promise was reneged, and the regiment was sent eastward in August to fight the Confederacy.

Serving in the forces under Ulysses S. Grant, the 1st Nebraska Infantry participated in the successful attack on Fort Donelson in Tennessee and then fought at the Battle of Shiloh in April 1862. It then participated in several minor engagements in Missouri and Arkansas. In October 1863, the regiment was changed from infantry into cavalry, and was transferred to the frontier to keep the Plains Indians in check. It was mustered out of the Union Army in 1866.

Later in the war, some of the soldiers who served at Fort Kearny were former Confederates who had changed their allegiance to the Union, thus becoming "galvanized Yankees".

By the end of the Civil War, more than a third (3,157) of the men of military age in the Nebraska Territory had served in the Union Army. In addition to the 1st Nebraska, the territory raised three other full regiments of cavalry, as well as several battalions of militia. Thirty-five Nebraskans were killed in action during the war, while another 204 died of other causes, including disease and accidents.

Today, several active groups exist in the state of Nebraska that trace their organizational ancestry to Nebraska postwar veterans groups, including the Grand Army of the Republic, the Sons of Union Veterans of the Civil War, and the Military Order of the Loyal Legion of the United States (MOLLUS).

== See also ==
- List of Nebraska Civil War units
