= Dobytown, Nebraska =

- Dobytown
- U.S. National Register of Historic Places
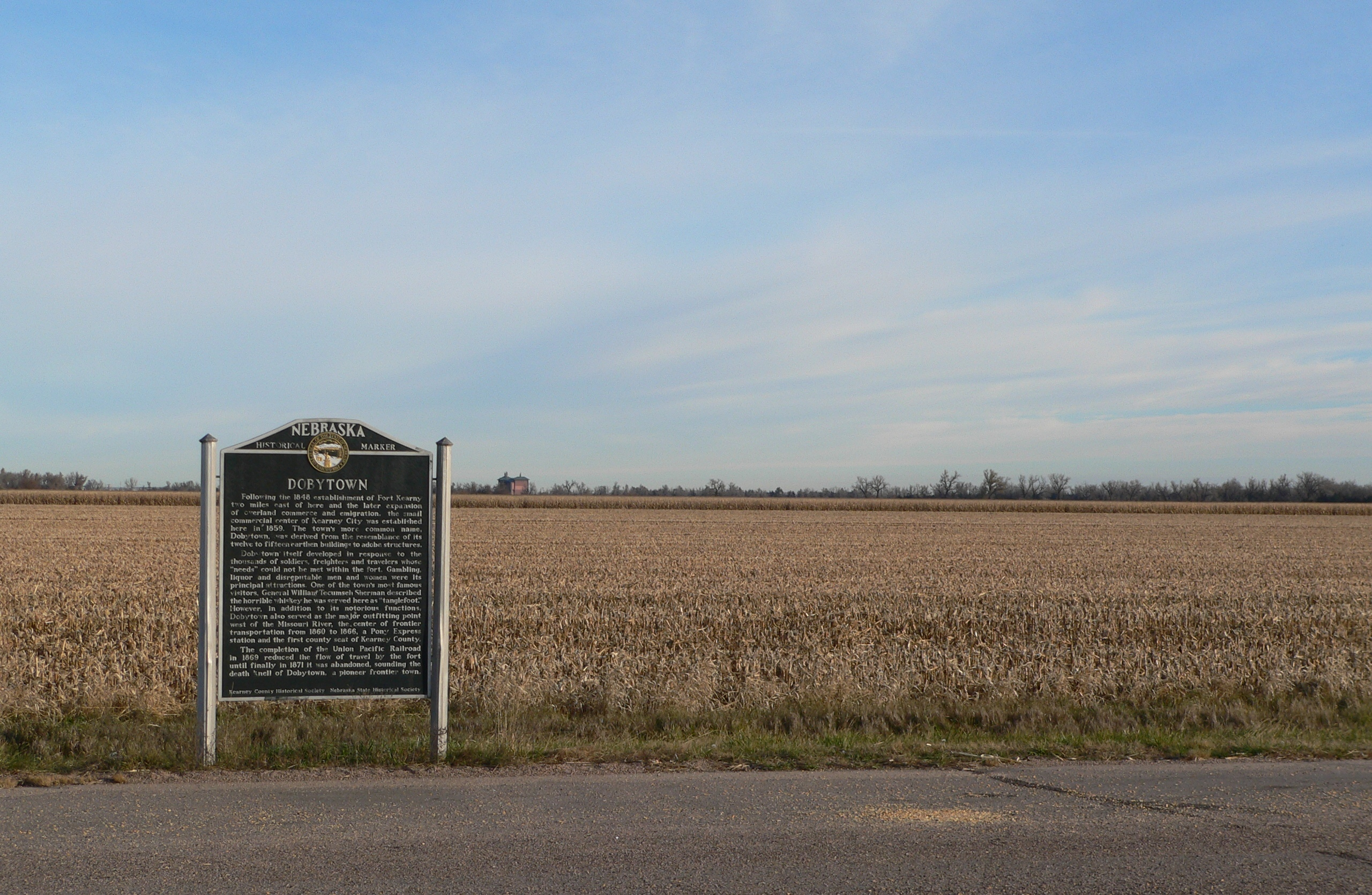
- Commemorative plaque at the Dobytown site

- Location within Nebraska Location within the United States
- Location: Kearney County, Nebraska
- Nearest city: Kearney, Nebraska
- Coordinates: 40°38′30″N 99°2′51″W
- Built: 1859
- NRHP reference No.: 74001125
- Added to NRHP: December 16, 1974

Dobytown is a ghost town in Kearney County, Nebraska, United States, three miles west of Fort Kearny. Officially named Kearney City, the community was established in 1859. The town was given the common name of Dobytown because it contained mostly adobe buildings. Although the community no longer exists, the site was added to the National Register of Historic Places in 1974. The site is located at an altitude of 2,129 feet (649 m).

As one of the most important stops for travelers between Independence, Missouri, and the West Coast, Dobytown evolved to meet the needs of the thousands of soldiers, traders, teamsters, and pioneers traveling west. Gambling, liquor, and prostitution were among its main attractions. Dobytown also served as the major outfitting point west of the Missouri River, the center of frontier transportation from 1860 to 1866. A Pony Express station was located in Dobytown, and it was the first county seat of Kearney County.

One of Dobytown's most famous visitors, General William Tecumseh Sherman, described the horrible whiskey he was served there as tanglefoot.

The completion of the Union Pacific Railroad in 1869 reduced the travel along the trail and by the fort. The U.S. Army issued an order for abandonment of Fort Kearny on 22 May 1871. This caused Dobytown to be abandoned.

== See also ==
- List of ghost towns in Nebraska
