= Daniel Phineas Woodbury =

Union Army general (1812–1864)

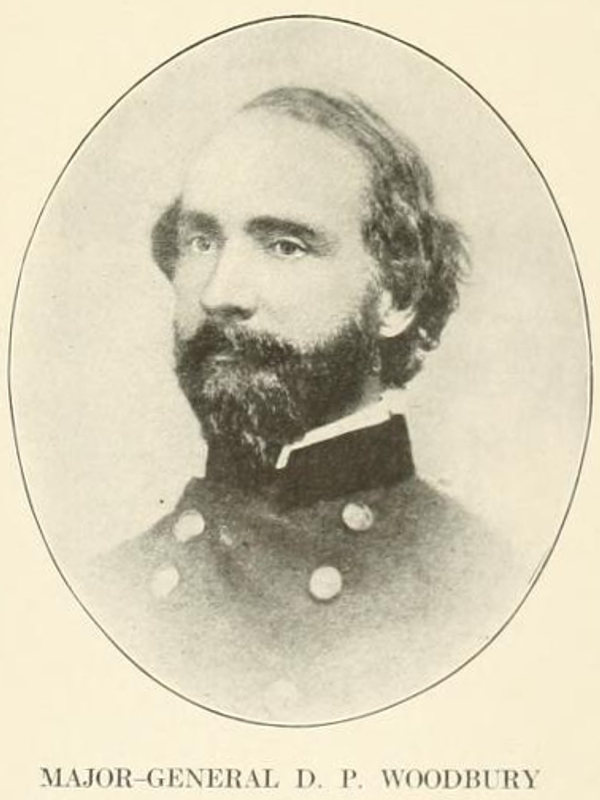
- Born: December 16, 1812; New London, New Hampshire, U.S.
- Died: August 15, 1864 (aged 51); Key West, Florida, U.S.
- Burial place: Barrancas National Cemetery; Pensacola, Florida, U.S.
- Military career
- Allegiance: United States of America; Union
- Branch: United States Army; Union Army
- Service years: 1836-1864
- Rank: Major General
- Conflicts: American Civil War; First Battle of Bull Run; Peninsula Campaign; Northern Virginia Campaign; Battle of Fredericksburg

Daniel Phineas Woodbury (December 16, 1812 – August 15, 1864) was an American soldier and an engineer during the American Civil War.

== Birth and early years ==
Woodbury was born at New London, New Hampshire. He graduated at West Point in 1836, entered the artillery as a second lieutenant, and until 1840 served as assistant engineer in building the Cumberland Road. He superintended the construction of Forts Kearney and Laramie (1847–50), but in 1851 he was recalled to the East. He published works on Sustaining Walls (1845) and the Theory of the Arch (1858).

Woodbury supervised construction of Fort Jefferson and the Dry Tortugas Light.

== Civil War ==
In 1861 he was appointed to be major of engineers and lieutenant colonel on the staff. He fought at the First Battle of Bull Run, afterward was engaged until 1862 upon the defenses of Washington, D.C.. He then commanded the Engineer Brigade during the Peninsula Campaign and the Northern Virginia Campaign, as well as during the Battle of Antietam. At Fredericksburg, he earned the brevet of brigadier general in the regular army for his efforts in supervising the construction of several pontoon bridges across the Rappahannock River. From December 1862 to March 1863, he participated in the Rappahannock campaign. Later in 1863 he was commandant of the district of Key West and the Tortugas, where he died of yellow fever on August 15, 1864.

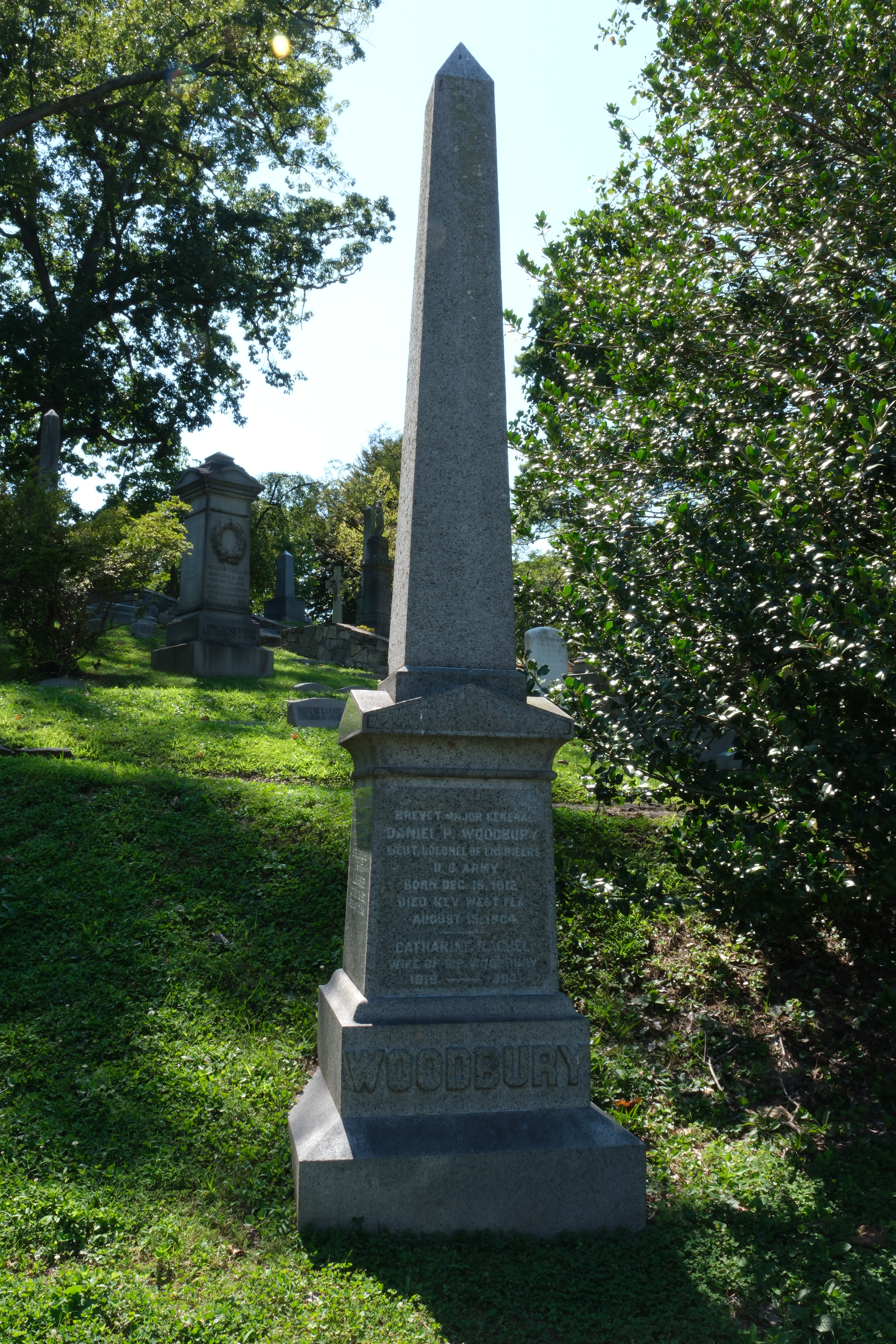
Woodbury Monument at Oak Hill Cemetery

A monument to Woodbury is at Oak Hill Cemetery in Washington, D.C.

== See also ==
- List of American Civil War generals (Union)
