= Frederick Aiken =

American lawyer, journalist, and soldier (1832–1878)

Frederick Augustus Aiken
- Born: September 20, 1832; Lowell, Massachusetts, US
- Died: December 23, 1878 (aged 46); Washington, D.C., US
- Burial place: Oak Hill Cemetery
- Military career
- Allegiance: United States
- Service years: 1861–1865
- Rank: Colonel
- Conflicts: American Civil War
- Other work: Defense attorney for Mary Surratt, conspirator in the assassination of Abraham Lincoln; editor of The Washington Post

Frederick Augustus Aiken (September 20, 1832 – December 23, 1878) was an American lawyer, journalist and soldier. A veteran of the Civil War, Aiken was called on to serve as one of the defense attorneys for Mary Surratt, who was tried for conspiracy in the assassination of President Abraham Lincoln.

== Biography ==
Information on Aiken's early life is largely unknown; his date of birth, city of birth, and even his full name varies depending on source. His official birth records, as well as the 1840 and 1850 census records, indicate that he was born Frederick Augustus Aiken on September 20, 1832, in Lowell, Massachusetts, to Susan (née Rice) and Solomon S. Aiken. His obituary in The Washington Post uses the middle name "Argyle", an 1837 birth year, and claims he was born in Boston.

The family moved to Hardwick, Vermont when Aiken was ten years old. He attended Middlebury College where he studied journalism, and later became editor of the Burlington Sentinel. Aiken married Sarah Weston, daughter of a Vermont judge, on June 1, 1857. In 1859 he was admitted to the Vermont bar, and in 1860 the Aikens moved to Washington, D.C., where Aiken served as secretary to the Democratic National Committee and supported the candidacy of Vice President John C. Breckinridge Democrat of Kentucky in the 1860 presidential election. When the Civil War began, Aiken also wrote a letter to Jefferson Davis, offering his services to the Confederacy as a reporter.

== Civil War ==
Despite his apparent sympathies for the Confederacy as indicated by his support of Breckinridge (who became a general in the Confederate Army) and his letter to Davis, Aiken served in the Union Army during the Civil War, but like his birth records, his war service also remains largely unknown, other than the fact that he had earned the rank of colonel by war's end. Two pieces of correspondence concerning his war service appear in the Official Records of the War of the Rebellion. The first is a dispatch from then-Captain Aiken to General Winfield Scott Hancock during the Battle of Williamsburg in 1862, referring to Aiken as an acting aide-de-camp; the other is a dispatch from Hancock himself, praising Aiken and other officers, and referring to him as a volunteer aide-de-camp to Hancock's division commander, General William Farrar Smith. His obituary points to his being wounded in combat, including a battle during which he had two horses shot from under him, but it is not revealed what battles he participated in besides Williamsburg.

== Mary Surratt trial ==
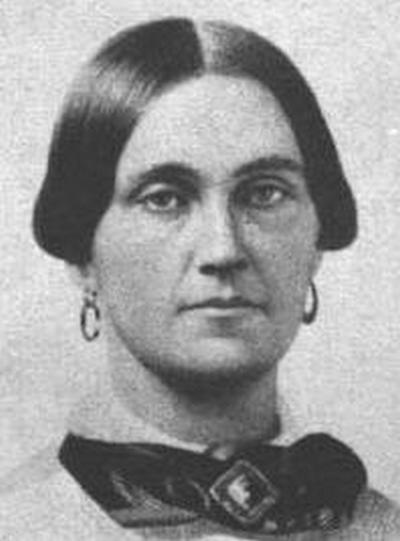
Mary Surratt in 1850

President Lincoln was assassinated on April 14, 1865, and his assassin, John Wilkes Booth, was himself killed less than two weeks later. Booth's accomplices were all arrested before the end of April, and brought before a military tribunal chaired by Major General David Hunter. The sole female defendant was Mary Surratt, the owner of the boarding house in Washington where Booth and the other conspirators had often met. Mrs. Surratt's official defense counsel was Reverdy Johnson, a former Attorney General and then-Senator from Maryland; however, several members of the panel challenged Johnson's right to defend Surratt as he had objected to requiring loyalty oaths from voters during the 1864 presidential election. Though the objection was withdrawn, Johnson nonetheless did not participate much in the process, and left much of the legal defense to Aiken and John Clampitt, who had recently set up their own law practice in Washington.

Still relatively new to their professions and without Johnson's active participation in the case, Aiken and Clampitt were woefully unprepared for their task. Their defense relied on trying to debunk the testimony of the prosecution's two chief witnesses, John M. Lloyd and Louis J. Weichmann, but instead ended up strengthening the prosecution's case. Ultimately, the defense was unsuccessful, and Mary Surratt was sent to the gallows on July 7, 1865.

== Later life ==
Aiken and Clampitt's law practice dissolved in 1866, likely as a result of the backlash of the trial. The New York Times reported that Aiken was arrested in June 1866 when he cashed a check with a merchant but did not have the funds to cover the amount. His obituary stated that he had also been tapped to serve as defense counsel for Jefferson Davis, but the former Confederate President was eventually released without trial. In 1868, Aiken returned to journalism, and served as the first city editor of the Washington Post.

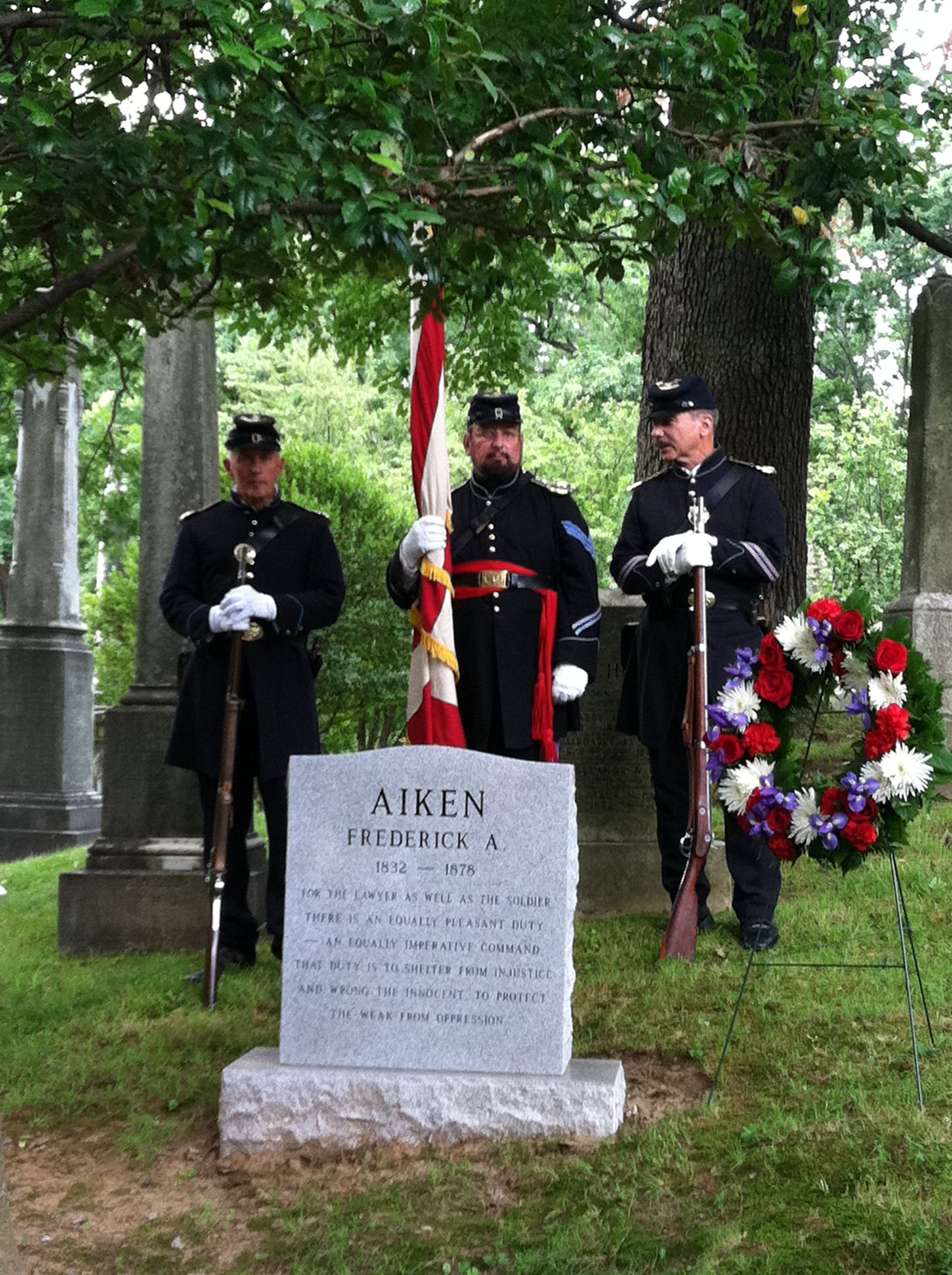
The new gravestone for Frederick Aiken

Aiken died in Washington on December 23, 1878, as a result of heart-related illness, possibly resulting from wounds he incurred during the war. He is buried in Oak Hill Cemetery in Washington, where his grave was originally unmarked. However, the Surratt Society of Clinton, Maryland (the town formerly known as Surrattsville) conducted a campaign to raise funds to place a tombstone on the unmarked grave. On June 14, 2012, a gravestone was placed at the site, in a dedication ceremony attended by descendants of Aiken's family.

== In popular culture ==
Aiken's involvement in Mary Surratt's defense is dramatized in the 2010 film The Conspirator. He was portrayed by James McAvoy.
