= The Conspirator =

2010 American historical drama film by Robert Redford

- Theatrical release poster
- Directed by: Robert Redford
- Screenplay by: James D. Solomon
- Story by: James D. Solomon; Gregory Bernstein
- Produced by: Robert Redford; Brian Falk; Bill Holderman; Greg Shapiro; Robert Stone
- Starring: James McAvoy; Robin Wright; Kevin Kline; Evan Rachel Wood; Danny Huston; Justin Long; Colm Meaney; Tom Wilkinson
- Cinematography: Newton Thomas Sigel
- Edited by: Craig McKay
- Music by: Mark Isham
- Production companies: American Film Company; Wildwood Enterprises, Inc
- Distributed by: Lionsgate; Roadside Attractions (United States and Canada); Focus Features International (International)
- Release dates: September 11, 2010 (TIFF); April 15, 2011
- Running time: 122 minutes
- Country: United States
- Language: English
- Budget: $25 million
- Box office: $15.5 million

The Conspirator is a 2010 American mystery historical drama film directed by Robert Redford and based on an original screenplay by James D. Solomon. It is the debut film of the American Film Company. The film tells the story of Mary Surratt, the only female conspirator charged in the Abraham Lincoln assassination and the first woman to be executed by the US federal government. It stars Robin Wright as Mary Surratt, together with James McAvoy, Justin Long, Evan Rachel Wood, Jonathan Groff, Tom Wilkinson, Alexis Bledel, Kevin Kline, John Cullum, Toby Kebbell, and James Badge Dale.

The Conspirator premiered at the Toronto International Film Festival on September 11, 2010 followed by a special premiere screening on March 29, 2011 at the Abraham Lincoln Presidential Library and Museum in Springfield, Illinois. Another premiere screening was held on April 10, 2011 at Ford's Theatre in Washington, DC, the site of the assassination. The US theatrical release took place on April 15, 2011, the 146th anniversary of the death of Lincoln. The film was released in Canada on April 29, 2011 and was in the UK on July 1, 2011. Lionsgate Home Entertainment released the DVD and Blu-ray on August 16, 2011.

== Plot ==
On April 14, 1865, five days after the Civil War ends with Robert E. Lee's surrender to Ulysses S. Grant at Appomattox Court House, Virginia, Union veteran Frederick Aiken, with his friends, William Thomas Hamilton and Nicholas Baker, and his wife, Sarah Weston, celebrate. Later that night, after John Wilkes Booth enters Ford’s Theater, his henchman Lewis Powell stabs but fails to kill Secretary of State William Seward. German carriage repairshop owner George Atzerodt is assigned to kill Vice President Andrew Johnson, but cowardly gets drunk. Meanwhile, Booth sneaks into the President's box and shoots his target, President Abraham Lincoln in the back of the head as he watches the play, Our American Cousin. Booth stabs Major Henry Rathbone, a guest in Lincoln's box, and leaps onto the stage, shouting, "Sic Semper Tyrannis! The South is avenged!" before escaping into Maryland. A crowd, including Aiken, Hamilton, and Baker, watches in horror as the unconscious President is taken to a nearby boarding house, where he dies early the next morning. Andrew Johnson becomes the next President.

Secretary of War Edwin Stanton orders the arrest of all suspects, including Mary Surratt. Booth and David Herold manage to evade capture for two weeks, but Union soldiers find a barn where they suspect the conspirators are hiding and set it on fire. Herold surrenders while Booth is fatally shot by Sergeant Boston Corbett.

Maryland Senator Reverdy Johnson, Aiken's boss, is Mary Surratt's defense attorney. Her son, John Surratt, has escaped and now hundreds of agents are looking for him. Also charged are Herold, Powell, Atzerodt, Michael O'Laughlen, Edman Spangler, Samuel Mudd, and Samuel Arnold. Reverdy feels unable to defend Surratt because he is a Southerner and asks a reluctant Aiken who is a Northerner to take over the defense.

Aiken visits Mary in her cell to question her. Mary asks Aiken to look in on her daughter, Anna. Aiken does so and searches the boarding house for clues. He finds a ticket with the initials "LJW" (Louis J. Weichmann). At the court, Weichmann, a seminary friend of Mary's son John, is the first witness. He describes John's meetings with Booth, and points out Herold, Powell, and Atzerodt as frequent guests in Mary's boarding house. Aiken incriminates Weichmann by making him appear as guilty as the rest of the conspirators.

Aiken again tries to stop defending Mary because he believes that she is guilty. He meets with her intending to get evidence of her guilt when she explains that John and the others conspired to kidnap Lincoln, not to kill him. They were about to attack a carriage but were stopped by Booth, who reported that Lincoln was elsewhere. She says that John left town and went into hiding two weeks before the assassination and that she has no idea where he is. Aiken asks Anna for information to help with his trial preparations, but she refuses.

At the court, Chief Prosecutor Joseph Holt brings the innkeeper John Lloyd to the stand. Lloyd claims that Mary gave him binoculars to give to Booth and told him to prepare shooting irons and whiskey for Booth and Herold on the night of the assassination. Aiken angers Lloyd by implying that he, an admitted alcoholic, was bribed with whiskey for his testimony. Lloyd is dragged out of the courtroom after he threatens Aiken.

Aiken arrives at the Century Club to attend a party and discovers that his membership has been revoked for defending Mary Surratt. This triggers an argument with Sarah, who disowns and leaves him. Aiken asks Anna to testify. Anna testifies that Mary had no part in the assassination of Lincoln and that it was her brother John who did. Anna visits Aiken at his house and tells him about Booth and John. Aiken then visits Father Jacob Walter, who has been attending to Mary, but he also insists he does not know where John is. Aiken asks Walter to deliver a message to John saying that his mother will hang for his crimes if he does not surrender. On July 6, Mary is found guilty on all charges and is at first sentenced to life in prison, but with Stanton's intervention, she is then sentenced to hang with Powell, Herold, and Atzerodt while Mudd, Arnold, O'Laughlen, and Spangler are given prison sentences. Aiken procures a writ of habeas corpus, signed by a reluctant Judge Andrew Wylie, for the release of Mary so that she can be tried in a civilian court, but President Johnson suspends the writ, and the four condemned prisoners are hanged.

Sixteen months later, Aiken visits John Surratt, who thanks him for his kindness to his mother. Aiken offers him Mary's rosary, but he declines. The epilogue goes on to state that a year later, the US Supreme Court ruled that civilians were entitled to trial by a civilian jury, not a military tribunal, even in times of war (Ex parte Milligan), and that a jury of Northerners and Southerners could not agree on a verdict for John Surratt, and he was freed. Aiken left the law and became The Washington Post's first City Editor.

== Cast ==
- James McAvoy as Captain Frederick Aiken, an idealistic young war hero who reluctantly defends Surratt and, in the process, comes to believe in her innocence
- Robin Wright as Mary Surratt, the only woman among the group charged with killing Lincoln
- Evan Rachel Wood as Anna Surratt, Mary Surratt's daughter
- Kevin Kline as Edwin Stanton, Secretary of War
- Tom Wilkinson as Reverdy Johnson, a former attorney general and current US Senator who is Aiken's mentor
- Alexis Bledel as Sarah Weston, Aiken's girlfriend
- Danny Huston as Brigadier General Joseph Holt, the prosecuting attorney
- Stephen Root as John M. Lloyd, a principal witness for the prosecution
- Jonathan Groff as Louis Weichmann, a principal witness for the prosecution
- Justin Long as Nicholas Baker, Aiken's best friend, an injured Civil War veteran
- Johnny Simmons as John Surratt, Mary Surratt's son
- Toby Kebbell as John Wilkes Booth, the actor who assassinates Lincoln.
- Norman Reedus as Lewis Powell, Booth's henchman who attempts to assassinate William H. Seward
- John Cullum as Andrew Wylie, a judge of the Supreme Court of the District of Columbia who reluctantly signs Aiken's writ to retry Marry Surratt
- Marcus Hester as David Herold, one of the conspirators
- Colm Meaney as Major General David Hunter, president of the military commission that tries the conspirators
- Shea Whigham as Captain Cottingham, a witness for the defense
- James Badge Dale as William Hamilton, a friend of Aiken's
- Jim True-Frost as Brigadier General John F. Hartranft, commander of the Old Capitol Prison
- John Michael Weatherly as George Atzerodt, a conspirator
- Chris Bauer as Major Smith, a witness for the prosecution
- David Andrews as Father Walter, a Roman Catholic priest attending on Mrs. Surratt
- James Kirk Sparks as Edman Spangler, one of those charged with conspiracy
- John Curran as Major General Albion P. Howe, a member of the military commission
- Robert C. Treveiler as Major General Thomas Maley Harris, a member of the military commission
- Brian F. Durkin as a lieutenant
- Cullen Moss as Stanton's officer
- Jason Hatfield as Harry Hawk, the actor playing Asa Trenchard in Our American Cousin, the play being watched by the Lincolns
- Gerald Bestrom as Abraham Lincoln, the President who is assassinated in the beginning of the film. Bestrom, who does not speak, was a professional Lincoln lookalike who died in April 2012.
- Marshall Canney as Mary Todd Lincoln, Lincoln's wife
- Andy Martin as Major Henry Rathbone, present in Lincoln's box during the assassination
- Dennis Clark as Andrew Johnson, Vice President and then President
- Amy Tipton as Female Guest #2
- Glenn R. Wilder as William H. Seward, Secretary of State
- Brian Duffy as Frederick W. Seward, Seward's son
- Cal Johnson as Army Sergeant
- John Bankson as Alexander Gardner, the photographer of the executions
- Craig Crumpton as Major General Robert Sanford Foster, a member of the military commission
- John Deifer as Brigadier General James A. Ekin, a member of the military commission
- Ron Stafford as Benn Pitman, stenographer at the trial
- Jeremy Tuttle as Samuel Arnold, one of the conspirators

== Production ==
Principal photography began in October 2009, in Savannah, Georgia and wrapped in December 2009. Fort Pulaski National Monument, located east of Savannah, served as the military prison in the film. Civil war reenactors and living historians were used to portray soldiers in various scenes. To supplement the reenactors, extras from the local community were also employed as soldiers.

The Mary E. Surratt Boarding House still stands, and is located at 604 H Street NW in Washington D.C.'s Chinatown. Mary Surratt's farmhouse in Clinton, Maryland, is now a museum. The town in which the farmhouse stands was originally called Surrattsville. The United States Post Office renamed the town Robeysville due to the notoriety of the Surratt name. In 1879, Robeysville was renamed Clinton.

== Release ==
The Conspirator premiered at the Toronto International Film Festival on September 11, 2010. A few days after its screening, the film was acquired by Lionsgate and Roadside Attractions for distribution. The film was released theatrically on April 15, 2011.

== Reception ==
=== Box office ===
The film performed poorly at the box office grossing only $3,506,602 during its opening weekend. After its initial run, the film grossed $11,538,204 domestically with a worldwide total of $15,478,800. Because the film had a budget of $25 million, the film is considered a box office flop.

=== Critical reception ===
Upon its release, the film received a mixed reception from critics. Metacritic gave the film a weighted average score of 55/100 based on 37 reviews, indicating "mixed or average reviews". Rotten Tomatoes reports that 56% of critics have given the film a positive review based on 173 reviews, with an average score of 6.1/10. The website's critical consensus states that "The Conspirator is well cast and tells a worthy story, but many viewers will lack the patience for Redford's deliberate, stagebound approach."

Critics have cited it as an analogy to the post-9/11 atmosphere. In the October 2011 edition of Sound & Vision, Ken Korman singled out attention for the presentation of the home release, saying that the "soft" visuals on the Blu-Ray "compliments the film's intentionally rustic look" and found the DTS-HD Master Audio mix on the disc to be sufficient. Writing for Jacobin in 2015, Eileen Jones criticized the film for promoting the Lost Cause of the Confederacy.
