= Mary Surratt House =

Mary Surratt House may refer to either of two historic houses associated with Mary E. Surratt:

- Surratt House Museum, in Clinton, Maryland, also known as Mary Surratt House
- Mary E. Surratt Boarding House, in Washington, D.C., also known as Mary E. Surratt House
