= American Film Company =

American Film Company may refer to:

- American Film Manufacturing Company, also called Flying "A" Studios, an early motion picture production company based in Santa Barbara, California
- Mutual Film, a motion picture conglomerate and distributor for movie studios including Flying "A"
- American Film Company (2008), a film production company founded in 2008
