= Loto =

Loto may refer to:

- Loto (actor), Cambodian actor
- Loto (band), a Portuguese band
- Loto (crater), a crater on Mars
- Loto (Pukapuka), a village on the island of Wale in the Pukapuka atoll of the Cook Islands
- Loto, various lotteries, see list of lotteries
- Lockout–tagout or LOTO, a safety procedure
- Leader of the Opposition, a role in Parliamentary systems of government

== See also ==
- Lotto (disambiguation)
