= Motu Kō =

Island in Pukapuka Atoll, Cook Islands

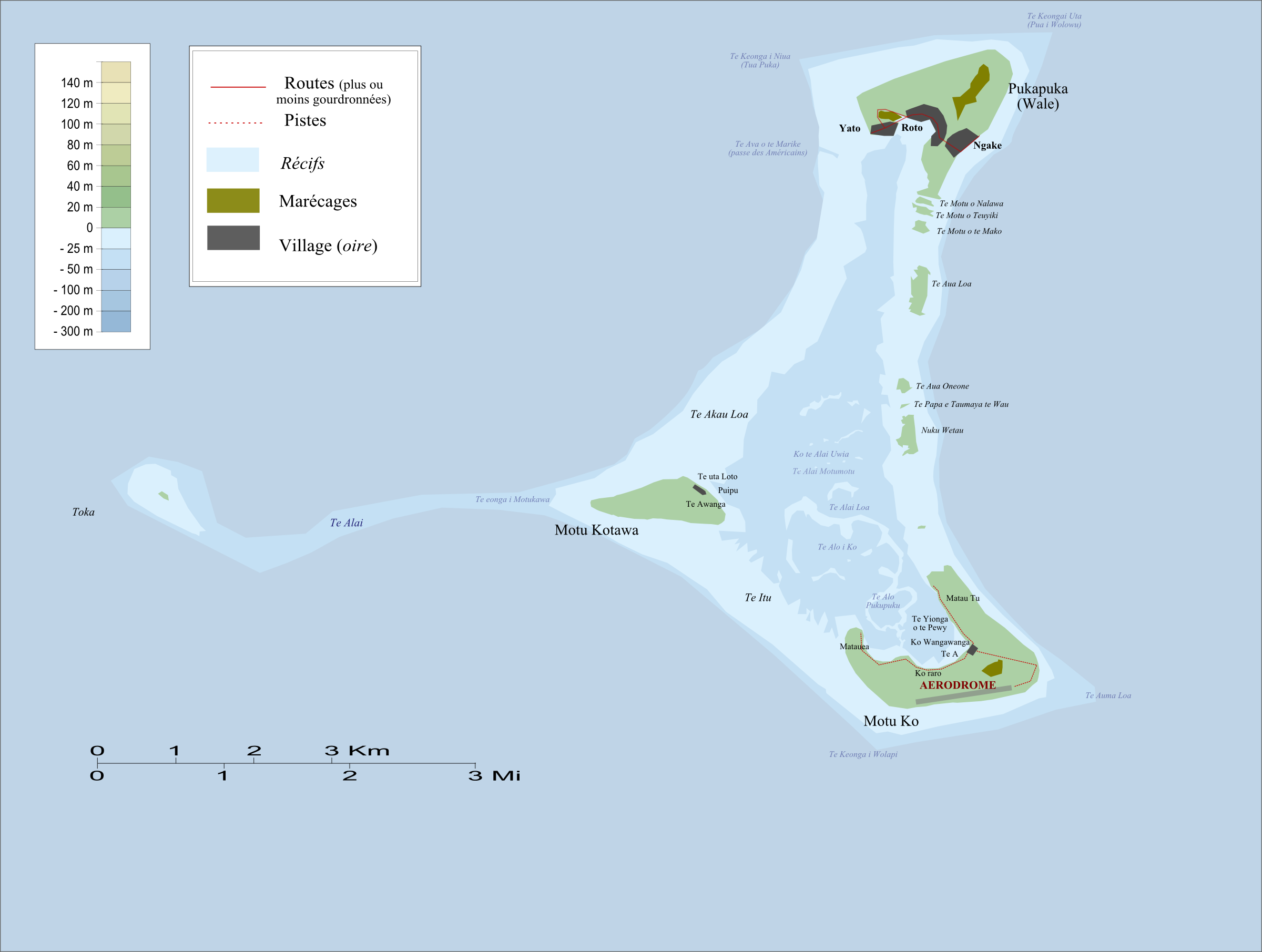
- Map of Pukapuka Atoll; Motu Kō forms the southern apex

Geography
- Location: Pacific Ocean
- Coordinates: 10°54′52.31″S 165°50′21.63″W
- Archipelago: Cook Islands
- Highest elevation: 5 m (16 ft)

Administration
- Cook Islands
- Island: Pukapuka

Demographics
- Population: 0
- Ethnic groups: Uninhabited

Motu Kō is one of three islands in the Pukapuka atoll of the Cook Islands. It forms the southern apex of Pukapuka's triangular atoll, 10km south of Wale, and is the largest of the three islands. The island is low-lying, with a maximum elevation of 5 meters above sea level and most of it only one or two meters. Motu Kō is uninhabited and used as a food source, and is regulated by the village of Ngake.

Pukapuka Island Airport is located on Motu Kō.
