= Pukapuka =

Atoll in the northern Cook Islands

Native name: Te Ulu o te Watu
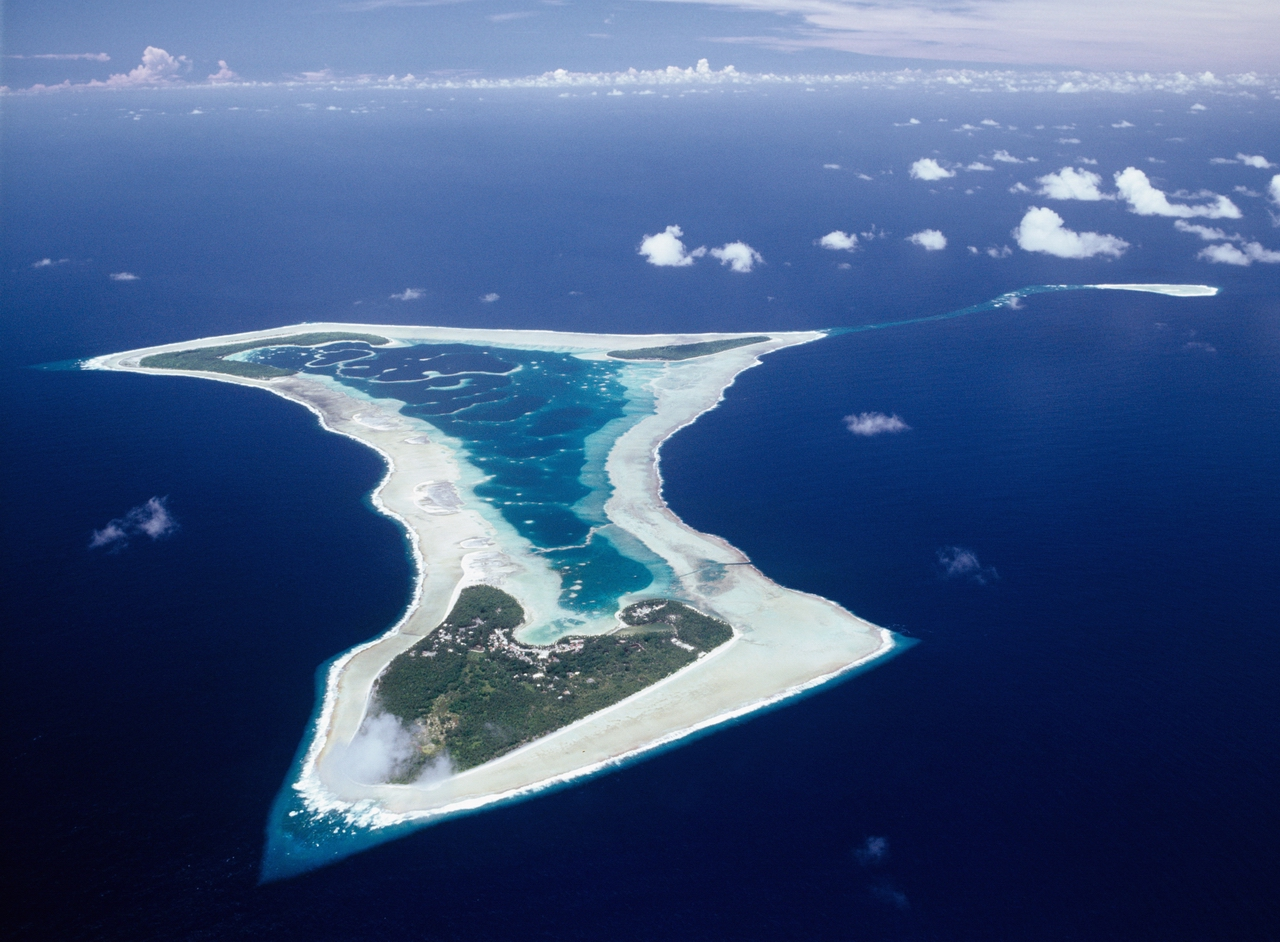
- Aerial view of Pukapuka Atoll
- Interactive map of Pukapuka

Geography
- Location: Central-Southern Pacific Ocean
- Coordinates: 10°53′00″S 165°51′00″W
- Archipelago: Cook Islands
- Area: 5 km^{2} (1.9 sq mi)

Administration
- Cook Islands

Demographics
- Population: 456 (2021)
- Ethnic groups: Polynesian

Location of Pukapuka Atoll in the Pacific Ocean

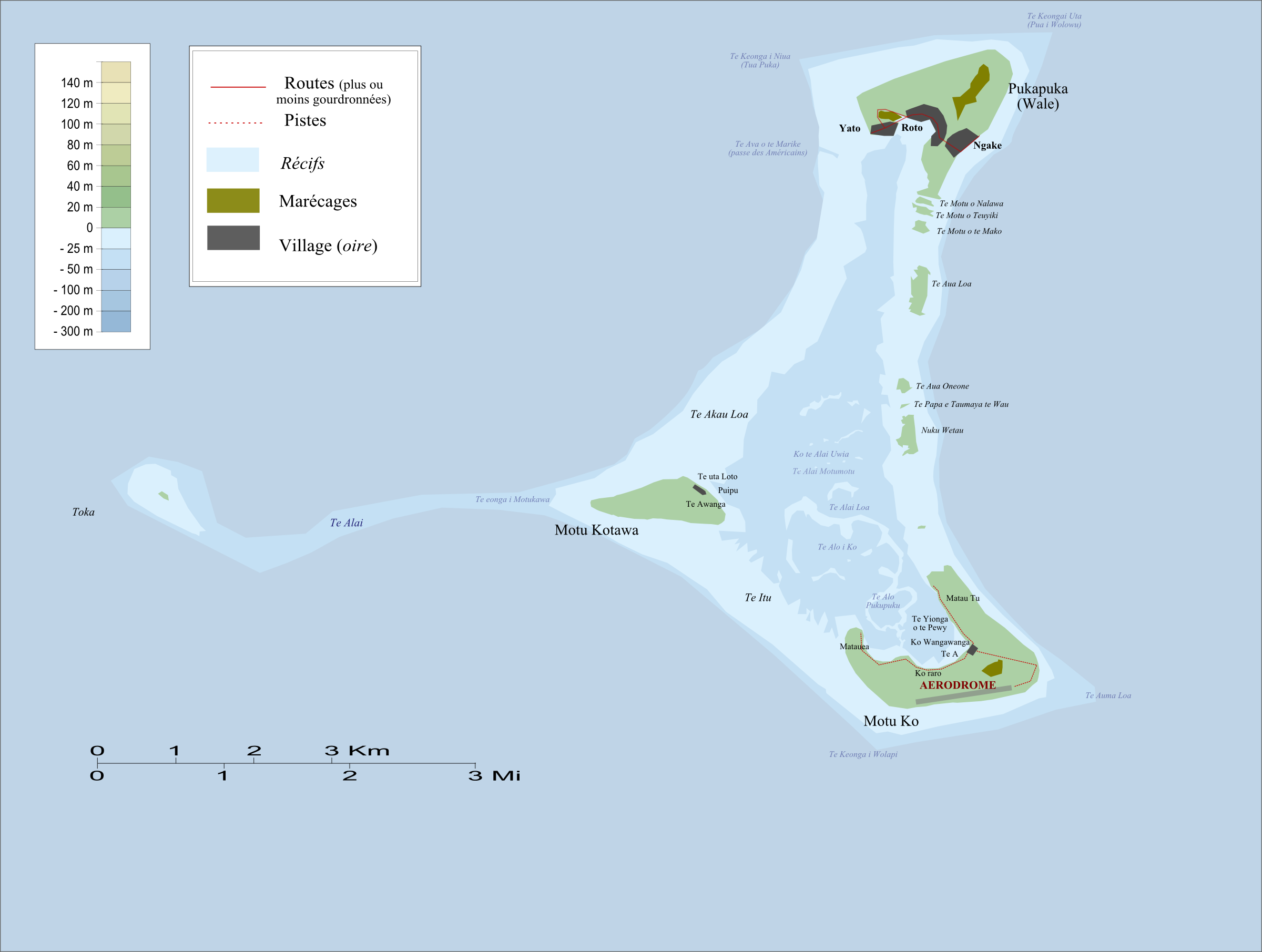
Map of Pukapuka Atoll

Pukapuka, formerly Danger Island, is a coral atoll in the northern group of the Cook Islands in the Pacific Ocean. It is one of the most remote islands of the Cook Islands, situated about 1,140 kilometres (708 miles) northwest of Rarotonga. On this small island, an ancient culture and distinct language have been maintained over many centuries. The population of Pukapuka is around 400 people.

== Etymology ==
The traditional name for the atoll is Te Ulu-o-Te-Watu ("The Head of the Rock"), The modern name Pukapuka (sometimes written as Bukabuka) originally applied to the main island of the atoll, and is of uncertain etymology. In modern times, the main island is often called Wale ("Home").

Pukapuka has been given various names by European explorers. Pedro Fernandes de Queirós sighted an island in 1595, likely Pukapuka, and called this San Bernardo. On 21 June 1765 John Byron sighted Pukapuka, calling it Islands of Danger, as he was unable to land due to high surf. A version of this name, Danger Island, became common use in English. French captain Pierre François Péron named the atoll Îles de la Loutre ("Islands of the Otter") when he visited on 3 April 1796.

== Geography ==
Pukapuka is shaped like a three-bladed fan. There are three islets on the roughly triangular reef, with a total land area of approximately 3 square kilometres (1.2 sq mi). Motu Kō, the biggest island, is to the southeast; Motu Kotawa (Frigatebird Island) is to the southwest; and the main island Wale is to the north. Toka sand cay is to the west of the atoll, separated from Motu Kotawa by a reef. Kō and Motu Kotawa are uninhabited food reserves, with taro and pulaka gardens and coconut plantations. Pukapuka Airport (ICAO: NCPK / IATA: PZK) is on Kō.

The three villages are located on the crescent-shaped bay of the northernmost islet of the atoll: Yātō (West), Loto (Central) and Ngake (East). Loto (Roto on most maps) is host to the Island Administration. The traditional names for these villages are Takanumi, Kotipolo and Te Lāngaikula. In daily life, the islanders frequently call them Tiapani (Japan), Malike or Amelika (United States) and Ōlani (Holland) respectively. In sports competitions between the villages, the villagers use the names and flags of these countries.

The submerged Tima Reef is situated 23 km southeast of Pukapuka. About 60 km away is Nassau (Cook Islands) which is owned by the people of Pukapuka and considered part of it for administrative purposes. Since the 1950s it has been governed by the Council of Chiefs of Pukapuka. The Nassau Island Committee advises the Pukapuka Island Committee on matters relating to its own island.

== History ==
Human settlement of Pukapuka can be dated back about 1,000 years, after the sea level stabilised to its present height. According to oral tradition the island was discovered by Tamayei, a god from Tonga, and settled by ancestors from Tonga. The atoll served as a connecting hub between West and East Polynesia – a role that is reflected in Pukapukan material culture, and language, which is Samoic with a Tokelauan influence. Pukapukan traditions speak of frequent passages to Tuvalu, Tokelau, Niue, Tonga, Rarotonga and Tahiti, and basalt used for many of their adze blades can be geochemically traced to a quarry on Tutuila (Samoa). Tahitians are known to have passed through Pukapuka en route to islands in Samoa and Tonga.

The original population is likely to have numbered 1000 or more, but has recovered from extremely low numbers more than once. Oral traditions refer to at least two episodes of civil war, and inundation of the atoll from a major tsunami or cyclone, in which only two women and 15 men survived.

The island was first discovered by Europeans in 1595, when the Spanish explorer Álvaro de Mendaña saw it on the feast day of Saint Bernard and named it San Bernardo. It was sighted again in 1765 by a British Naval expedition under Commodore John Byron, who named it the "Islands of Danger" because of the reefs and the high surf that made it too dangerous to land. The name "Danger Island" still appears on some maps. According to oral tradition, an unknown ship called at Pukapuka in the mid 18th century, and when the Yalongo lineage chief Tāwaki boldly took the captain's pipe out of his mouth, he was shot.

Thirty years later, Pukapuka was given the name "Isles de la Loutre" (Isles of the Otter) by Pierre François Péron, a French adventurer who was acting as first mate on board the American merchant ship Otter (Captain Ebenezer Dorr) after it was sighted on 3 April 1796. The following day, Péron, Thomas Muir of Huntershill (1765–1799), and a small party landed ashore but the inhabitants would not allow them to inspect the island. Trading later took place near the ship, when adzes, mats and other artifacts were exchanged for knives and European goods.

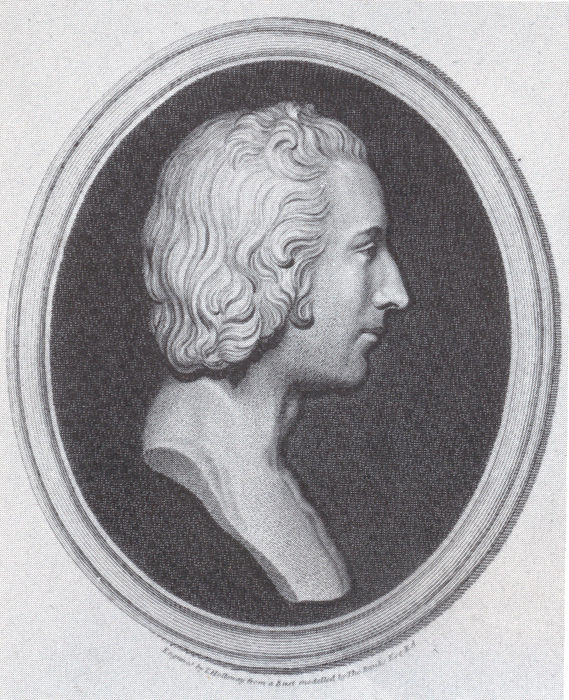
Thomas Muir

"Everything united to convince us that we had the right to attribute to ourselves the honour of having discovered three new islands; and with this conviction I gave them the name 'Isles of the Otter' ('Isles de la Loutre') which was the name of our vessel. In order to distinguish them, we named the eastern one 'Peron and Muir' [Motu Kō], the one to the north 'Dorr' [Pukapuka], and the name of 'Brown' was given to the third [Motu Kotawa], after one of our officers." Péron believed that they were the first to discover the island, mostly because the people were so afraid of them. The Pukapukans' fear of the visitors was because Tāwaki had been killed during the ship visit about 30 years previously.

Because of Pukapuka's isolation, few vessels visited before 1857 when the London Missionary Society landed teachers from Aitutaki and Rarotonga. Luka Manuae of Aitutaki later wrote an extended account of the first days of contact 5–8 December 1857: No te taeanga o te tuatua a te Atua ki Pukapuka ("The arrival of the Word of God at Pukapuka", dated August 1869). Some lineages wanted to kill the newcomers in revenge for an incident that had happened a month earlier, but Vakaawi, chief of Yālongo lineage, protected them. In the following days, the island accepted Luka's Christian message, largely because of an encounter when two dead people were apparently raised back to life.

In 1862 Rev. William Wyatt Gill found most of the people on the island converted to Christianity. A raid in 1863 by Peruvian slave traders took 145 men and women, of whom only two returned, Kolia and Pilato (Malowutia). The London Missionary Society barque John Williams was wrecked on the western side in May 1864. In 1868 the buccaneer Bully Hayes took about 40 people to go on a labour scheme, but none of them returned home.

Pukapuka was proclaimed a British protectorate in 1892 and was included in the Cook Islands boundaries under the control of New Zealand in 1901.

=== World War II ===
Three U.S. Navy fliers from the USS Enterprise arrived on Pukapuka in February 1942. Harold Dixon, Gene Aldrich, and Tony Pastula survived 34 days on the open ocean in a tiny 4 by 8 foot (1.2 by 2.4 m) raft, beginning their odyssey with no food or water stores and very few tools. They were found by Teleuka Iotua huddled in a hut belonging to Lakulaku Tutala on Loto Village's reserve, where he gave them coconuts to drink. He then went and got more help. Shortly after their arrival a cyclone struck the island and caused widespread damage. Their story was told in the book The Raft by Robert Trumbull, published by Henry Holt and Co. in 1942, and released as a motion picture Against the Sun in 2014.

Historical population
Year	Pop.	±%
1906	435	—
1916	474	+9.0%
1926	526	+11.0%
1936	651	+23.8%
1945	662	+1.7%
1951	559	−15.6%
1961	718	+28.4%
1966	684	−4.7%
1971	732	+7.0%
1976	785	+7.2%
1981	797	+1.5%
1986	761	−4.5%
1996	779	+2.4%
2001	664	−14.8%
2006	507	−23.6%
2011	451	−11.0%
2016	444	−1.6%
2021	456	+2.7%

=== Post World War II ===
Pukapuka was hit by Cyclone Percy in February 2005 — a Category Five cyclone that destroyed the taro gardens, brought down thousands of trees, and damaged three-quarters of the houses.

== Treaty ==
From 1856 to 1980, the United States claimed sovereignty over the island under the Guano Islands Act. On 11 June 1980, in connection with establishing the maritime boundary between the Cook Islands and American Samoa, the United States signed the Cook Islands – United States Maritime Boundary Treaty acknowledging that Pukapuka was under Cook Islands' sovereignty.

== Economy ==
Although the island has a well-maintained airstrip, flights from Rarotonga are very infrequent. The five-hour flight from Rarotonga via Air Rarotonga now operates when there is a Government charter once every six weeks or so. The island is closer to Samoa than to the rest of the Cook Islands and transport via Samoa is becoming a preferred option for Pukapukans visiting in organised groups (tele parties) from New Zealand and Australia.

== Culture ==
Pukapuka has its own language and customs that are different from those of the rest of the Cook Islands.

The entire population is said to be descended from seventeen men, two women and an unknown number of children who survived a catastrophic storm and tsunami in the 17th century. A new estimate of the date of the calamity based on oral histories suggests that it happened about 1590. Following blackbirding raids, by 1870 the population of the atoll was reduced to 340 people.

The island had a population of 664 at the 2001 census, but since 2005 the population has declined to less than 500.

The American writer Robert Dean Frisbie settled on Pukapuka in 1924, married a native woman, and raised his family on the island. He wrote several books about his experiences on Pukapuka and surrounding islands. He said at the time he was looking for a place beyond the reach of "the faintest echo from the noisy clamour of the civilised world". Frisbie’s daughter Johnny and her return to Pukapuka is featured in the 2021 documentary The Island in Me.

Pukapuka served as the namesake for the tribe of Asian-Americans in Survivor: Cook Islands, the 13th season of the U.S. reality show in which initial tribes were divided by race.

== See also ==
- Pukapukan language
- List of Guano Island claims
- List of reduplicated place names
