= Yato (Pukapuka) =

Cook Islands village

Coordinates: 10°51′12.56″S 165°50′49.96″W

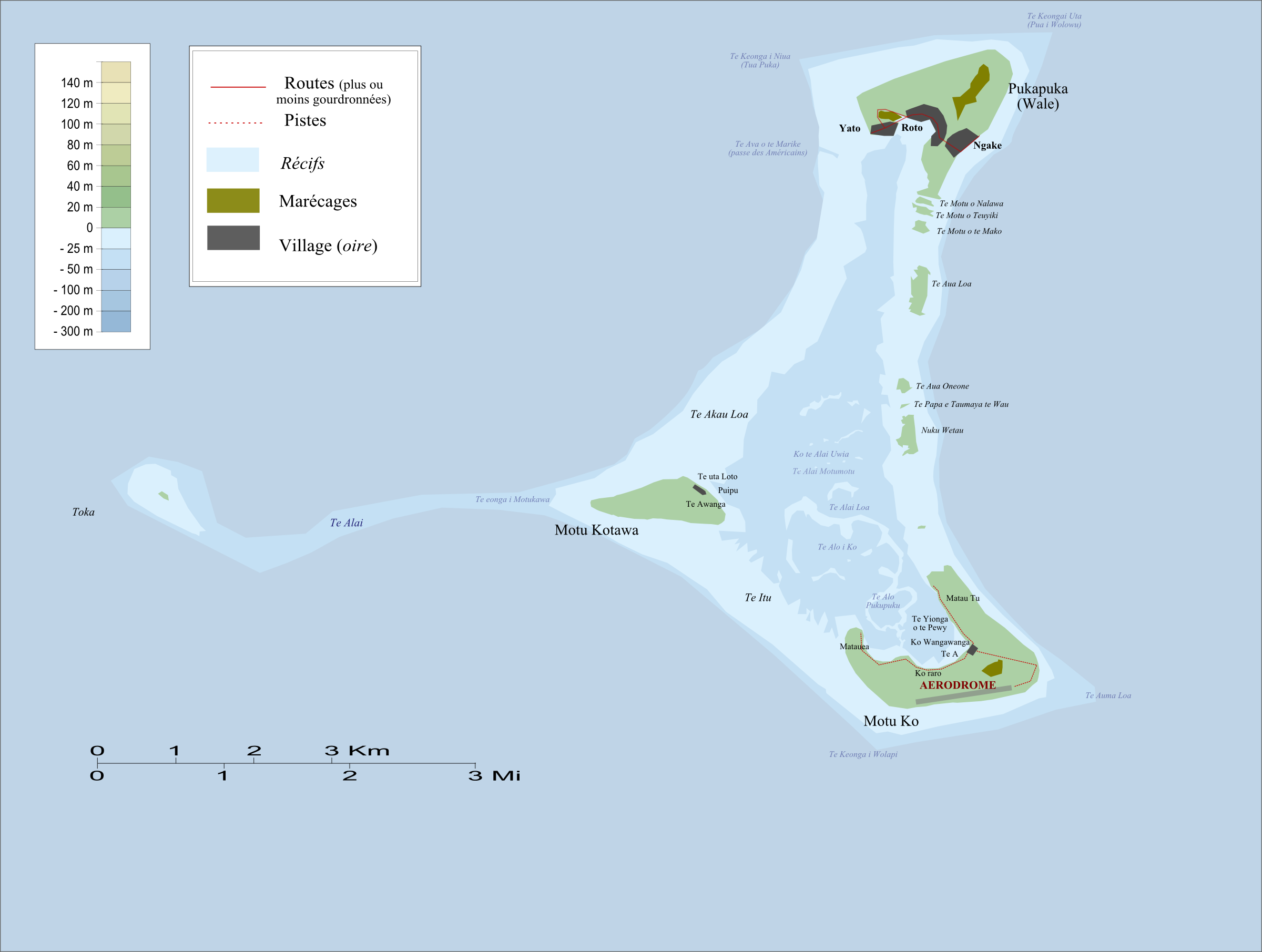
Map of Pukapuka Atoll

Yato is one of three villages on the island of Wale in the Pukapuka atoll of the Cook Islands. Yato is the westernmost village and regulates the island of Motu Kotawa and the sand cay of Toka.

Niua School is located in the village.
