= Ngake (Pukapuka) =

Village on Wale Island, Cook Islands

Coordinates: 10°51′18.92″S 165°50′20.89″W

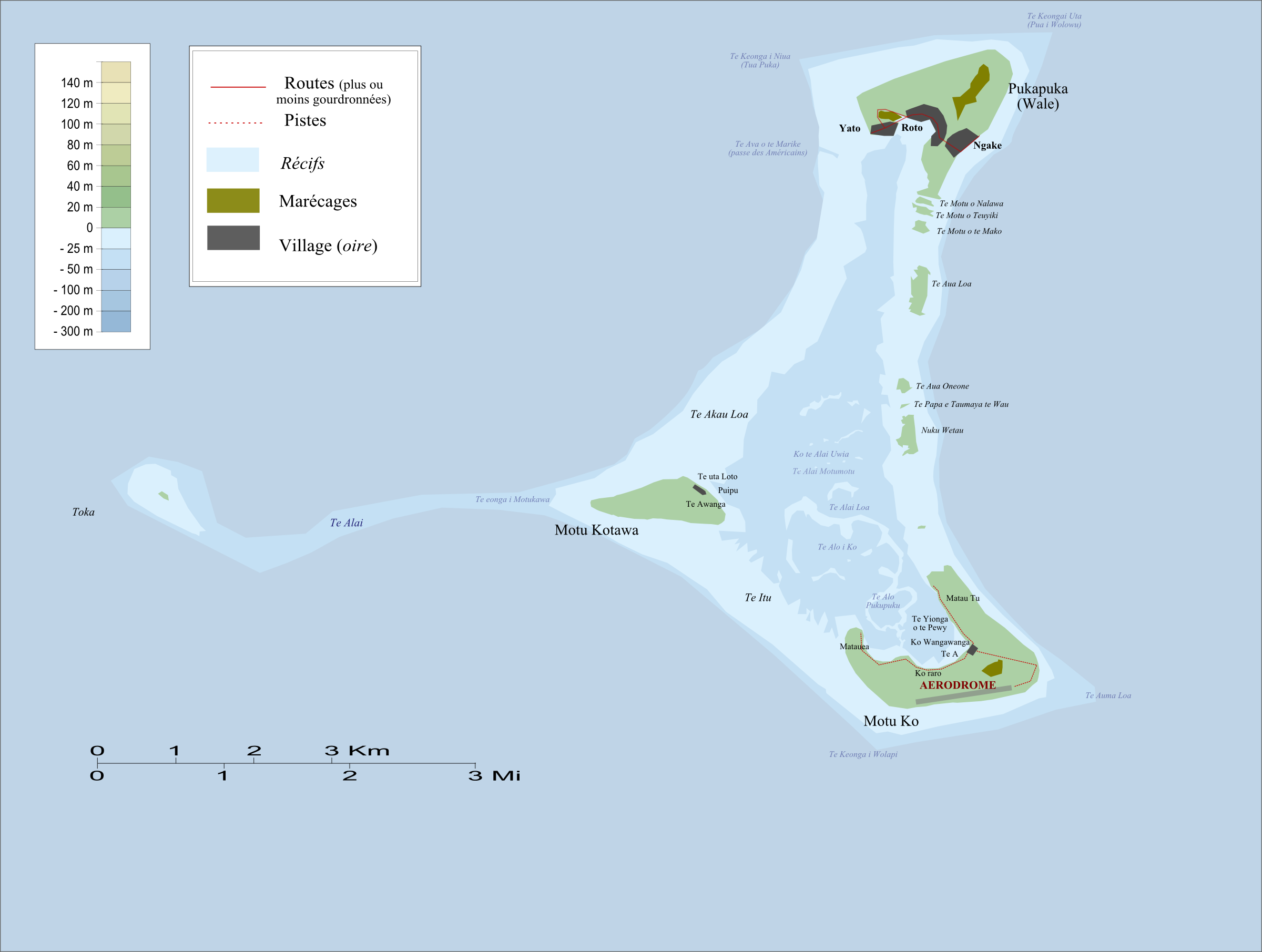
Map of Pukapuka Atoll

Ngake is one of three villages on the island of Wale in the Pukapuka atoll of the Cook Islands. It is the easternmost village and regulates the island of Motu Kō.
