= Wyoming (Clinton, Maryland) =

Historic house in Maryland, United States

- U.S. National Register of Historic Places
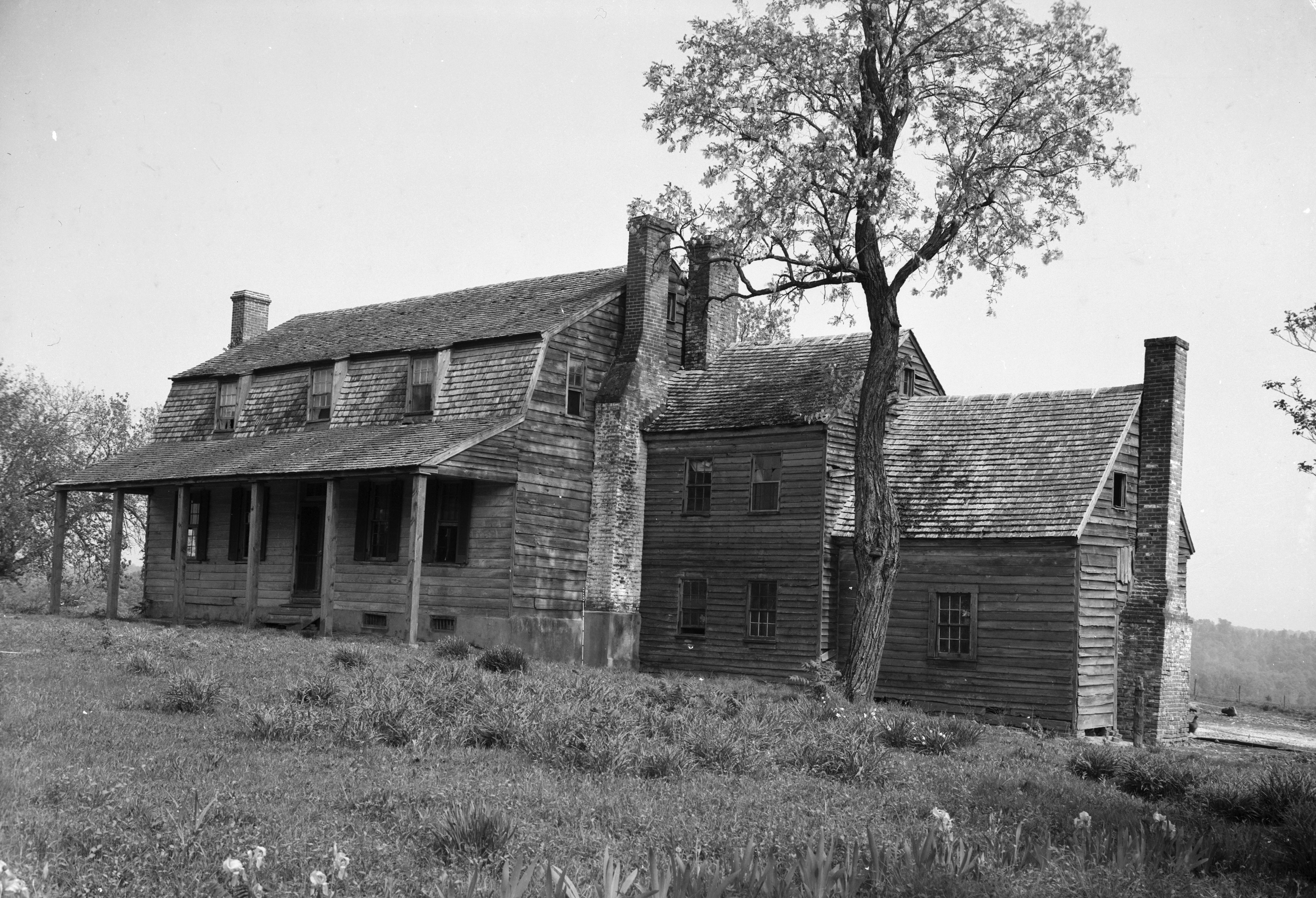
- Wyoming, May 1936

- Location within Maryland Location within the United States
- Nearest city: 11530 Thrift Road, Clinton, Maryland
- Coordinates: 38°43′38″N 76°55′9″W
- Area: 31 acres (13 ha)
- Built: 1750
- Architectural style: Federal
- NRHP reference No.: 80004330
- Added to NRHP: January 24, 1980

Wyoming is a frame historic house located in Clinton in Prince George's County, Maryland, United States. It consists of three separate and distinct sections: the main block built in the third quarter of the 18th century, a ca. 1817 kitchen, and a connecting two-bay section of c. 1850. The house is a well-preserved example of Maryland's gambrel-roofed colonial architecture, and is more specifically noteworthy as an excellent example of southern Maryland tidewater architecture. With the exception of Mt. Pleasant, the house may have the oldest boxwood in the county planted on its grounds.

Wyoming is also significant historically as the ancestral home of the Marburys, a family which produced many of Maryland's political, professional, and judicial leaders through the 18th, 19th, and 20th centuries. The house has been continuously owned by members of the family from its construction c. 1750 until 1973. A small Marbury family cemetery is located south of the main house in a grove of trees. This includes a large obelisk dedicated to Catharine Taylor Marbury, the wife of Fendall Marbury, who died in 1866. Wyoming is also notable for its great planting of boxwood, forming a walkway leading to the front of the house.

Wyoming was part of an original land grant known as Appledore, patented by Robert Middleton in 1688. Appledore is seen as #9 on the map of Tracts of the Lower Piscataway Hundred before April 23, 1696. The name "Wyoming", according to the Marbury family history, was chosen by a daughter of the family (Cora Marbury) after a favorite poem, "Gertrude of Wyoming", written by Thomas Campbell in 1809. The poem deals with a famous Indian massacre in the Wyoming Valley of Pennsylvania, and was a favorite of Cora's.

== History ==
Francis Marbury, prominent in early 18th century Maryland as a vestryman of St. John's, Broadcreek, the oldest parish in Prince George's County; a Tobacco Inspector for the Piscataway district; a Land Commissioner for Prince George's County; and Judge of Survey in Charles County, acquired the property in 1698, known as Appledore. Upon his death in 1734, his landholdings were divided between his sons, Eusebius, Leonard, Luke, and William.

Little is known about Luke Marbury (d. October, 1758) second son of Francis Marbury, other than that he held positions as an Inspector of Tobacco at Piscataway. a commissioner of the county, and Justice of the Peace. He left an only son, Luke Marbury (II), to whom his property was transferred. (Luke Marbury I is the presumed builder of Wyoming.)

Luke Marbury (II) attained real distinction during the Revolutionary War. As he came to be called, Colonel Luke Marbury served on various Committees of Observation and Correspondence. He was chosen as a delegate to the Constitutional Convention of 1775, and participated in framing Maryland's first constitution. When war appeared imminent, he was commissioned a captain of the local militia company. He fought in the Battle of Germantown, where he was captured and imprisoned. Col. Marbury was exchanged in 1781, and returned to Prince George's County where local tradition records that he was carried through the streets of Upper Marlboro on the shoulders of the crowd. He served as a member of the State Legislature until he died in 1809.

Of note, Dr. William Beanes, Colonel Luke Marbury's brother-in-law, was taken prisoner shortly after the successful British assault on Washington, D.C., in August 1814. Francis Scott Key, a friend of Beanes, went on board the British ship in the Chesapeake Bay where Beanes was being held in an effort to secure his release. It is from this vantage point that Key witnessed the bombardment of Fort McHenry on the night of September 13–14, 1814, that inspired him to write the "Star-Spangled Banner."

Col. Marbury's eldest son, who was known as Captain William Marbury because of his service in the War of 1812, served in a number of positions of Legislature from 1798 to 1800, and was elected several times as Clerk of the County Court. Shortly after his marriage to Susan Fendall, his health began to fail and he died of tuberculosis at the age of 34.

William Luke Marbury, eldest son of Capt. William Marbury, inherited Wyoming at his father's death. He devoted himself to agriculture and care of the family's large landholdings. It is his daughter, Cora who is credited with the creation of the name Wyoming for the family home. William Luke Marbury died about 1836, and his widow, Susan Fitzhugh Fendall Marbury, who died August 25, 1871, are both buried in the family graveyard on this property (graves unmarked according to current owners).

Susan Marbury transferred title of the Wyoming property to her son, Fendall on March 31, 1860. Fendall Marbury studied law at St. John's College in Annapolis and practiced in Alexandria, Virginia. He married, Catherine Taylor Marshall great-niece of Chief Justice John Marshall, on October 6, 1857, and they moved to Wyoming and made it their home. Fendall, like other Marburys, held many positions of responsibility, including member of the State Legislature, one of the State Presidential Electors, and a vestryman of St. Thomas parish. Until 1973 Wyoming was transferred from member to member of the Marbury family.

Wyoming was listed on the National Register of Historic Places in 1980.

== Wyoming Farm ==
Wyoming Farm is a young chestnut and pawpaw orchard that started in 2016 on the grounds at Wyoming. The orchard produces pawpaws and chestnuts, and serves the Clinton and Washington, DC community by using "Pick Your Own" methods. Tourism opportunities exist in historical tours, permaculture workshops, and private events.
