= Against the Sun =

2014 film by Brian Falk

- Theatrical release poster
- Directed by: Brian Falk
- Written by: Brian Falk; Mark David Keegan
- Produced by: Brian Falk; Kurt Graver; Mark Moran
- Starring: Garret Dillahunt; Tom Felton; Jake Abel
- Cinematography: Petr Cikhart
- Edited by: Sean Albertson
- Music by: Paul Mills
- Production company: American Film Company
- Distributed by: Goldcrest Films NYC
- Release dates: November 22, 2014 (New Orleans premiere); January 23, 2015
- Running time: 99 minutes
- Country: United States
- Language: English
- Box office: $4,646

Against the Sun is a 2014 American survival drama film. Based on a true story from World War II, the film was written, produced, and directed by Brian Falk and starred Garret Dillahunt, Tom Felton, and Jake Abel. The film was released via video on demand on January 23, 2015.

== Plot ==
On January 16, 1942, US Navy airmen pilot Harold Dixon, bombardier Tony Pastula and radioman Gene Aldrich, flying a Douglas TBD Devastator torpedo bomber from the aircraft carrier USS Enterprise, encounter problems on a patrol mission over the South Pacific. Separated from other aircraft on the mission and unable to get their bearings, Dixon makes a decision to head back to the carrier.

Radioman Aldrich announces they are out of range of reception. Running low on fuel and unsure of their exact location, Dixon orders his crew to prepare for the ditching and to assemble their survival gear. After making a successful ditching, the survivors find themselves on a tiny life raft, surrounded by open ocean. Even seeing a dive bomber from their carrier searching for them, they realize that the search is too far away from their position, and the rescue effort will soon move away from them. Dixon describes their predicament as "lost at sea", the naval term for giving up the search.

With Dixon taking charge, an inventory of their survival gear is made. They realize there are no oars, or map, and more importantly, no food or water. With little hope of rescue, they drift across the ocean. Aldrich is eventually able to kill a shark after it attacks their makeshift fishing rod, which they then eat to stave off starvation, and rainfall initially prevents dehydration, though rations for both dwindle and the three are forced to drink their own urine. Aldrich's hand is bitten by a shark, and Dixon is almost eaten after retrieving a bird that Aldrich had shot.

Tensions rise and Aldrich turns on Dixon prompting the latter to reveal that he fell asleep prior to their having to ditch the plane, and is the reason that they became lost in the first place. Despite this, both men are able to partially forgive Dixon after he uses their shoes as makeshift oars. Suffering from starvation and lacking food, they are forced to eat their hair as well as their lice. The three then suffer severe skin trauma due to scratching and sun blister. They begin to row and agree that whoever spots land first is owed a meal by the other two, "anything he wants, anywhere he wants". Despite this optimism, a storm hits the raft and Tony is nearly lost, though all three survive now with no supplies. At their lowest point and nearly dead, the trio spot land and wash up on the shore of an island, Pukapuka.

Credits reveal they spent 34 days at sea, having drifted for over 1000 miles. Dixon was awarded the Navy Cross and never flew again. Tony was unable to continue with the Navy though his ashes were scattered at sea upon his death in 1986. Aldrich continued as a radioman and married Tony's sister, Frances, in 1946.

== Cast ==
- Garret Dillahunt as pilot Harold Dixon
- Tom Felton as bombardier Tony Pastula
- Jake Abel as radioman Gene Aldrich
- Nadia Parra as Frances (Tony's sister)
- Quinton Flynn as Newsreel narrator

== Production ==
Principal photography on Against the Sun started in 2014 with location work at El Rosario, Sinaloa, Mexico. The cast underwent a strict diet of 500 calories daily to show the emaciated state of the survivors. As they lost weight, the actors more accurately depicted the stages of starvation that took place over 34 days stranded on the ocean.

== Release ==
Against the Sun had a premiere at the National World War II Museum in New Orleans, Louisiana on November 23, 2014. The film was released to video on demand on January 23, 2015. Against the Sun also played at the Arena Theater in Los Angeles.

== Reception ==
Against the Sun received mixed reviews from critics. Review aggregation website Rotten Tomatoes gives the film a score of 67% based on 9 reviews, with an average rating of 6.4/10. On Metacritic, the film had a score of 43 out of 100, based on 5 reviews.

The Los Angeles Times said Against the Sun was admirable but compared it unfavorably to Angelina Jolie's film Unbroken (2014) which had been released a month before.

== Historical background ==
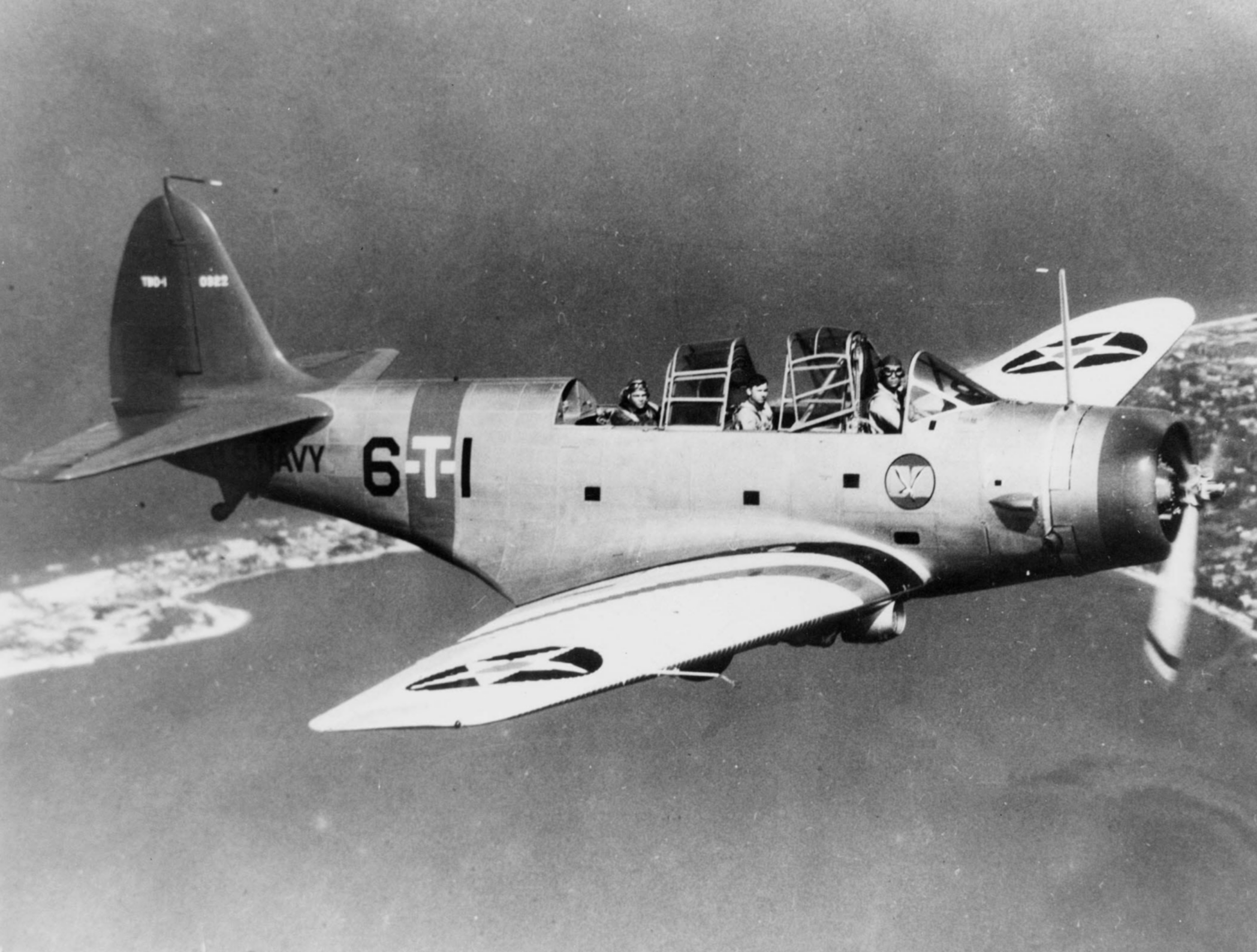
Douglas TBD Devastator torpedo bomber from VT-6 before World War II, similar to the aircraft Dixon flew.

On January 16, 1942, Chief Aviation Machinist's Mate and enlisted Naval pilot Harold Dixon (aged 41, from La Mesa, California), radioman Gene Aldrich (aged 22 from Sikeston, Missouri) and bombardier Anthony Pastula (aged 24 of Youngstown, Ohio) took off from the aircraft carrier USS Enterprise in a Douglas TBD Devastator torpedo bomber Bureau Number 0335. As part of Torpedo Squadron SIX (VT-6), they were to undertake an anti-submarine sweep over the Pacific Ocean. Once airborne, they were to maintain radio silence to safeguard the carrier from being detected by the Japanese.

Their aircraft lost position and was unable to return to the carrier. Running low on fuel, Dixon ditched the aircraft in the ocean. The aircraft sank quickly taking most of the crew's survival equipment with it. The men inflated the small rubber life raft and climbed inside. Surviving on rainwater and rations, the men drifted for 34 days and travelled over 1,000 miles, before landing on the Pukapuka atoll, a friendly island. The crew was picked up a week later by a seaplane from the USS Swan.

For his efforts to keep his crew alive Dixon was awarded the Navy Cross. The citation read "...for extreme heroism, exceptional determination, resourcefulness, skilled seamanship, excellent judgment and highest quality of leadership". Both Pastula and Aldrich received presidential commendations for their "extraordinary courage, fortitude, strength of character and exceptional endurance".

The emergency life raft along with the crew was washed ashore on Pukapuka atoll and later sent to Pearl Harbor. After the war, the raft was repaired and on display at the United States Naval Academy Museum for the remainder of the war. Currently on display at the National Naval Aviation Museum, the raft is displayed with a cut-out of the crew in the exhibit "Raft: A story of survival at sea".
