= Toka (Pukapuka) =

Island of the Cook Islands

Coordinates: 10°53′32.49″S 165°55′27.76″W

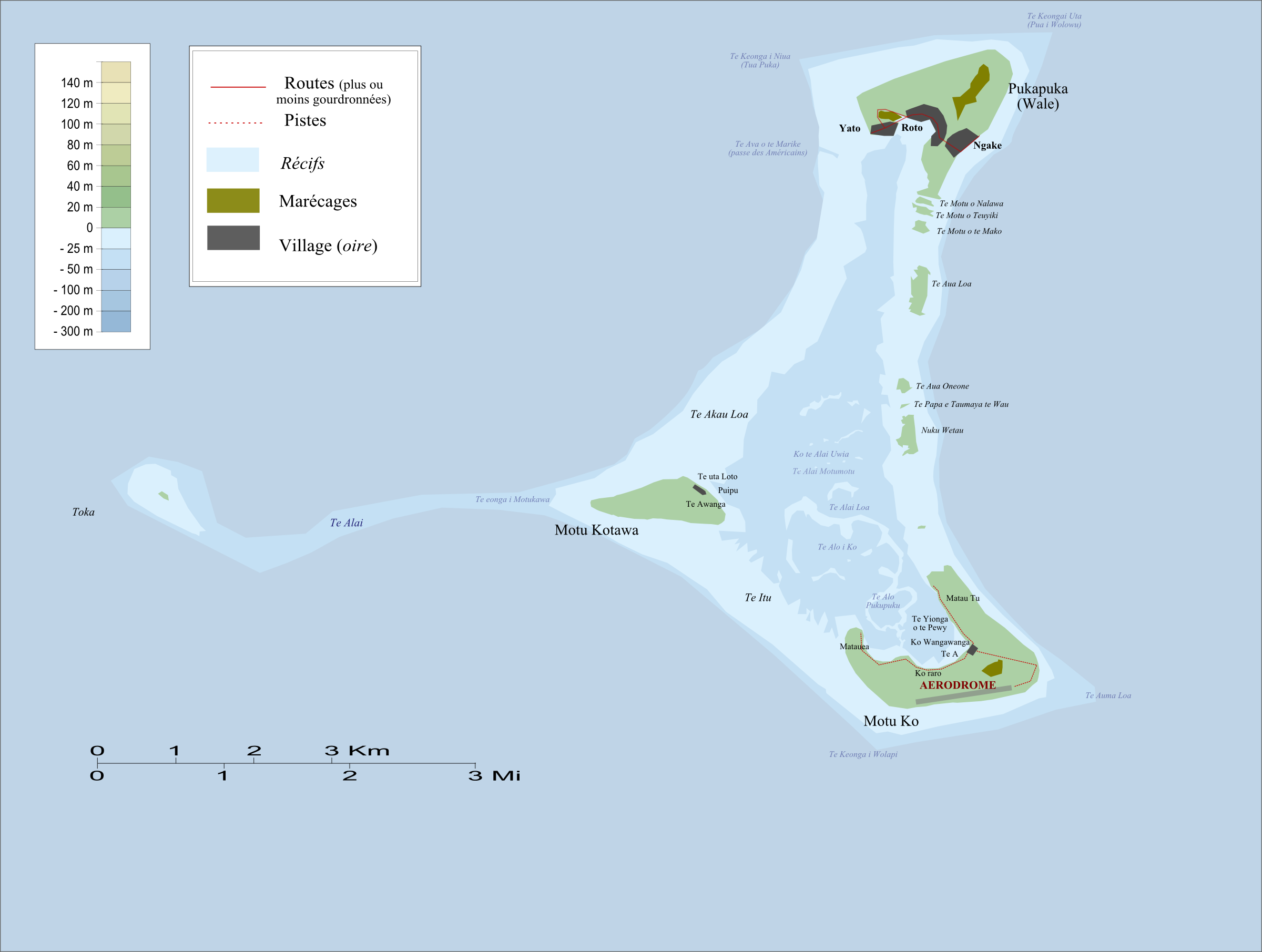
Map of Pukapuka Atoll

Toka is a sand cay in the Pukapuka atoll of the Cook Islands. The cay is to the west of the atoll, separated from the island of Motu Kotawa by a reef. It is regulated by the village of Yato, and is extremely dangerous to land on.
