= Motu Kotawa =

Coordinates: 10°53′35.83″S 165°52′17.41″W

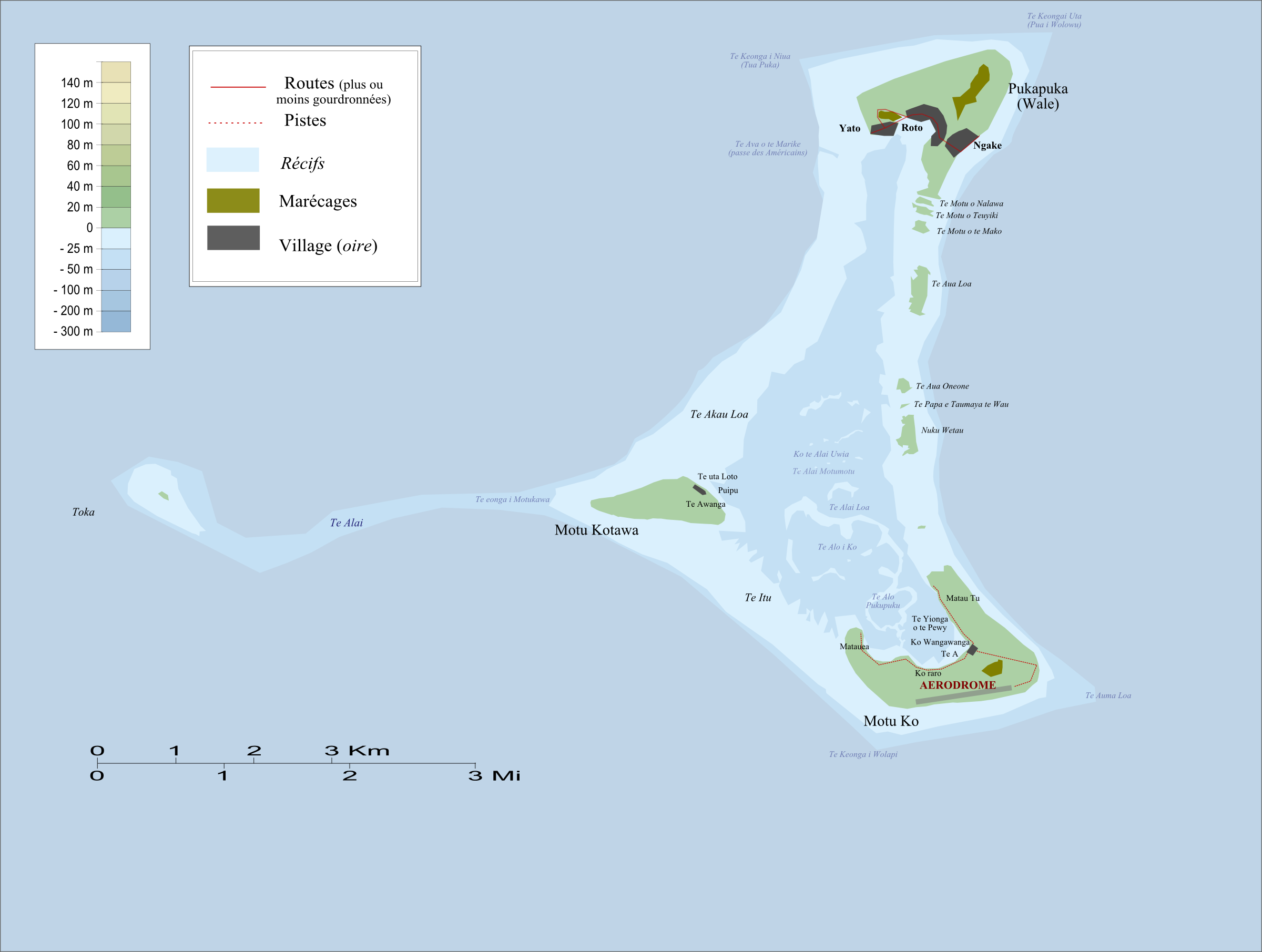
Map of Pukapuka Atoll

Motu Kotawa is one of three islands in the Pukapuka atoll of the Cook Islands. It forms the western apex of Pukapuka's triangular atoll, and is the smallest of the three islands. The island is low-lying, with a maximum elevation of 3 meters above sea level. The island is uninhabited and used as a food source. It is home to numerous Frigatebirds, as well as plantations of taro, papaya, breadfruit, coconuts and bananas, and is regulated by the village of Yato. A reef extends from the west of the island, connecting it to the islet of Toka.
