= Jason Hatfield =

American actor and voice actor

Jason Hatfield is an American actor and voice actor. He has voiced characters in anime series such as Blue Submarine No.6 (1999), Voogie's Angel (2000), and the television series You're Under Arrest! (2002–2003). He has also had roles in the films The Conspirator (2010), Little Red Wagon (2012), and the role of "Pittman" in the Showtime series Homeland (2011).

In February of 2026, Hatfield launched a podcast called, "This Famous Vendetta", a history podcast hosted by Hatfield that re-examines the myths, historical narratives, and personal realities behind the Hatfield-McCoy conflict, alongside broader threads in American history. In October, 2026, it was listed as "one of the 16 best feud podcasts to listen to in 2026."

== Personal life ==
Hatfield is also a direct descendant from the Hatfield–McCoy feud, being the great-great-grandson of Valentine "Uncle Wall" Hatfield, "Devil Anse" Hatfield’s oldest brother.

Born in Atlanta, Georgia, Hatfield has one older sibling. He currently resides in Durham, North Carolina working as a middle school social studies teacher.
