= James O. Hall =

American historian (1912–2007)

James Otis Hall
- Born: June 30, 1912
- Died: February 26, 2007 (aged 94)

James Otis Hall (June 30, 1912 – February 26, 2007) was an amateur historian who specialized in the assassination of Abraham Lincoln. He was widely regarded as one of the top experts on this matter, and is noted for having discovered a letter by John Wilkes Booth, written on the morning of the murder, in which Booth attempted to justify his actions. He also argued that Samuel Mudd was guilty of helping Booth.

His books include Come Retribution by William A. Tidwell, James O. Hall and David W. Gaddy; On the Way to Garrett's Barn—John Wilkes Booth & David E. Herold in the Northern Neck of Virginia, April 22–26, 1865; and The Surratt Family and John Wilkes Booth.

Hall served in the U.S. Army as first lieutenant during World War II, then worked for the Department of Labor. He was widowed and living in McLean, VA at his death. His Lincoln research files form the cornerstone of the James O. Hall Research Center at the Surratt House Museum.
