= Loto (Pukapuka) =

Village on Wale Island, Cook Islands

Coordinates: 10°51′7.05″S 165°50′32.36″W

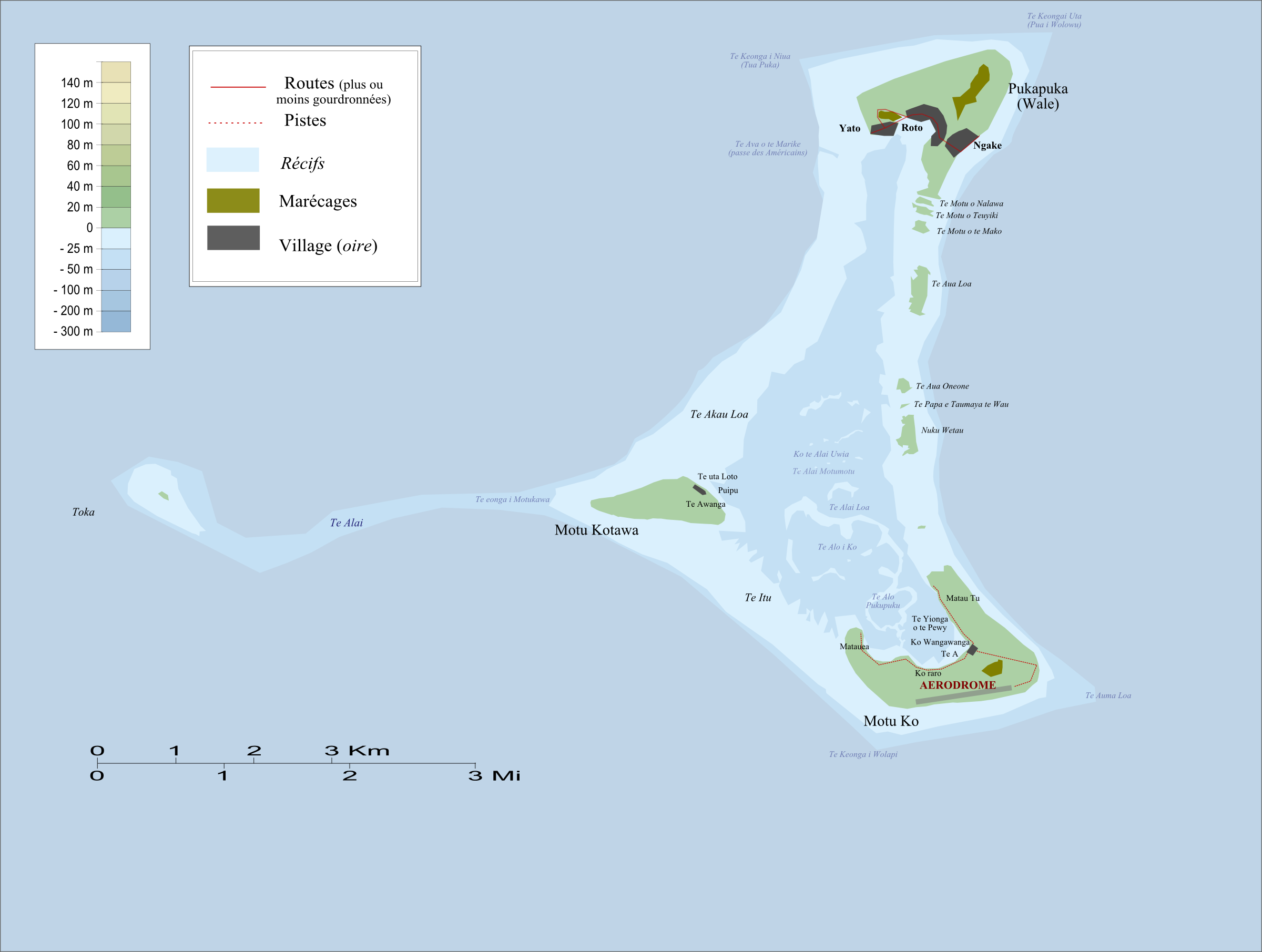
Map of Pukapuka Atoll

Loto is one of three villages on the island of Wale in the Pukapuka atoll of the Cook Islands. It is the central village and regulates Motu Uta, the major food-production area on Wale.
