= American Film Company (2008) =

The American Film Company
- Founded: 2008
- Area served: Worldwide
- Key people: Joe Ricketts (CEO); Alfed Levitt (COO); Brian Falk (Producer/Executive); Robert Stone (Producer/Executive)
- Website: The American Film Company

The American Film Company is a film production company founded in 2008 by Joe Ricketts. Ricketts previously founded TD Ameritrade and, with his family, owns the Chicago Cubs. The American Film Company, founded on the belief that real life is often more compelling than fiction, produces feature films about true stories from America's past. The company has offices in New York City and Los Angeles.

== Films ==
The company's first film was The Conspirator, a historical drama about the trial of Mary Surratt, the lone woman charged as a co-conspirator in the Abraham Lincoln assassination. The film was directed by Robert Redford and stars James McAvoy and Robin Wright. In keeping with the company's goal to create historically accurate films, Pulitzer Prize winner James McPherson, Lincoln assassination expert Thomas Turner, and Army historian Col. Fred Borch consulted on the film.

The American Film Company is currently developing The Arsenal, a film about John Brown's raid on Harpers Ferry, and Midnight Riders, about the midnight ride of Paul Revere.

=== List of films ===
- The Conspirator (2010)
- Parkland (2013)
- Against the Sun (2014)
- Born in the Badlands
- The Arsenal
- The Third Wave
