= Wale (Pukapuka) =

Island in Pukapuka

Coordinates: 10°50′58.63″S 165°50′24.17″W

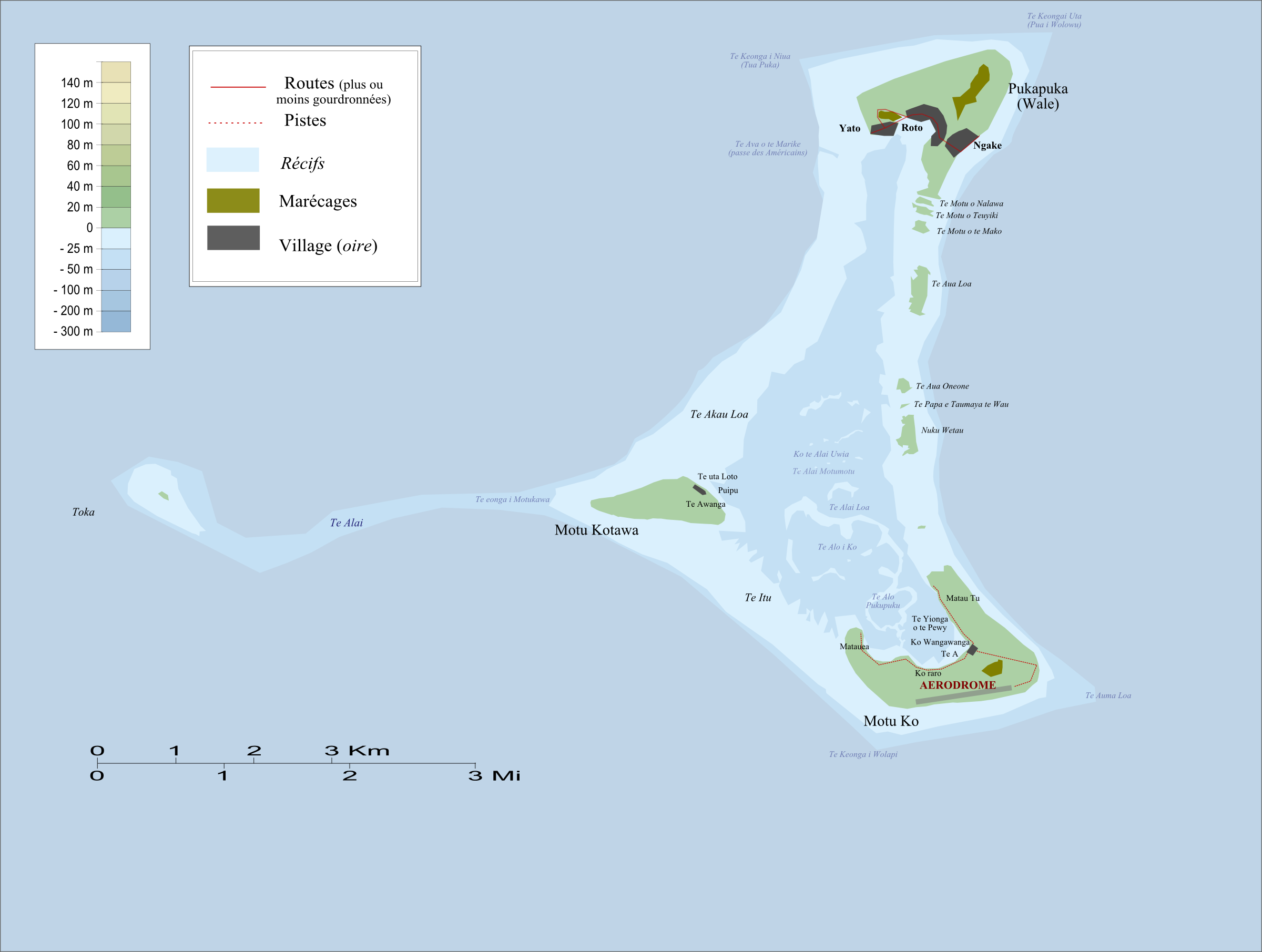
Map of Pukapuka Atoll

Wale ("house") is one of three islands in the Pukapuka atoll of the Cook Islands. It forms the northern apex of Pukapuka's triangular atoll, and is the only permanently inhabited island. The island is low-lying, with a maximum elevation of 4 meters above sea level. The three villages of Yato, Loto, and Ngake are located on the island, and regulate the other two islands as food sources.

Niua School is located on Wale.
