= Mary E. Surratt Boarding House =

Historic house in Washington, D.C., United States

- U.S. National Register of Historic Places
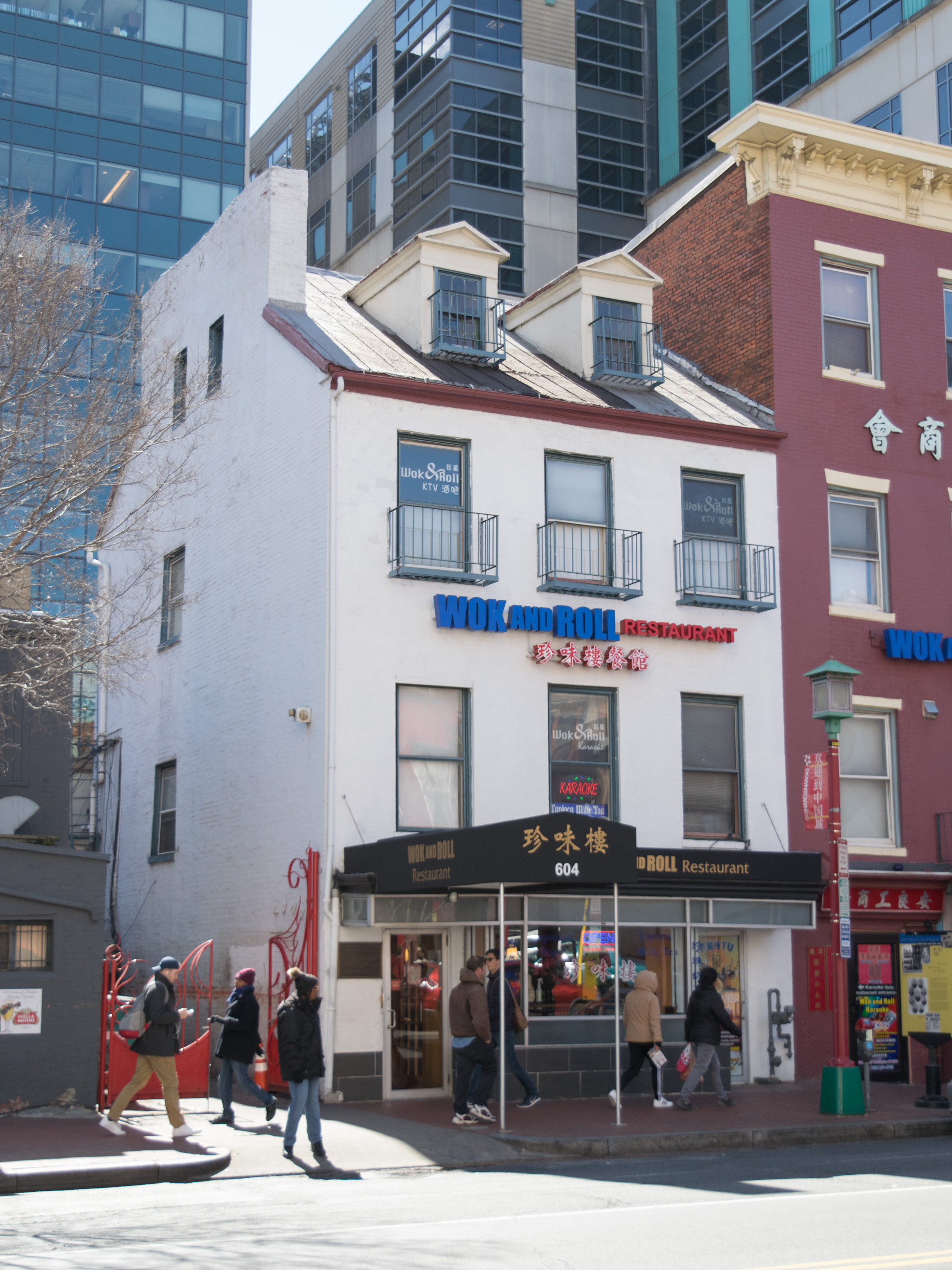

- Location within Central Washington, D.C. Location within Washington, D.C. Location within the United States
- Location: 604 H Street, N.W. Washington, D.C., U.S.
- Coordinates: 38°53′59.32″N 77°1′13.34″W
- Area: 2900 sq ft (268 sq m)
- Built: 1843; 183 years ago
- Architectural style: Early Republic, Federal
- NRHP reference No.: 04000118
- Added to NRHP: August 11, 2009

The Mary E. Surratt Boarding House in Washington, D.C. was the site of meetings of conspirators to kidnap and subsequently to assassinate U.S. President Abraham Lincoln. It was operated as a boarding house by Mary Surratt from September 1864 to April 1865.

== About the house ==
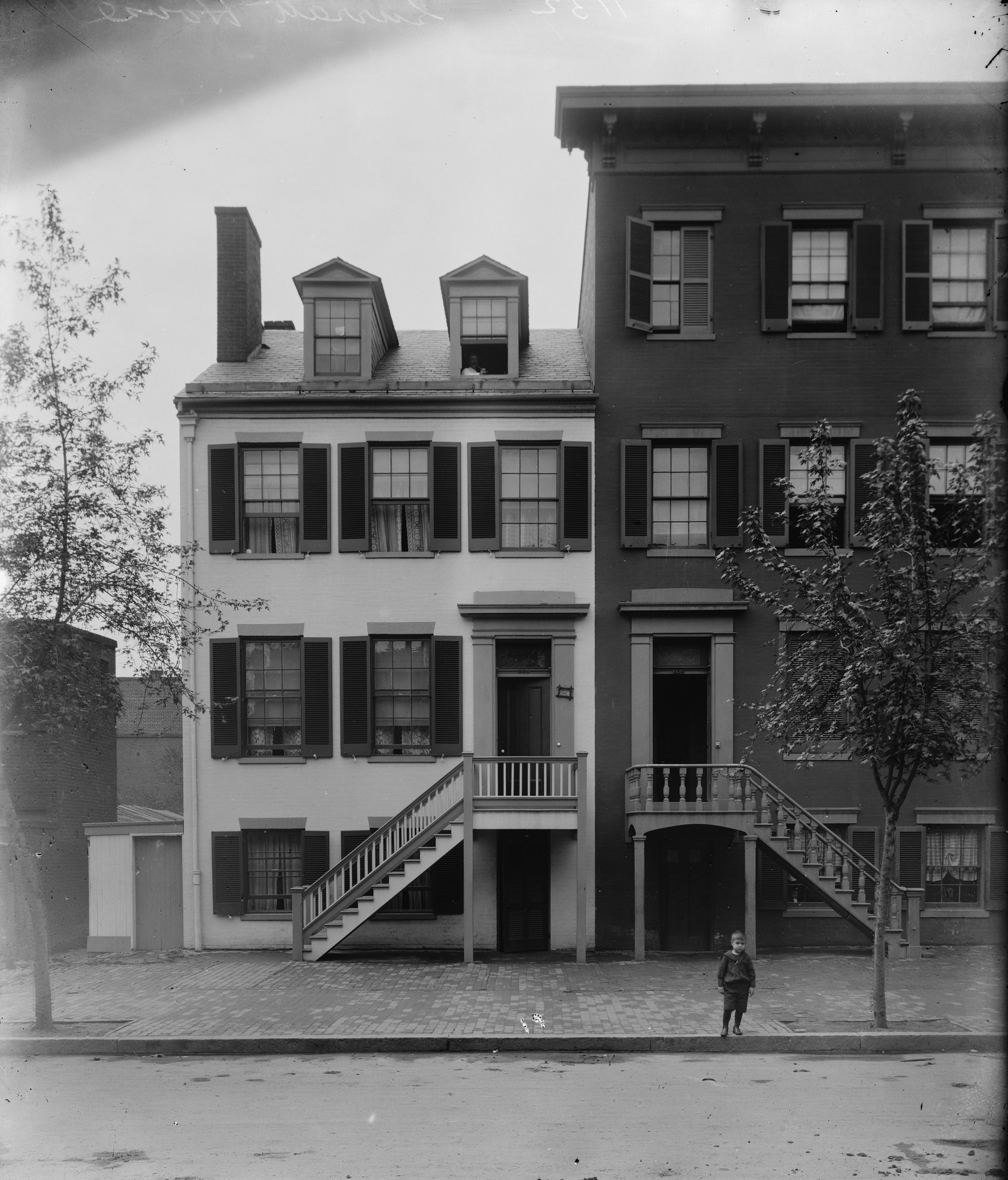
The building in 1890

The building, at 604 H Street NW, standing three-and-one-half stories tall, was constructed by Jonathan T. Walker in 1843. It has been described as being in the Early Republic or Federal style or in the "vernacular Greek Revival" style. It stands on a lot measuring 29 by 100 feet (8.8 m × 30.5 m). The building is 23 feet (7.0 m) wide, facing directly onto the sidewalk on the south side of the street, and has a depth of 36 feet (11 m). The building was altered in 1925 to use the first floor as a commercial space.

John Surratt purchased the house from Augustus A. Gibson on December 6, 1853, and operated it as a boarding house. After her husband died in 1862, Mary Surratt chose to rent her tavern/residence in nearby Surrattsville, Maryland, to John M. Lloyd, a former Washington, D.C., policeman and Confederate sympathizer, and moved into the Washington boarding house.

In 1865, the military tribunal trying the conspirators of Lincoln's assassination heard testimony from residents at the boarding house that Surratt had regularly met with John Wilkes Booth and the Lincoln conspirators at the house. Lloyd told the tribunal that Surratt had told him to provide field glasses and guns to Booth and co-conspirator David Herold. It was based on this evidence that Surratt was convicted and sentenced to death. For her role as a member of the Abraham Lincoln assassination conspiracy plot, she became the first woman to be executed by the United States federal government. She was executed by hanging.

The building, now in the center of the Chinatown of Washington D.C., was listed on the U.S. National Register of Historic Places on August 11, 2009. The listing was announced as the featured listing in the National Park Service's weekly list of August 28, 2009.

In April, 2011 the house gained some attention with the release of a film about Mary Surratt, The Conspirator by director Robert Redford. As of 2024, the commercial space is used as a restaurant, with karaoke rooms available.

== See also ==
- National Register of Historic Places listings in the District of Columbia

== Bibliography ==
- Kauffman, Michael W. American Brutus. New York: Random House, 2004.
