= Surratt House Museum =

Historic house in Maryland, United States

- Surratt House
- U.S. National Register of Historic Places
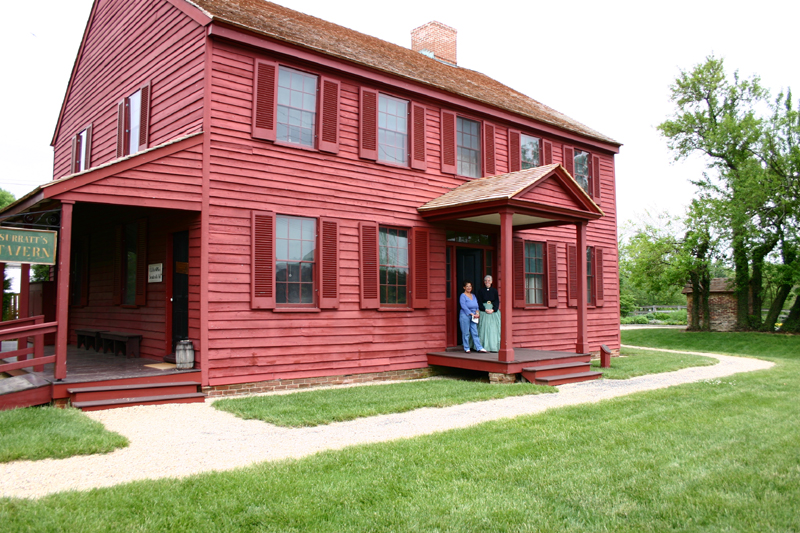
- Surratt House, Clinton, Maryland

- Location within Maryland Location within the United States
- Location: 9110 Brandywine Road, Clinton, Maryland, U.S.
- Coordinates: 38°45′53″N 76°53′52″W
- Area: 2 acres (0.81 ha)
- Architectural style: Federal
- NRHP reference No.: 73002164
- Added to NRHP: March 30, 1973

The Surratt House (also known as the Mary Surratt House and the Surratt House Museum) is a historic house and house museum located at 9110 Brandywine Road in Clinton (formerly Surrattsville), Prince George's County, Maryland, United States. The house is named for John and Mary Surratt, who built it in 1852. Mary Surratt was hanged in 1865 for being a co-conspirator in the Abraham Lincoln assassination. It was acquired by the Maryland-National Capital Park and Planning Commission (M-NCPPC) in 1965, restored, and opened to the public as a museum in 1976.

== Construction of the house ==
The original structure was built as a middle-class plantation house in 1852. Mary Jenkins met John Harrison Surratt in 1839, when she was 16 or 19 years of age (the date of her birth is not clear) and he was 26. An orphan, John Surratt was adopted by Richard and Sarah Neale of Washington, D.C., a wealthy couple who owned a farm. Jenkins and Surratt wed in August 1840. The Surratts lived at a mill in Oxon Hill, Maryland, and later at John's childhood home on a farm in the District of Columbia. In 1851, the farmhouse burned to the ground (an escaped family slave was suspected of setting the blaze). Within a year, John Surratt purchased 200 acres (81 ha) of farmland near what is now Clinton, and by 1853 he constructed a tavern and an inn there. Mary initially refused to move herself and the children into the new residence (possibly because of her husband's drinking). She took up residence at the farm again, but John sold both the Neale farm and Foxhall in May 1853 to pay debts and she was forced to move back in with him in December. The area round the tavern was officially named Surrattsville in 1853. Within a short period of time, a post office was installed inside the tavern. John Surratt was the hamlet's first postmaster. In 1854, John built a hotel as an addition to his tavern, and called it Surratt's Hotel. Over the next few years, Surratt acquired or built a carriage house, corn crib, general store, forge, granary, gristmill, stable, tobacco curing house, and wheelwright's shop.

=== House's role in the assassination of Abraham Lincoln ===
John Surratt collapsed suddenly and died on either August 25 or August 26 in 1862 (sources differ as to the date). The cause of death was a stroke. Mary Surratt struggled with running the farm, tavern, and other businesses without the help of her son, John Surratt Jr. In the fall of 1864, she began considering moving to her townhouse at 541 H Street in Washington, D.C. which her husband had obtained on December 6, 1853. On October 1, 1864, Mary Surratt took possession of the D.C. townhouse.

As part of a plot to kidnap President Abraham Lincoln in March 1865, John Surratt Jr.; his friend, George Atzerodt; and co-conspirator David Herold hid two Spencer carbines, ammunition, and some other supplies at the Surratt tavern in Surrattsville. On April 11, Mary Surratt rented a carriage and drove to her Maryland tavern. She said she made the trip to collect a debt owed her by a former neighbor. But according to her tenant, John Lloyd, Surratt told him to get the "shooting irons" ready to be picked up. On April 14, Mary Surratt said she would once again visit the family tavern in Surrattsville to collect a debt. Shortly before she left the city, John Wilkes Booth visited the Surratt townhouse and spoke privately with her. He gave her a package (later found to contain binoculars) to give to Lloyd for pick-up later that evening. Surratt delivered the package that afternoon, and (according to Lloyd) again told Lloyd to have the "shooting irons" ready for pick-up.

Booth and Herold stopped at the Surratt house briefly, picking up the rifles and binoculars, on their flight out of the District of Columbia after assassinating Lincoln.

Surratt was sentenced to death on June 30, 1865, for being a co-conspirator in the plot to assassinate Abraham Lincoln. She was hanged on July 7, 1865, at about 1:31 P.M.

== About the house ==
It is a two-story, 19th-century wood-frame structure. It is a 40-by-32-foot (12.2 by 9.8 m) rectangular building with a gable roof. There are five windows on both floors in the western face of the house. A small porch with a gabled roof protects the front door. The rear (eastern side) of the house mirrors that of the front (western side). The interior of the house features a fireplace and chimney on the north and south ends of the building. A single stairway lead from the first to the second floor. The exterior of the house is clapboard, and on the north side of the house is a verandah with a shed roof that extends the width of the house.

The Surratts built a 1 1/2-story addition against the south end of the building some time between 1853 and 1864. Roughly 16 by 16 feet (4.9 by 4.9 m) square, it featured an entrance in the southeast corner (facing east) next to a window, an interior chimney on the south side, two windows in the west face, and a root cellar door set low and at a 45-degree angle from the ground. This structure did not survive, and was rebuilt in the 1980s as part of a restoration of the house to its 1865 condition. The rebuilt addition features an exterior chimney, however.

Between 1865 and 1965, previous owners had extended the north porch so that it wrapped completely around the western facade of the house. Another owner in the early 20th century removed the porch on the eastern side of the structure and replaced it with a two-story rain porch.

== Museum ==
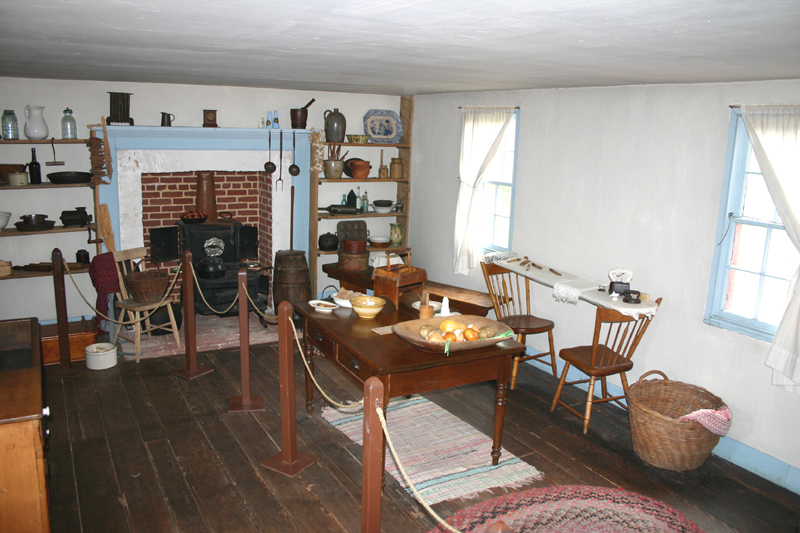
Kitchen of the Surratt House.

The house was confiscated by the federal government after Mary Surratt's conviction. It was later sold, and was privately owned until 1965. In 1939, when owned by Mrs. Ella Curtin, the structure suffered light damage in a fire.

On February 24, 1965, the Surratt House was donated to the Maryland-National Capital Park and Planning Commission (M-NCPPC) by B. K. Miller, a longtime Clinton merchant, and his son, Thomas V. Miller. The plan at the time was to move the house to the Clinton Regional Park (now Louise F. Cosca Regional Park), but that did not happen. In 1968, the M-NCPPC paid roughly $76,000 to purchase a 1 acre (0.40 ha) plot of land beneath the house. The following year, the United States Department of Housing and Urban Development provided the M-NCPPC a $38,115 grant to help pay for the land purchase.

The Surratt House was listed on the National Register of Historic Places in 1973. The house was restored by the M-NCPPC, and the restoration completed on October 2, 1975.

Citizens interested in Mary Surratt formed the Surratt Society in 1975. The Surrattsville tavern and house are a historical site run today by the Surratt Society. It is devoted to mid-19th century Maryland life and the Abraham Lincoln assassination, especially to conspiracy theories surrounding the Lincoln assassination which tend to exonerate Mrs. Surratt. The house consists of period furniture, none of which belonged to the Surratts, except for a writing desk owned by Mary. The James O. Hall Research Center is located there.

A modern private home next to the Surratt House was acquired by the M-NCPCC, and serves as a gift shop, research center, and offices.

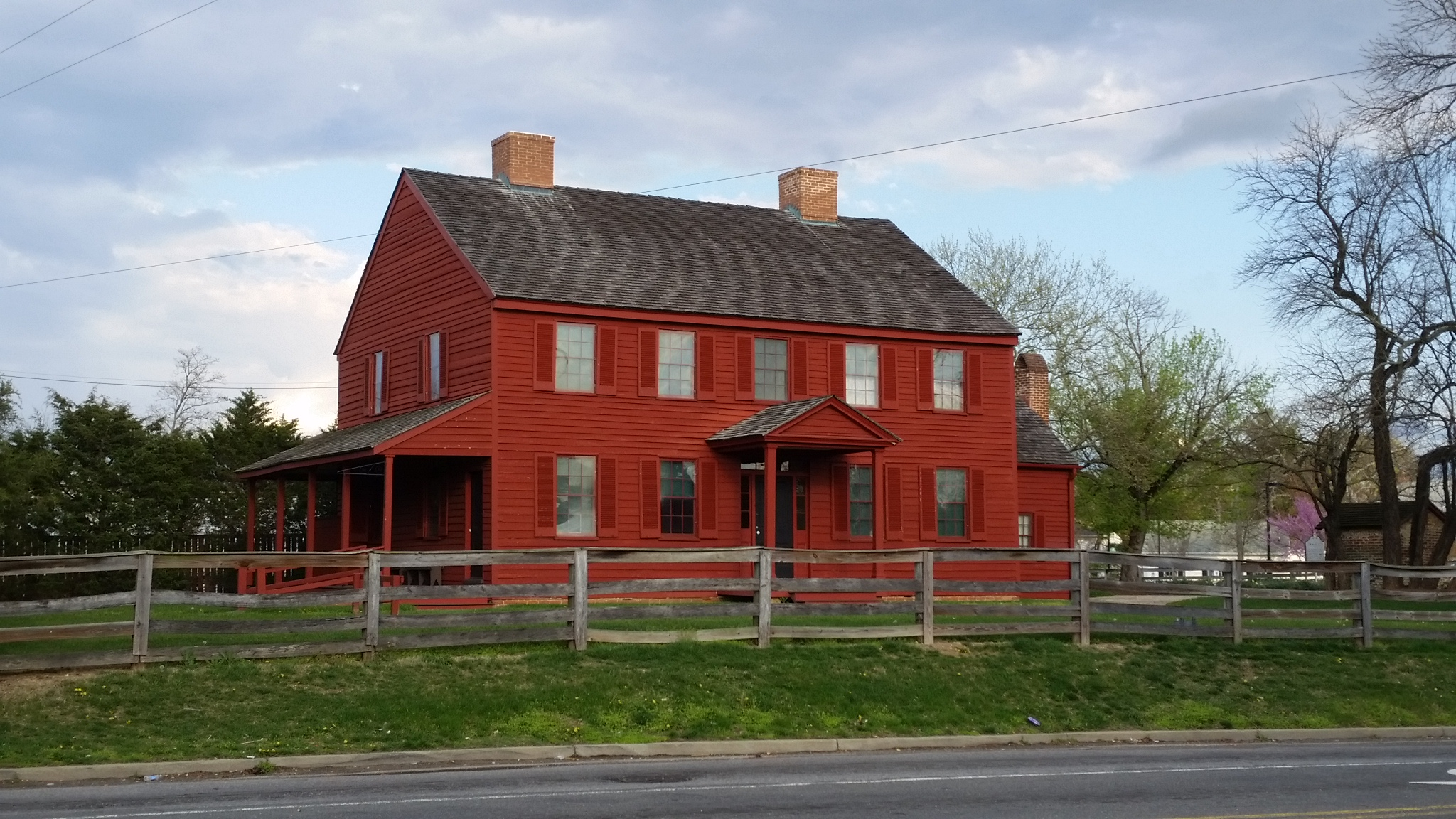
Surratt House Museum - April 2016

== See also ==
- Mary E. Surratt Boarding House
- St. Catharine (Waldorf, Maryland), home of conspirator Dr. Samuel Mudd

== Bibliography ==
- Busch, Francis X. Enemies of the state: An Account of the Trials of the Mary Eugenia Surrat Case, the Teapot Dome Cases, the Alphonse Capone Case and the Rosenburg Case. Indianapolis: Bobbs-Merrill, 1954.
- Cashin, Joan. The War Was You and Me: Civilians in the American Civil War. Princeton, N.J.: Princeton Univ. Press, 2002.
- Chamlee Jr., Roy Z. Lincoln's Assassins: A Complete Account of Their Capture, Trial, and Punishment. Jefferson, N.C.: McFarland & Co., 1989.
- Danilov, Victor. Women and Museums: A Comprehensive Guide. Lanham, Md.: AltaMira Press, 2005.
- Griffin, John Chandler. Abraham Lincoln's Execution. Gretna, La.: Pelican Publishing Co., 2006.
- Harris, Thomas Mealey. Assassination of Lincoln: A History of the Great Conspiracy, Trial of the Conspirators by a Military Commission, and a Review of the Trial of John H. Surratt. Boston: American Citizen Company, 1892.
- Heidler, David Stephen; Heidler, Jeanne T.; and Coles, David J. Encyclopedia of the American Civil War: A Political, Social, and Military History. New York: W.W. Norton & Co., 2000.
- James, Edward T. Notable American Women: A Biographical Dictionary. Cambridge, Mass.: Belknap Press of Harvard University Press, 2004.
- Jampoler, Andrew C. A. The Last Lincoln Conspirator: John Surratt's Flight From the Gallows. Annapolis, Md.: Naval Institute Press, 2008.
- Jordan, David M. Winfield Scott Hancock: A Soldier's Life. Bloomington, Ind.: Indiana University Press, 1988.
- Kauffman, Michael W. American Brutus. New York: Random House, 2004.
- Larson, Kate Clifford. The Assassin's Accomplice: Mary Surratt and the Plot to Kill Abraham Lincoln. Basic Books, 2008.
- Leonard, Elizabeth D. Lincoln's Avengers: Justice, Revenge, and Reunion After the Civil War. New York: Norton, 2004.
- National Park Service. The National Register of Historic Places. Supplement 1974. Washington, D.C.: National Park Service, 1974.
- Oldroyd, Osborn H. The Assassination of Abraham Lincoln: Flight, Pursuit, Capture, and Punishment of the Conspirators. Washington, D.C.: O.H. Oldroyd, 1901.
- Phillips, Larissa. Women Civil War Spies of the Confederacy. New York: Rosen Publishing Group, 2004.
- Schroeder-Lein, Glenna R. and Zuczek, Richard. Andrew Johnson: A Biographical Companion. Santa Barbara, Calif.: ABC-CLIO, 2001.
- Steers Jr., Edward. "'Let the Stain of Innocent Blood Be Removed from the Land': The Military Trial of the Lincoln Conspirators." In The Lincoln Assassination: Crime and Punishment, Myth and Memory. Harold Holzer, Craig L. Symonds, and Frank J. Williams, eds. New York: Fordham University Press, 2010.
- Steers Jr., Edward. The Lincoln Assassination Encyclopedia. New York: Harper Perennial, 2010.
- "Surratt, Mary Eugenia Jenkins (1817-1865)." In Historical Dictionary of Reconstruction. Hans Louis Trefousse, ed. New York: Greenwood Press, 1991.
- Swanson, James L. Manhunt: The Twelve Day Chase for Lincoln's Killer. New York: HarperCollins, 2007.
- Swanson, James L. and Weinberg, Daniel R. Lincoln's Assassins: Their Trial and Execution. New York: Harper Perennial, 2008.
- Townsend, George Alfred. The Life, Crime and Capture of John Wilkes Booth. New York: Dick and Fitzgerald, Publishers, 1886.
- Trindal, Elizabeth Steger. Mary Surratt: An American Tragedy. Pelican Pub. Co., 1996.
- Turner, Thomas Reed. Beware the People Weeping: Public Opinion and the Assassination of Abraham Lincoln. Baton Rouge: Louisiana State University Press, 1982.
- Verge, Laurie. "Mary Elizabeth Surratt". In The Trial: The Assassination of President Lincoln and the Trial of the Conspirators. Lexington, Ky.: University Press of Kentucky, 2003.
- Zanca, Kenneth J.. The Catholics and Mrs. Mary Surratt: How They Responded to the Trial and Execution of the Lincoln Conspirator. University Press of America, 2008.
