= Clinton, Maryland =

Unincorporated community in Maryland, United States

- Census-designated place
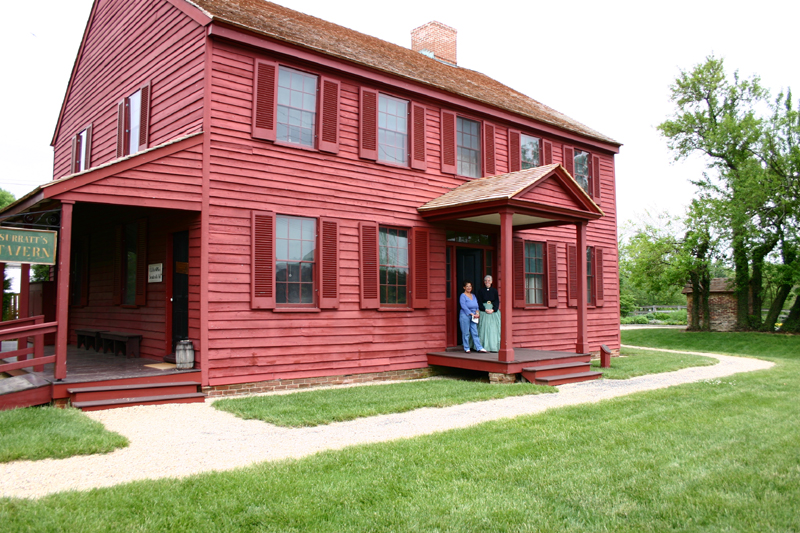
- The Surratt House in 2006

- Location of Clinton, Maryland
- Coordinates: 38°45′49″N 76°53′44″W
- Country: United States
- State: Maryland
- County: Prince George's

Area
  - Total: 25.09 sq mi (64.99 km^{2})
  - Land: 25.02 sq mi (64.79 km^{2})
  - Water: 0.077 sq mi (0.20 km^{2})
- Elevation: 249 ft (76 m)

Population (2020)
  - Total: 38,760
  - Density: 1,549.4/sq mi (598.21/km^{2})
- Time zone: UTC−5 (Eastern (EST))
  - Summer (DST): UTC−4 (EDT)
- ZIP code: 20735
- Area codes: 301, 240
- FIPS code: 24-17900
- GNIS feature ID: 0597253

Clinton is an unincorporated census-designated place (CDP) in Prince George's County, Maryland, United States. Clinton was formerly known as Surrattsville until after the time of the Civil War, and Robeystown from 1865 to 1878. The population of Clinton was 38,760 at the 2020 census. Clinton is historically known for its role in the American Civil War concerning the Abraham Lincoln assassination. Clinton is adjacent to Camp Springs, Rosaryville, Melwood, Brandywine and Andrews Air Force Base.

== History ==
Clinton was founded in the 1770s. The town, then named Surratt's Villa, was actually a simple crossroads with a few buildings. In the 1800s, it became known as Surrattsville. The main building served as the post office, an inn and tavern, and a polling place. This main residence was one of two properties owned by the widowed Mary Surratt; the second property was in Washington, D.C.

On 14 and 15 April 1865, John Wilkes Booth, who had two hours earlier assassinated President Abraham Lincoln, stopped by the Surrattsville tavern to pick up weapons and supplies. The U.S. government alleged that Mary Surratt had gone there earlier with these supplies, and was in collusion with the conspirators, one of whom was her son, John Surratt. Because she was found guilty of complicity in the Lincoln assassination, Mary Surratt was hanged at the Capitol Prison in Washington D.C., on 7 July 1865. (Her house is now the Surratt House Museum, with a focus on the assassination.) The U.S. Post Office renamed the town Robeystown, due to the notoriety of the Surratt name, and in keeping with naming towns after the postmaster. The name was officially changed to Clinton on October 18, 1878. Prince George's County Postbellum Post Offices and Postmasters The local high school, however, retains the name of Surrattsville.

The Wyoming house, a historic frame house built in three phases between the 18th and early 19th centuries, is also a part of Clinton's history. The house consists of a main block with gambrel roof (late 18th century), kitchen (c. 1800), and connecting block (c. 1850). The Wyoming house is listed in the Maryland Inventory of Historical Properties and the Historic American Buildings Survey.

In 1913, Blossie Keubeth Miller founded a general store at the town's main intersection. The current commercial property, built in the 1950s, houses a liquor store and is still owned by the Miller family.

Yuri Nosenko, a KGB defector, was confined and interrogated at a safehouse in Clinton from April 4, 1964, to August 13, 1965.

Clinton is also associated with the 2002 Beltway sniper attacks. A survivor of the attacks was shot in Clinton, while Mildred Muhammad, ex-wife of sniper John Allen Muhammad, was a Clinton resident.

== Geography ==
Clinton is located at 38°45′49″N 76°53′44″W (38.763711, −76.895458). According to the United States Census Bureau, the CDP has a total area of 25.1 square miles (64.9 km^{2}), of which 25.0 square miles (64.7 km^{2}) is land and 0.077 square miles (0.2 km^{2}), or 0.31%, is water.

== Demographics ==
Historical population
Census	Pop.	Note	%±
1980	16,438		—
1990	19,987		21.6%
2000	26,064		30.4%
2010	35,970		38.0%
2020	38,760		7.8%
U.S. Decennial Census; 2010 2020

=== Racial and ethnic composition ===
Clinton CDP, Maryland – Racial and ethnic composition Note: the US Census treats Hispanic/Latino as an ethnic category. This table excludes Latinos from the racial categories and assigns them to a separate category. Hispanics/Latinos may be of any race.
Race / Ethnicity (NH = Non-Hispanic)	Pop 2000	Pop 2010	Pop 2020	% 2000	% 2010	% 2020
White alone (NH)	5,176	3,508	2,286	19.86%	9.75%	5.90%
Black or African American alone (NH)	19,102	28,784	29,916	73.29%	80.02%	77.18%
Native American or Alaska Native alone (NH)	118	103	99	0.45%	0.29%	0.26%
Asian alone (NH)	637	903	958	2.44%	2.51%	2.47%
Native Hawaiian or Pacific Islander alone (NH)	4	11	9	0.02%	0.03%	0.02%
Other race alone (NH)	42	57	259	0.16%	0.16%	0.67%
Mixed race or Multiracial (NH)	491	739	1,258	1.88%	2.05%	3.25%
Hispanic or Latino (any race)	494	1,865	3,975	1.90%	5.18%	10.26%
Total	26,064	35,970	38,760	100.00%	100.00%	100.00%

=== 2020 census ===
As of the 2020 census, Clinton had a population of 38,760. The median age was 44.5 years. 19.3% of residents were under the age of 18 and 18.5% of residents were 65 years of age or older. For every 100 females there were 88.9 males, and for every 100 females age 18 and over there were 86.7 males age 18 and over.

87.9% of residents lived in urban areas, while 12.1% lived in rural areas.

There were 13,308 households in Clinton, of which 30.5% had children under the age of 18 living in them. Of all households, 46.7% were married-couple households, 15.6% were households with a male householder and no spouse or partner present, and 33.5% were households with a female householder and no spouse or partner present. About 21.7% of all households were made up of individuals and 9.5% had someone living alone who was 65 years of age or older.

There were 13,725 housing units, of which 3.0% were vacant. The homeowner vacancy rate was 1.2% and the rental vacancy rate was 4.9%.

Racial composition as of the 2020 census
Race	Number	Percent
White	2,542	6.6%
Black or African American	30,194	77.9%
American Indian and Alaska Native	201	0.5%
Asian	974	2.5%
Native Hawaiian and Other Pacific Islander	11	0.0%
Some other race	2,479	6.4%
Two or more races	2,359	6.1%

=== 2000 census ===
As of the census of 2000, there were 26,064 people, 8,605 households, and 6,772 families residing in the CDP. The population density was 2,208.6 inhabitants per square mile (852.7/km^{2}). There were 8,962 housing units at an average density of 759.4 per square mile (293.2/km^{2}). The racial makeup of the CDP was 20.56% white, 73.69% black, 0.47% Native American, 2.47% Asian, 0.02% Pacific Islander, 0.72% from other races, and 2.08% from two or more races. Hispanic or Latino people of any race were 1.90% of the population (but have likely increased since 2000).

There were 8,605 households, out of which 38.5% had children under the age of 18 living with them, 58.8% were married couples living together, 15.2% had a female householder with no husband present, and 21.3% were non-families. 17.4% of all households were made up of individuals, and 5.3% had someone living alone who was 65 years of age or older. The average household size was 2.96 and the average family size was 3.32.

In the CDP, the population was spread out, with 27.2% under the age of 18, 6.7% from 18 to 24, 30.7% from 25 to 44, 26.4% from 45 to 64, and 9.1% who were 65 years of age or older. The median age was 37 years. For every 100 females, there were 89.1 males. For every 100 females age 18 and over, there were 84.8 males.

The median income for a household in the CDP was $71,139, and the median income for a family was $75,036 (these figures had risen to $90,285 and $97,640 respectively as of a 2007 estimate). Males had a median income of $41,736 versus $39,545 for females. The per capita income for the CDP was $24,949. About 2.4% of families and 3.4% of the population were below the poverty line, including 2.5% of those under age 18 and 10.2% of those age 65 or over.

== Government and infrastructure ==
Prince George's County Police Department District 5 Station in Clinton CDP serves the community.

The U.S. Postal Service operates the Clinton Post Office.

== Education ==
In the 2016 budget, Clinton schools spent approximately $14,000 per student. By average, there are 18 pupils per teacher, 789 students per librarian, and 431 children per counselor in Clinton (zip 20735) schools.

=== Primary and secondary schools ===
Prince George's County Public Schools operates public schools serving Clinton. The community is served by the following schools:

Elementary:

- Clinton Grove Elementary School - in the Clinton CDP
- James Ryder Randall Elementary School - in the Clinton CDP
- Waldon Woods Elementary School - in the Clinton CDP
- Francis T. Evans Elementary School - adjacent to the Clinton CDP in the Andrews AFB CDP
- Melwood Elementary School
- Rose Valley Elementary School
- Tayac Elementary School

Middle:

- Stephen Decatur Middle School - in the Clinton CDP
- James Madison Middle School
- Gwynn Park Middle School
- Isaac J. Gourdine Middle School

High:

- Surrattsville High School - in the Clinton CDP
- Frederick Douglass High School
- Gwynn Park High School
- Dr. Henry A. Wise High School
- Friendly High School

Other:

- Tanglewood Regional

==== Private schools ====
- Clinton Christian School
- Grace Brethren Christian Church and School
- Henson Valley Academy
- Independent Baptist Academy
- Jabez Christian Academy
- Outreach Christian Center Academy
- St. John the Evangelist School
- St. Mary's of Piscataway Catholic School and Church

=== Public libraries ===
The Prince George's County Memorial Library System operates the Surratts-Clinton Branch in Clinton.

== Notable people ==
- Lindsay Allen, WNBA player
- Luke Barnett, actor known for his Funny or Die episodes
- Beth Bernobich, Lambda Literary Award-winning author
- Tray Chaney, actor on The Wire as "Poot"
- Dante Cunningham, basketball player, power forward for New Orleans Pelicans
- Joe Haden, NFL defensive back
- Marcia Gay Harden, Academy Award-winning actress
- Taraji P. Henson, Golden Globe-winning and Academy Award-nominated actress
- Trevor Keels, NBA basketball player
- Ty Lawson, basketball player
- Rodney McLeod, NFL defensive back
- Thomas V. Mike Miller, Jr., Maryland State Senate president
- Yuri Nosenko, KGB defector
- Patrick O’Connell, 3-Star Michelin chef and owner of The Inn at Little Washington
- Chris Rice, CCM singer/songwriter
- Tank, R&B singer
- Delonte West, NBA basketball player
- Brian Westbrook, NFL running back
- Laura Wright, actress
