= John M. Lloyd =

American police officer (1835–1892)

John Minchin Lloyd
- Born: 1835; Maryland, U.S.
- Died: 1892 (aged 56–57); Washington, D.C., U.S.
- Occupations: Police officer, tavern owner, bricklayer
- Known for: Testified in the Abraham Lincoln assassination conspiracy trials

John Minchin Lloyd (1835 — December 18, 1892) was a bricklayer and police officer in Washington, D.C., in the United States. He was one of the first police officers hired by the Metropolitan Police Department of the District of Columbia when its Day Watch was first formed in 1855. He played a role in the trial of the conspirators in the Abraham Lincoln assassination. Arrested but never charged in the conspiracy, Lloyd's testimony was critical in convicting Mary Surratt.

== Early life and career ==
John Minchin Lloyd's date of birth is not clear, but two sources have him born in 1835 in southern Maryland in the United States to William Lloyd. (Note: Trindall gives his birth date as December 18, 1824.) He was the oldest of two sons. By 1850, 14-year-old John and his father had moved into Washington, D.C. He probably had little schooling, and instead apprenticed as a bricklayer. By 1855, John Lloyd was working full-time as a bricklayer, and living at 506 8th Street NW.

The City of Washington had organized a night constabulary in October 1804, but after members of the Whig Party rioted in the city in 1842 and nearly assaulted President John Tyler, a new police force was organized. In March 1851, the police force was reorganized into a day watch, night watch, and auxiliary. John M. Lloyd was appointed one of new police officers, at a yearly salary of $480 ($18,576 in 2025 dollars). It is not clear when Lloyd joined the force or what duties he was assigned, for he does not appear in the list of officers assigned to wards in 1851. But in 1855, records show that Lloyd was assigned to the 7th Police District, (Note: Lloyd was living at 91 M Street SW in 1855.) and his pay was raised to $576 a year ($19,903 in 2025 dollars). His pay rose to $630 a year ($23,443 in 2025 dollars) in 1858.

The District of Columbia's Metropolitan Police Department was organized by Congress in August 1861, replacing the police forces of the City of Washington, Georgetown, and the District of Columbia (that portion of the District outside the City of Washington's city limits). For reasons that are not clear, Lloyd left the Metropolitan Police Department in 1862. His profession upon leaving the police force is also unknown. It is well understood, however, that Lloyd was openly sympathetic to the cause of the Confederate States of America. The American Civil War began in April 1861, and in 1862 Lloyd may have left the force due to his political views.

== Involvement in the Lincoln assassination ==
=== Leasing the Surratt tavern ===
Lloyd moved out of the District of Columbia after resigning from the police force, and into Prince George's County. He later told Mary Surratt that he spent time running a tavern there. In December 1864, Lloyd moved to the bustling village of Surrattsville. Mary Surratt, a widow and Confederate sympathizer, owned a tavern, inn, carriage house, corn crib, forge, general store, granary, gristmill, stable, tobacco curing house, wheelwright's shop in the center of town, and 200 acres (81 hectares) of nearby farmland. In the fall of 1864, she began considering moving to her townhouse in the city. Surratt leased her tavern to Lloyd on December 1 for $500 a year, and moved into town the same day.

Mrs. Surratt lived in her townhouse with her daughter, Anna, and son, John. Over the next five months, she rented rooms to a number of people, including Louis J. Weichmann; John Surratt; George Atzerodt, and Lewis Powell. The latter three men, together with David Herold and John Wilkes Booth, subsequently conspired to kidnap President Abraham Lincoln in March 1865. When that plot failed, they decided to assassinate the president instead. Lincoln was fatally shot at Ford's Theatre on the evening of April 14, 1865.

=== Meetings with the conspirators ===
As part of the plot to kidnap Lincoln in March 1865, John Surratt, Atzerodt, and conspirator David Herold hid two Spencer carbines, ammunition, and some other supplies at the Surratt tavern in Surrattsville. On April 11, Mary Surratt rented a carriage and drove to the Surrattsville tavern to collect (she later said) a debt owed her by a former neighbor. But according to Lloyd, Surratt told him to get the "shooting irons" ready to be picked up. Worried that the inn might be searched by federal troops, Lloyd was concerned about the weapons left in his possession. Later that day, he asked George Atzerodt what to do with them, and was told to bury them.

Surratt once again visited the family tavern in Surrattsville on April 14 (the day of the assassination) to collect a debt. Shortly before she left the city, Booth visited the Surratt boarding house and spoke privately with Mrs. Surratt. He gave her a package (later found to contain binoculars) to give to Lloyd. Surratt delivered the package and, according to Lloyd, again told him to have the "shooting irons" ready for pick-up and handed him a wrapped package from Booth. (Booth and Herold picked up the rifles and binoculars that evening as they fled Washington after Lincoln's assassination.) Lloyd repaired a broken spring on Mrs. Surratt's wagon before she left.

=== Arrest and confession ===
Federal investigators immediately identified Booth and his co-conspirators, and believed they had headed south into Maryland and then Virginia in an attempt to escape. Nodley Anderson, an innkeeper in the hamlet of Piscataway, Maryland, notified them that the Surratt tavern in Surrattsville was a notorious meeting place for Confederate spies, and that Lloyd may know something about the assassination. When questioned, Lloyd initially denied knowing Booth or Herold, and had seen neither man the night of the assassination. He was questioned a second time by D.C. police, and repeated his claims. After the police left, he fled the tavern and went to the home of his wife's relatives in the hamlet of Allens Fresh, Charles County, Maryland. But local Surrattsville residents told investigators that Lloyd did indeed know Booth and some of the other conspirators, and with Mrs. Surratt having been arrested on April 17, federal troops finally went in pursuit of Lloyd. Lloyd had already decided to return to Surrattsville to avoid suspicion, and was arrested on the road there on April 18, 1865.

John Lloyd was interrogated at a makeshift headquarters in Robey's post office in Surrattsville on April 18, 19, and 20. His interrogators included Captain George Cottingham, U.S. Army, several other U.S. Army officers, and several D.C police detectives. Whether Lloyd was tortured in order to obtain his testimony is highly contested by published sources. Several sources claim Lloyd was an alcoholic, and was denied liquor or bribed with it in order to make him talk. (Note: Whether Lloyd was an alcoholic is hotly contested. Many sources, such as Jameson; Balsiger and Sellier; and Tidwell, Hall, and Gaddy claim he was a drunkard all his life. But documentation of this is lacking. It is well-documented, however, that several weeks before the assassination, Lloyd began drinking very heavily and was drunk the day of the event. But as Larson points out, many eyewitnesses said Lloyd was not so drunk, however, that he could not repair Mrs. Surratt's wagon spring, and was sober enough to steer his wagon to Washington, D.C., and back without weaving on the road.) Some sources claim Lloyd was hung by his thumbs until he agreed to testify against Mrs. Surratt. (Note: Jameson provides no source or citation for this claim. Trindall, and Balsiger and Sellier, rely on an unpublished paper by David Rankin Barbee titled "The Murder of Mrs. Surratt", presented at the Emerson Institute (a private D.C. prep school) on February 25, 1950.) Higdon says Lloyd was merely threatened with hanging by his thumbs, but not tortured. But most sources claim that Lloyd was merely intensively interrogated without the use of torture or deprivation of alcohol. (Note: Gary R. Planck, literary editor of the Lincoln Herald (a scholarly journal publishing articles about Abraham Lincoln, the Civil War, and America in the 1850s and 1860s), has pointed out that "being 'coerced into giving testimony,' even threatened if he failed to do so, does not prove the testimony given was false.") Larson argues that the interrogation merely consisted of "several days of back-and-forth questioning, stalling, intimidation, and obfuscation, manipulating Lloyd and wearing him down in the hopes of extracting a confession." Cottingham revealed that Secretary of War Edwin M. Stanton had called for the death penalty for the conspirators. Cottingham played off Lloyd's fears that his family might also be arrested or tried, and that the military would seek to put him to death unless he confessed. Lloyd told Cottingham that he feared being murdered by the other conspirators, but by April 22 Cottingham had wrung a full confession from Lloyd.

Lloyd informed his interrogators that John Surratt, Atzerodt, and Herold had hidden a pair of carbines, ammunition, some rope, and a wrench in a wall on the second floor. He admitted that Mrs. Surratt had reminded him of their existence on April 11 and April 14. He also revealed that Booth and Herold had visited the tavern near midnight on April 14, taking one of the guns as well as the field glasses and some whiskey. Booth, Lloyd said, bragged that he had killed Lincoln. Lloyd helped the investigators recover the second gun, which confirmed his testimony. Seeing his wife at the tavern, Lloyd cried, "Oh, [that] Mrs. Surratt, that vile woman, she has ruined me! I am to be shot!"

Lloyd was transferred to the Union Army's headquarters at Bryantown, Maryland, where he was further interrogated by Colonel Henry H. Wells. He revealed more details of the conspiracy, and of Booth and Herold's visit on April 14. Portions of his testimony tended to implicate John and Mary Surratt, George Atzertodt, and David Herold in the assassination plot.

Lloyd was transferred to the Old Capitol Prison in Washington D.C., on April 23. He was questioned further there.

=== Assassination trial testimony ===
Although John Lloyd was imprisoned for some weeks, he was never charged with any crimes and was eventually released. The reason was his testimony: The law at the time did not permit prosecutors to try a witness for conspiracy if he testified against his co-conspirators. Secretary of War Stanton and military prosecutors understood that Lloyd would go free, but they would win the conviction of Surratt and the others in the process.

The prosecution presented nine witnesses against Mrs. Surratt, but most of their case rested on the testimony of just two men—John Lloyd and Surratt boarding house tenant Louis Weichmann.

Lloyd testified on May 13 and 15, 1865, regarding the hiding of the carbines and other supplies at the tavern in March, and the two conversations he had with Mrs. Surratt in which she told him to get the "shooting irons" ready. (Note: George Atzerodt made a statement to James McPhail, the civilian Provost Marshal of Baltimore, on May 1, 1865. McPhail, accompanied by Atzerodt's brother-in-law, John L. Smith, interviewed Atzerodt, who revealed that Dr. Samuel Mudd was much more intimately involved in the kidnap and murder plots against Lincoln than other evidence suggested. Confirming some of Lloyd's testimony, Atzerodt also said that Mary Surratt had gone to the tavern on April 15 specifically to retrieve the weapons hidden there a month earlier by Atzerodt, Herold, and her son John. However, McPhail turned this statement over to Atzerodt's attorney, William E. Doster, rather than to General John F. Hartranft, commander of the Old Capitol Prison and the individual overseeing the continuing interrogations. Doster, perhaps realizing how damaging it was, did nothing with it. The testimony was only briefly and tangentially raised at the trial. In 1977, historian Joan Chaconas contacted Doster's grandson, who showed her papers containing Atzerodt's statement. "Had it been revealed," historians Edward F. Steers and Harold Holzer write, "it most likely would have sent Dr. Samuel Mudd to the gallows.") The defense called Captain Cottingham, and unintentionally damaged its case. Cottingham testified that Lloyd feared that the conspirators would kill him. When asked who Cottingham believed the conspirators to be, he mentioned Lloyd's outburst about "Mrs. Surratt, that vile woman" and said he had concluded that Lloyd meant Mrs. Surratt was one of the conspirators. Lloyd's testimony had been the most important for the prosecution's case, for it indicated Mary Surratt played an active role in the conspiracy in the days just before Lincoln's death.

The defense strategy was to impeach Lloyd's testimony. Several witnesses impugned Lloyd's character by testifying about his alcoholism. Several eyewitnesses said he appeared completely intoxicated on the day of Lincoln's death (April 14), implying that he could not have remembered with clarity what happened that day. Surratt's chief attorney, Reverdy Johnson, asserted repeatedly that Lloyd was an unreliable witness, and that the evidence against Mary Surratt was entirely circumstantial. The only evidence linking Surratt to the conspiracy to kill Lincoln, he said, came from Lloyd and Weichmann, and neither man was telling the truth (he said). Lloyd's testimony was coerced, he claimed. The government's case was hindered by its failure to call as a witness the man who shared Lloyd's carriage when he talked with Mrs. Surratt (an individual who could have verified Lloyd's version of the "shooting irons" story).

The nine-member military tribunal hearing the case sentenced Mary Surratt, George Atzerodt, David Herold, and Lewis Powell to death on July 5, 1865. As their crimes had occurred in an area under military jurisdiction, the Habeas Corpus Suspension Act denied them any appeal. The four were hanged at the Washington Arsenal on July 7, 1865.

== Death and descendants ==
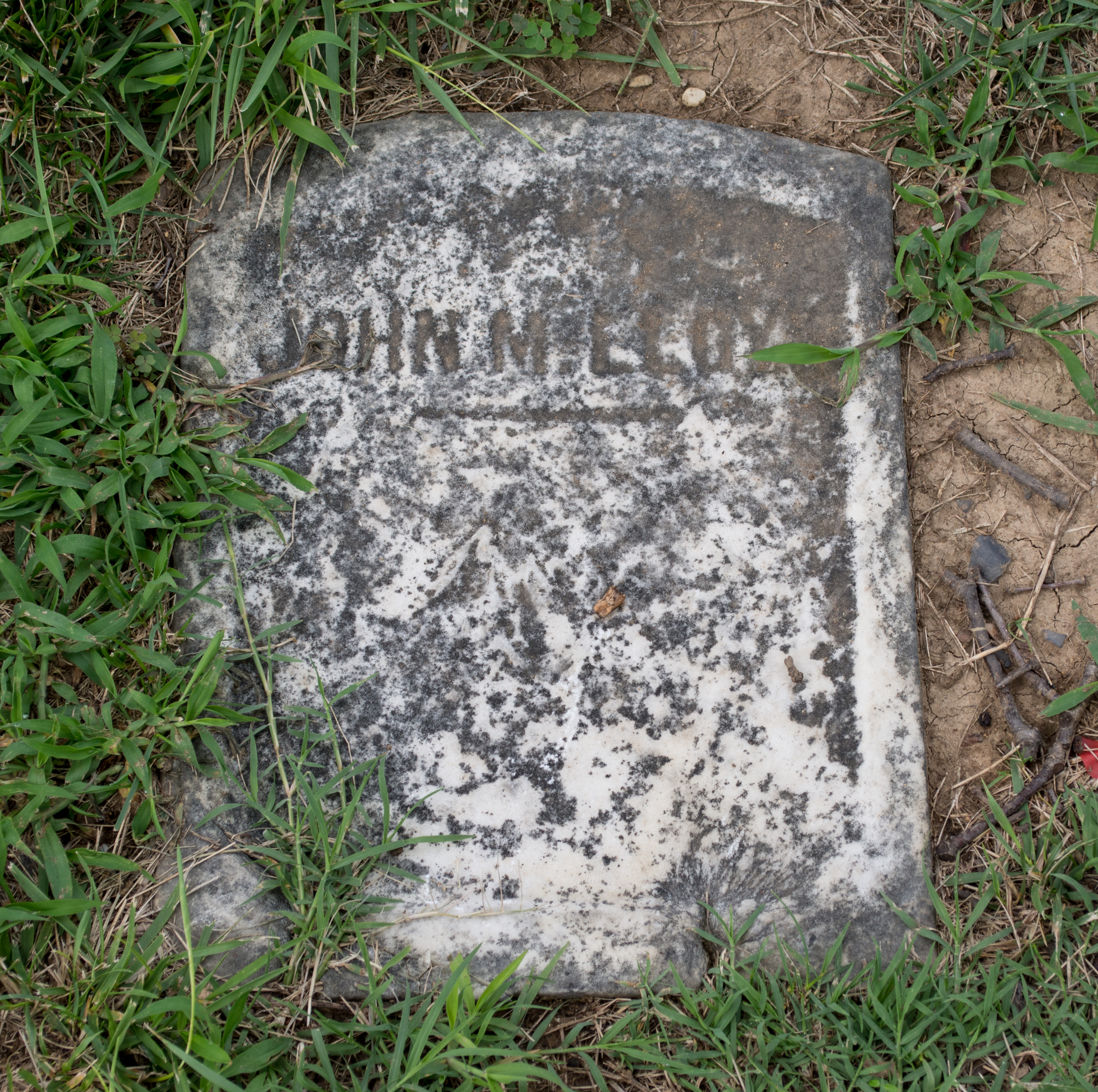
Grave of John M. Lloyd at Mount Olivet Cemetery in Washington, D.C.

In October 1865, Lloyd moved back to the District of Columbia from Surrattsville.

For the rest of his life, Lloyd worked as a bricklayer and construction contractor in Washington, D.C. He was severely injured in early December 1892 when, while helping to construct a building, the scaffold he was standing on collapsed. He died on December 18. A Roman Catholic, Lloyd was buried in Mount Olivet Cemetery. Mary Surratt's grave is about 150 feet (46 m) away from Lloyd's.

=== Personal life ===
The 21-year-old John married 20-year-old Mary Elizabeth Mahorney (sometimes spelled Mahoney) of Virginia in 1857. They had several children, but all died of smallpox at a young age and none survived him.

== See also ==
- The Conspirator

== Bibliography ==
- Balsiger, David W.; Sellier, Charles E. Jr. (1977). The Lincoln Conspiracy. Los Angeles: Schick Sunn Classic Books. ISBN 9780917214035.
- Busch, Francis X. (1954). Enemies of the state: An Account of the Trials of the Mary Eugenia Surrat Case, the Teapot Dome Cases, the Alphonse Capone Case and the Rosenburg Case. Indianapolis: Bobbs-Merrill.
- Cashin, Joan (2002). The War Was You and Me: Civilians in the American Civil War. Princeton, N.J.: Princeton University Press. ISBN 0691091730.
- Chamlee, Roy Z. Jr. (1989). Lincoln's Assassins: A Complete Account of Their Capture, Trial, and Punishment. Jefferson, N.C.: McFarland & Co. ISBN 0899504205.
- District of Columbia Supreme Court (1867). Trial of John H. Surratt in the Criminal Court for the District of Columbia, Hon. George P. Fisher Presiding. Washington, D.C.: Government Printing Office. p. 276. "John Lloyd moved Surrattsvilles."
- Fishel, Edwin C. (1996). Secret War for the Union. New York: Houghton Mifflin. ISBN 9780395901366.
- Griffin, John Chandler (2006). Abraham Lincoln's Execution. Gretna, La.: Pelican Publishing Co. ISBN 9781589803954.
- Higdon, Hal (2008). The Union vs. Dr. Mudd. Gainesville, Fla.: University Press of Florida. ISBN 9780813032672.
- Jameson, W.C. (2013). John Wilkes Booth: Beyond the Grave. Lanham, Md.: Taylor Trade Publishing. ISBN 9781589798311.
- Kauffmann, Michael W. (2004). American Brutus. New York: Random House. ISBN 037550785X.
- Larson, Kate Clifford (2008). The Assassin's Accomplice: Mary Surratt and the Plot to Kill Abraham Lincoln. New York: Basic Books. ISBN 9780465038152.
- Leonard, Elizabeth D. (2004). Lincoln's Avengers: Justice, Revenge, and Reunion After the Civil War. New York: Norton. ISBN 0393048683.
- Lloyd, Daniel Boone (1971). The Lloyds of Southern Maryland. Washington D.C.: Daniel Boone Lloyd.
- Oldroyd, Osborn H. (1901). The Assassination of Abraham Lincoln: Flight, Pursuit, Capture, and Punishment of the Conspirators. Washington, D.C.: O.H. Oldroyd.
- Pittman, Benn (1865). The Assassination of President Lincoln and the Trial of the Conspirators. Cincinnati: Moore, Wilstach & Baldwin.
- Schuetz, Janice E. (1994). The Logic of Women on Trial: Case Studies of Popular American Trials. Carbondale, Ill.: Southern Illinois University Press. ISBN 0809318695.
- Steers, Edward Jr. (2010). The Lincoln Assassination Encyclopedia. New York: Harper Perennial. ISBN 9780061787751.
- Steers, Edward Jr.; Holzer, Harold (2009). The Lincoln Assassination Conspirators: Their Confinement and Execution, as Recorded in the Letterbook of John Frederick Hartranft. Baton Rouge, La.: Louisiana State University Press. ISBN 9780807133965.
- Swanson, James L. (2007). Manhunt: The Twelve Day Chase for Lincoln's Killer. New York: HarperCollins. ISBN 978-0060518509.
- Sylvester, Richard (1894). District of Columbia Police: A Retrospect of the Police Organizations of the Cities of Washington and Georgetown and the District of Columbia, With Biographical Sketches and Historic Cases. Washington, D.C.: Gibson Bros., Printers.
- Tidwell, William A.; Hall, James O.; Gaddy, David Winfred (1988). Come Retribution: The Confederate Secret Service and the Assassination of Lincoln. Jackson, Miss.: University Press of Mississippi. ISBN 0878053476.
- Trindal, Elizabeth Steger (1996). Mary Surratt: An American Tragedy. Gretna, La.: Pelican Pub. Co. ISBN 1565541855.
- Turner, Thomas Reed (1982). Beware the People Weeping: Public Opinion and the Assassination of Abraham Lincoln. Baton Rouge, La.: Louisiana State University Press. ISBN 080710986X.
- Verge, Laurie (2003). "Mary Elizabeth Surratt". The Trial: The Assassination of President Lincoln and the Trial of the Conspirators. Lexington, Ky.: University Press of Kentucky. ISBN 9780813122779.
- Zanca, Kenneth J. (2008). The Catholics and Mrs. Mary Surratt: How They Responded to the Trial and the Execution of the Lincoln Conspirator. Lanham, Md.: University Press of America. ISBN 9780761840237.
