= Louis J. Weichmann =

Witness to the assassination of Abraham Lincoln

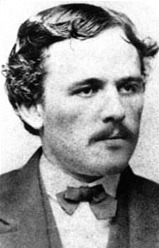
- Born: September 29, 1842; Baltimore, Maryland, US
- Died: June 5, 1902 (aged 59); Anderson, Indiana, US
- Occupations: Clerk, schoolteacher
- Known for: Testifying against Mary Surratt

Louis J. Weichmann (September 29, 1842 – June 5, 1902) was an American clerk who was one of the chief witnesses for the prosecution in the trial following the assassination of Abraham Lincoln. Previously, he had also been a suspect in the conspiracy because of his association with Mary Surratt's family.

== Early life ==
Weichmann was born in Baltimore, the son of German immigrants. The family surname was originally Wiechmann, but as in the case of many who immigrated to the United States, the name underwent several phonetic spelling changes. His father Johann was a Lutheran, and his mother Maria was a Catholic. Johann Weichmann was a tailor by trade, and he moved with his wife and their five children first from the vicinity of Baltimore to Washington D.C., and later to Philadelphia, Pennsylvania.

Weichmann claims to have attended Central High School in the autobiographical work mentioned below. Central High School records show Louis Weichmann was a member of the 36th graduating class. He was admitted July 1856 and left in Sept. 1858 with a Partial Course Diploma.

He wrote in his autobiographical work, A True History of the Assassination of Abraham Lincoln and of the Conspiracy of 1865, that he desired to pursue a career as a pharmacist, but, at the behest of his mother, he reluctantly agreed to study for the Roman Catholic priesthood. At the age of seventeen, he entered the seminary at St. Charles College in Ellicott City, Maryland. There, he met and befriended a fellow seminarian, John Surratt. This friendship was to later have profound consequences for both men.

In 1862, a year after the outbreak of the American Civil War, both Weichmann and Surratt left the seminary without becoming priests. Weichmann went to Washington, D.C., where he taught school for two years at St. Matthew's Institute for Boys. After leaving this position in 1864, he became a clerk in the Department of War, headed by Secretary Edwin Stanton.

In the meantime, Surratt become a courier and agent for the Confederacy, working out of Union territory. As a result of his earlier friendship with Surratt, Weichmann took lodgings in the boarding house of Surratt's mother, Mary Surratt, in Washington, D.C. This brought him into contact with the major conspirators involved in Abraham Lincoln's assassination. According to Weichmann's testimony at the trial of the conspirators, John Wilkes Booth, David Herold, Lewis Payne, George Atzerodt, John Surratt, and others continually met at Mary Surratt's boarding house prior to the assassination.

Weichmann testified that on the day President Lincoln was shot, April 14, 1865, he accompanied Mary Surratt to her other property in Surrattsville, (now Clinton, Maryland), where she delivered items that Booth later retrieved hours after the assassination. He further testified that Mary Surratt met with Booth no fewer than three times on that fateful day.

Samuel Mudd, the doctor who treated Booth's broken leg on the night Lincoln was killed, and claimed to have no knowledge of the conspiracy, was linked by Weichmann's testimony to the events for which he was tried and found guilty as well. Augustus Howell, a blockade runner who worked with John Surratt, claimed during the trial that Weichmann provided the Confederates with classified information obtained by his position at the War Department. He supposedly hoped to obtain a better job from the Confederate government at Richmond in exchange for his services; however, these accusations were never substantiated.

In 1869, Edmund Spangler, a stagehand at Ford's Theatre who was convicted of aiding and abetting Booth's escape from the scene, alleged in a published statement that during his imprisonment he overheard a discussion between Payne, Herold and Atzerodt in which they named Weichmann as a conspirator in Booth's original plot to abduct Lincoln. As all three men had been hanged, Spangler's claim could not be investigated and no supporting evidence was ever found.

== Later life ==
In his later years, Weichmann moved to Anderson, Indiana, where he opened a business school. One of his brothers, a Catholic priest, and two of his sisters had moved and settled there. Because of some lingering doubt as to the truth and motives of his testimony, Weichmann became a controversial and somewhat ostracized figure by many people. That Mary Surratt was the first woman tried and executed for a capital crime by the federal government caused a backlash against him. There also were strong anti-Catholic elements that attempted to link Lincoln's death to a Catholic conspiracy.

Partially because of this, he swore out an affidavit, shortly before his death, reaffirming that all his testimony concerning Abraham Lincoln's assassination was completely true. He died a few days later in Anderson, and is buried there at St. Mary's Cemetery. Despite his using the spelling Weichmann at the conspiracy trial, in all his official correspondence and as the author of his book, the original family spelling of Wiechmann appears on his tombstone.

== Bibliography ==
- Weichmann, Louis J. A True History of the Assassination of Abraham Lincoln and of the Conspiracy of 1865 (1975)
- Chamlee, Roy Z. Jr. (1990). Lincoln's Assassins: A Complete Account of Their Capture, Trial, and Punishment. Jefferson, North Carolina: McFarland & Company. ISBN 0-89950-420-5. Archived from the original on January 12, 2019 – via Google Books.
