= Mary Surratt =

American convicted murder conspirator (1823–1865)

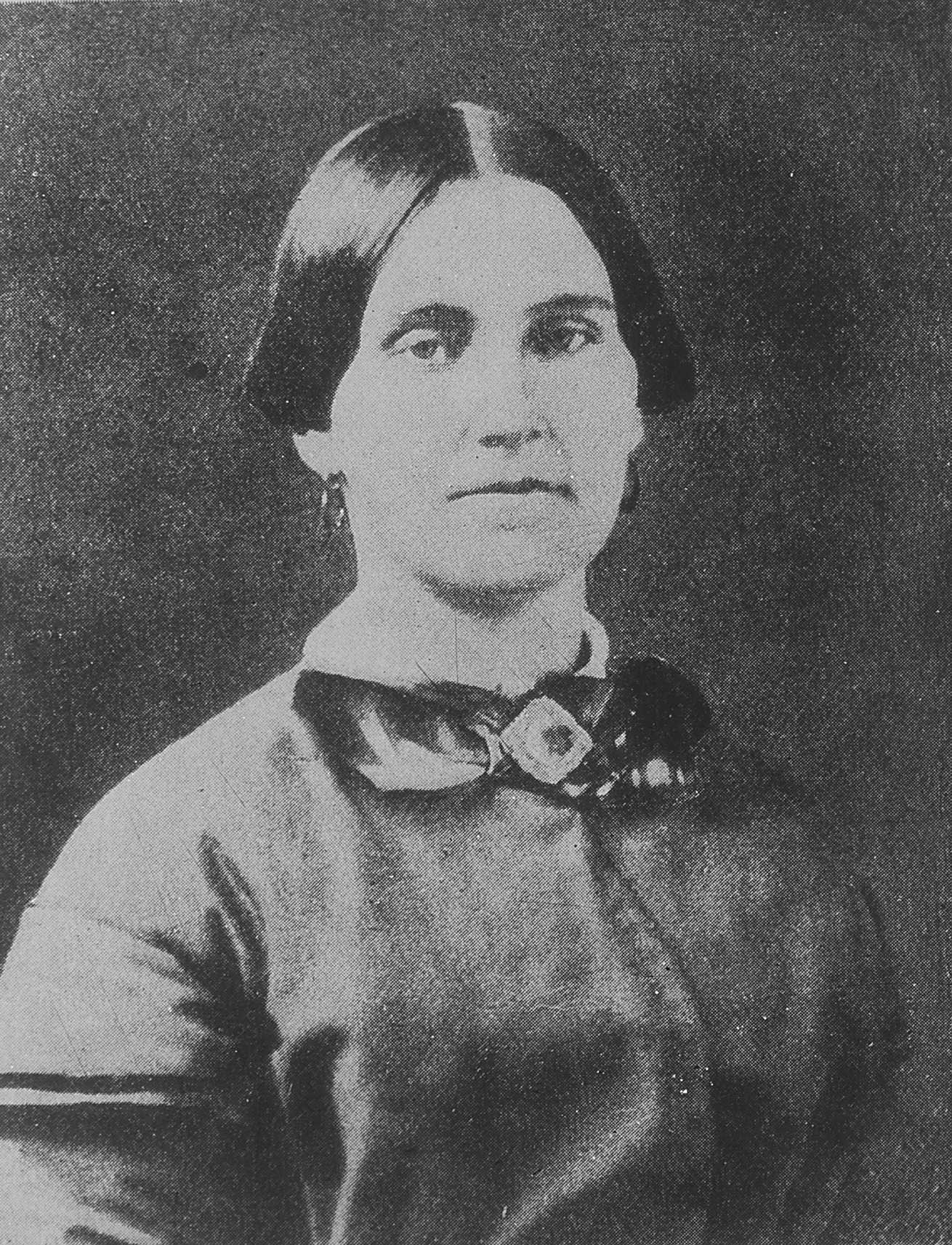
- Surratt, c. 1860–1865
- Born: Mary Elizabeth Jenkins; May 4, 1823; Waterloo, Maryland, U.S.
- Died: July 7, 1865 (aged 42); Arsenal Penitentiary, Washington, D.C., U.S.
- Resting place: Mount Olivet Cemetery
- Occupations: Boarding house and tavern owner
- Known for: Being convicted as a conspirator in the assassination of Abraham Lincoln
- Spouse: John Harrison Surratt (m. 1840; died 1862)
- Children: 3, including John Jr.
- Status: Executed by hanging
- Conviction: Conspiracy to assassinate Abraham Lincoln
- Penalty: Death
- Accomplices: John Wilkes Booth; Lewis Powell; George Atzerodt; David Herold; Samuel Mudd; John Surratt

Details
- Date apprehended: April 17, 1865

Mary Elizabeth Surratt (née Jenkins; May 4, 1823 – July 7, 1865) was an American boarding house owner in Washington, D.C., who was convicted of taking part in the conspiracy which led to the assassination of U.S. president Abraham Lincoln in 1865. Sentenced to death by hanging, she became the first woman executed by the U.S. federal government. Surratt maintained her innocence until her death, and the case against her was and remains controversial. She was the mother of John Surratt, who was later tried in the conspiracy, but was not convicted.

Born in Waterloo, Maryland in the 1820s, she attended school in Alexandria, Virginia. She wed John Harrison Surratt in 1840 and had three children with him. An entrepreneur, John became the owner of a tavern, an inn, and a hotel. The Surratts were sympathetic to the Confederate States of America and often hosted fellow Confederate sympathizers at their tavern. Upon her husband's death in 1862, Surratt had to manage his estate. Tired of doing so without help, Surratt moved to her townhouse in Washington, D.C., which she then ran as a boardinghouse. There, she was introduced to John Wilkes Booth, a stage actor. Booth visited the boardinghouse numerous times, as did George Atzerodt and Lewis Powell, Booth's co-conspirators in the Lincoln assassination. Shortly before killing Lincoln, Booth spoke with Surratt and handed her a package containing binoculars for one of her tenants, John M. Lloyd.

After Lincoln was assassinated, Surratt was arrested, then tried by a military tribunal the following month, along with the other conspirators. She was convicted primarily due to the testimonies of Lloyd, who said that she told him to have the "shooting irons" ready, and Louis J. Weichmann, who testified about Surratt's relationships with Booth. Five of the nine judges at her trial asked that Surratt be granted clemency by President Andrew Johnson because of her age and sex. Johnson did not grant her clemency, though accounts differ as to whether or not he received the clemency request. Surratt was hanged on July 7, 1865, and later buried in Mount Olivet Cemetery.

== Early life ==
Mary Elizabeth Jenkins (baptismal name, Maria Eugenia) was born to Archibald and Elizabeth Anne (née Webster) Jenkins on a tobacco plantation near the southern Maryland town of Waterloo (now known as Clinton). Sources differ as to whether she was born in 1820 or 1823. There is uncertainty as to the month as well, but most sources say May.

She had two brothers: John Jenkins, born in 1822, and James Jenkins, born in 1825. Her father died in the fall of 1825 when Mary was either two or five years old, and Mary's mother then inherited their property (originally part of the His Lordship's Kindness estate).

Although her father was a nondenominational Protestant and her mother Episcopalian, Surratt, raised as an Episcopal was enrolled in a private Catholic girls' boarding school, the Academy for Young Ladies in Alexandria, Virginia, on November 25, 1835. Mary's maternal aunt, Sarah Latham Webster, was a Catholic, which may have influenced where she was sent to school. Within two years, Mary converted to Catholicism and adopted the baptismal name of Maria Eugenia. She stayed at the Academy for Young Ladies for four years, leaving in 1839, when the school closed. She remained an observant Catholic for the rest of her life.

== Married life ==
Mary Jenkins met John Harrison Surratt in 1839, when she was 16 or 19 and he was 26. His family had settled in Maryland in the late 1600s. An orphan, he was adopted by Richard and Sarah Neale of Washington, D.C., a wealthy couple who owned a farm. The Neales divided their farm among their children, and Surratt inherited a portion of it. His background has been described by historian Kate Clifford Larson as "questionable", and he had fathered at least one child out of wedlock. They wed in August 1840. John converted to Catholicism prior to the marriage, and the couple may have wed at a Catholic church in Washington, D.C. John purchased a mill in Oxon Hill, Maryland, and the couple moved there. The Surratts had three children over the next few years: Isaac (born June 2, 1841), Elizabeth Susanna (nicknamed "Anna", born January 1, 1843), and John Jr. (born April 1844).

In 1843, John Surratt purchased from his adoptive father 236 acres (96 ha) of land straddling the DC/Maryland border, a parcel named "Foxhall" (approximately the area between Wheeler Road and Owens Road today). Richard Neale died in September 1843, and a month later, John purchased 119 acres (48 ha) of land adjoining Foxhall. John and Mary Surratt and their children moved back to John's childhood home in the District of Columbia in 1845 to help John's mother run the Neale farm. But Sarah Neale fell ill and died in August 1845, having shortly before her death deeded the remainder of the Neale farm to John. Mary Surratt became involved in raising funds to build St. Ignatius Church in Oxon Hill (it was constructed in 1850), but John was increasingly unhappy with his wife's religious activities. His behavior deteriorated over the next few years. John drank heavily, often failed to pay his debts, and his temper was increasingly volatile and violent.

In 1851, the Neale farmhouse burned to the ground (an escaped family slave was suspected of setting the blaze). John found work on the Orange and Alexandria Railroad. Mary moved with her children into the home of her cousin, Thomas Jenkins, in nearby Clinton. Within a year, John purchased 200 acres (81 ha) of farmland near what is now Clinton, and by 1853, he constructed a tavern and an inn there. Mary initially refused to move herself and the children into the new residence. She took up residence on the old Neale farm, but John sold both the Neale farm and Foxhall in May 1853 to pay debts and she was forced to move back in with him in December.

With the money he earned from the tavern and sale of his other property, on December 6, 1853, John Surratt bought a townhouse at 541 H Street (now known as 604 H St. 2024) in Washington, D.C., and began renting it out to tenants. In 1854, John built a hotel as an addition to his tavern and called it Surratt's Hotel.

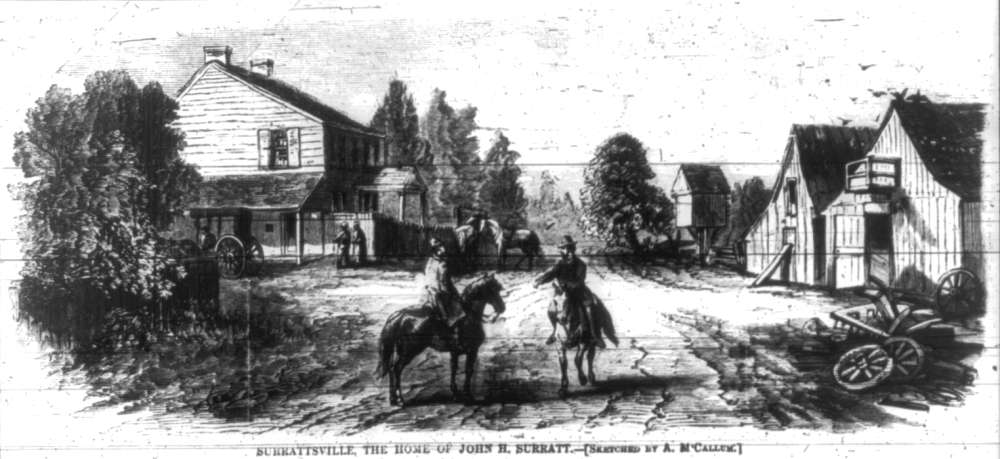
A woodprint depicting Surrattsville and the Surratt home, printed in 1867 in Harper's Weekly.

The area around the tavern was officially named Surrattsville that same year. Travelers could take Branch Road (now Branch Avenue) north into Washington, D.C.; Piscataway Road southwest to Piscataway; or Woodyard Road northeast to Upper Marlboro. Although Surrattsville was a well-known crossroads, the community did not amount to much: just the tavern, a post office (inside the tavern), a forge, and a dozen or so houses (some of them log cabins). John Surratt was the hamlet's first postmaster.

He expanded his family's holdings by selling off land, paying down debt, and starting new businesses. Over the next few years, Surratt acquired or built a carriage house, corn crib, general store, forge, granary, gristmill, stable, tobacco curing house, and wheelwright's shop. The family had enough money to send all three children to nearby Catholic boarding schools. Isaac and John Jr. attended the school at St. Thomas Manor, and Anna enrolled at the Academy for Young Ladies (Mary's alma mater). The family's debts continued to mount, however, and John Sr.'s drinking worsened. John sold another 120 acres (49 ha) of land in 1856 to pay debts. By 1857, Surratt had sold all but 600 acres (240 ha) of the family's formerly extensive holdings (which represented about half the 1,200 acres (4.9 km^{2}) he had originally owned). Most of the family's slaves were also sold to pay debts. Still, his alcoholism worsened. In 1858, Mary wrote a letter to her local priest, telling him that Surratt was drunk every single day. In 1860, St. Thomas Manor School closed, and Isaac found work in Baltimore, Maryland. The Surratts sold off another 100 acres (40 ha) of land, which enabled Anna to remain at the Academy for Young Ladies and for John Jr. to enroll at St. Charles College, Maryland (a Catholic seminary and boarding school in Ellicott's Mills). The couple also borrowed money that same year against their townhouse in Washington, DC, and at some point used the property as collateral for a $1,000 loan.

== Civil War and widowhood ==
The American Civil War began on April 12, 1861. The border state of Maryland remained part of the United States ("the Union"), but the Surratts were Confederate sympathizers, and their tavern regularly hosted fellow sympathizers. The Surratt tavern was being used as a safe house for Confederate spies, and at least one author concludes that Mary had "de facto" knowledge of this. Confederate scout and spy Thomas Nelson Conrad visited Surratt's boarding house before and during the Civil War.

On March 7, 1861, three days after Abraham Lincoln's inauguration as President of the United States, Isaac left Maryland and traveled to Texas, where he enlisted in the Confederate States Army (serving in the 33rd Cavalry, or Duff's Partisan Rangers, 14th Cavalry Battalion). John Jr. quit his studies at St. Charles College in July 1861 and became a courier for the Confederate Secret Service, moving messages, cash, and contraband back and forth across enemy lines. The Confederate activities in and around Surrattsville drew the attention of the Union government. In late 1861, Lafayette C. Baker, a detective with the Union Intelligence Service, and 300 Union soldiers camped in Surrattsville and investigated the Surratts and others for Confederate activities. He quickly uncovered evidence of a large Confederate courier network operating in the area, but despite some arrests and warnings, the courier network remained intact.

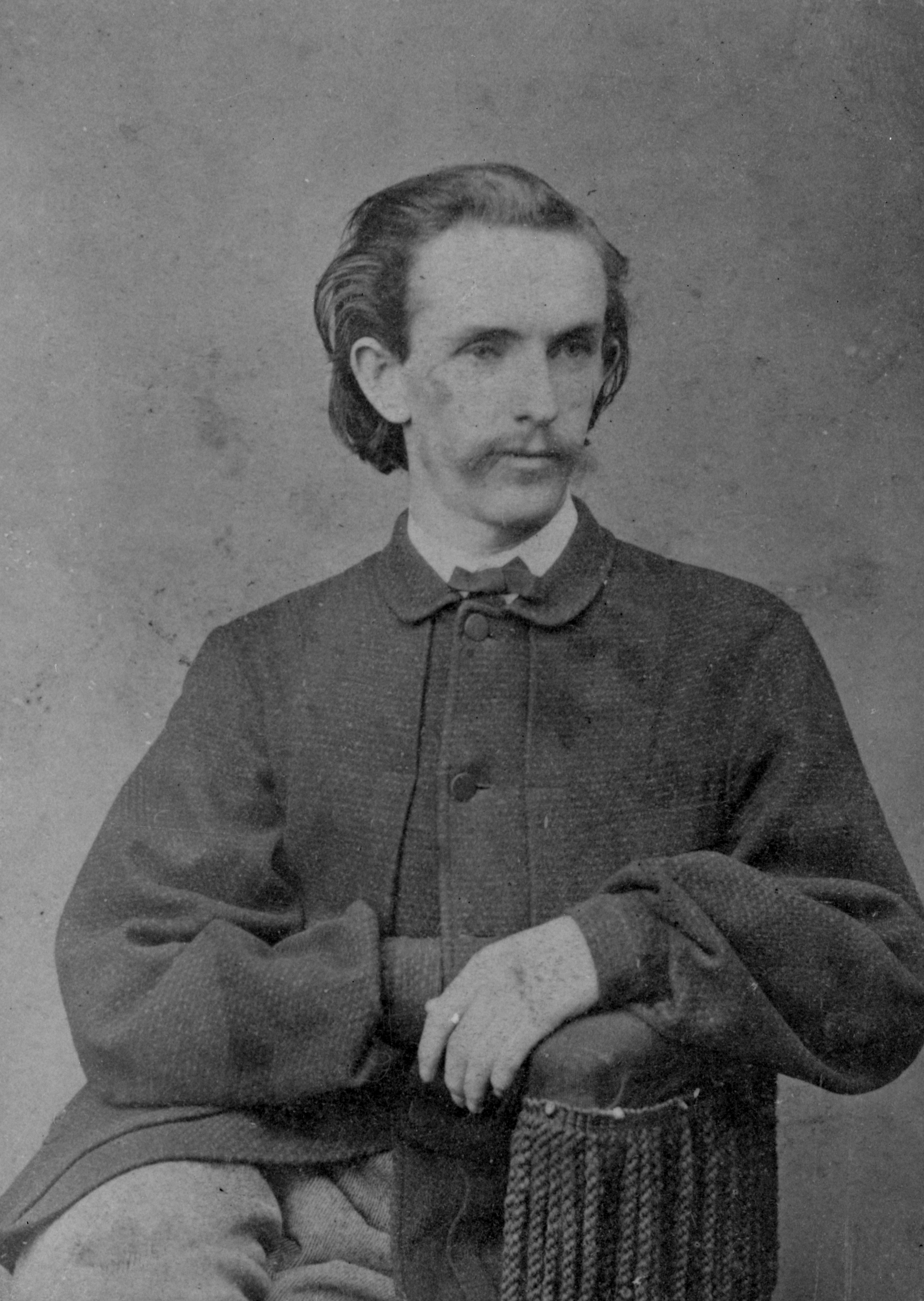
John H. Surratt Jr. (seen here in 1868) was a Confederate courier.

John Surratt collapsed suddenly and died on either August 25 or August 26 in 1862 (sources differ as to the date). The cause of death was a stroke. The Surratt family affairs were in serious financial difficulties. John Jr. and Anna both left school to help their mother run the family's remaining farmland and businesses. On September 10, 1862, John Jr. was appointed postmaster of the Surrattsville post office. Lafayette Baker swept through Surrattsville again in 1862, and several postmasters were dismissed for disloyalty, but John Jr. was not one of them. In August 1863, he sought a job in the paymaster's department in the United States Department of War, but his application caused federal agents to be suspicious about his family's loyalties to the Union. On November 17, 1863, he was dismissed as postmaster for disloyalty.

The loss of John Jr.'s job as postmaster caused a financial crisis for the Surratt family. When John Sr.'s estate was probated in late November 1862, the family owned only two middle-age male slaves. However, by 1863, Louis J. Weichmann, a friend of John Jr. from St. Charles College, observed that the family had six or more slaves working on the property. By 1864, Mary Surratt found that her husband's unpaid debts and bad business deals had left her with many creditors. Several of her slaves ran away. When he was not meeting with Confederate sympathizers in the city, her son was selling vegetables to raise cash for the family. Mary was tired of running the farm, tavern, and other businesses without her son's help. In the fall of 1864, she began considering moving to her townhouse in the city.

On October 1, 1864, she took possession of the townhouse at 604 H Street NW in Washington, D.C. The gray brick house had four stories and stood on a lot 29 feet (8.8 m) wide, 100 feet (30 m) deep. The first floor, which was level with the street, had two large rooms, used as the kitchen and dining room. The second floor had a front and back parlor, with the room in the rear used as Mary Surratt's bedroom. The third floor had three rooms: two in the front and a larger one at the back. The fourth floor, which was considered an attic, had two large and one small room, occupied by a servant. Surratt began moving her belongings into the townhouse that month, and on November 1, 1864, Anna and John Jr. took up residence there. Mary Surratt herself moved into the home on December 1. That same day, she leased the tavern in Surrattsville to a former Washington, D.C., policeman and Confederate sympathizer John M. Lloyd for $500 a year. On November 30, December 8, and December 27, Mary Surratt advertised for lodgers in the Daily Evening Star newspaper. She had initially said that she wanted only lodgers who were known to her personally or were recommended by friends, but in her advertisements, she said rooms were "available for 4 gentlemen."

Some scholars have raised questions about Surratt's move into the city. Historians Kate Larson and Roy Chamlee have noted that although there is no definite proof, a case can be made that Surratt made the move into the city in furtherance of her and her son's espionage activities. For example, Larson and Chamlee say that on September 21, 1864, John Surratt wrote to Weichmann, observing that the family's plans to move into the city were advancing rapidly "on account of certain events having turned up," perhaps a cryptic reference to either his Confederate activities in general or the conspiracy to kidnap or kill Lincoln. Larson has observed that although the move made long-term economic sense for Surratt, it also, in the short term, would have meant moving expenses and furnishing up to 10 rooms in the townhouse, money that she did not have.

Chamlee, too, found little economic reason to move into the city and concluded that it would have been more profitable to rent the H Street boarding house entirely to lodgers. During her time in the city, Surratt tried to keep her daughter away from what she felt were negative influences. Moreover, Surratt still owed money on both the tavern and the townhouse and would take out yet another mortgage against the townhouse in January 1865.

John Jr. transferred all his title to the family property to his mother in January 1865, apparently so his mother could receive the townhouse mortgage. That act may have additional implications. A traitor's property could be seized, and John's spy knowledge was certainly his motivation for relinquishing his title to the houses and land. Mary may have known of his motivation as well or at least suspected. If she did, she would have possessed at least de facto knowledge of the conspiracy.

== Conspiracy ==
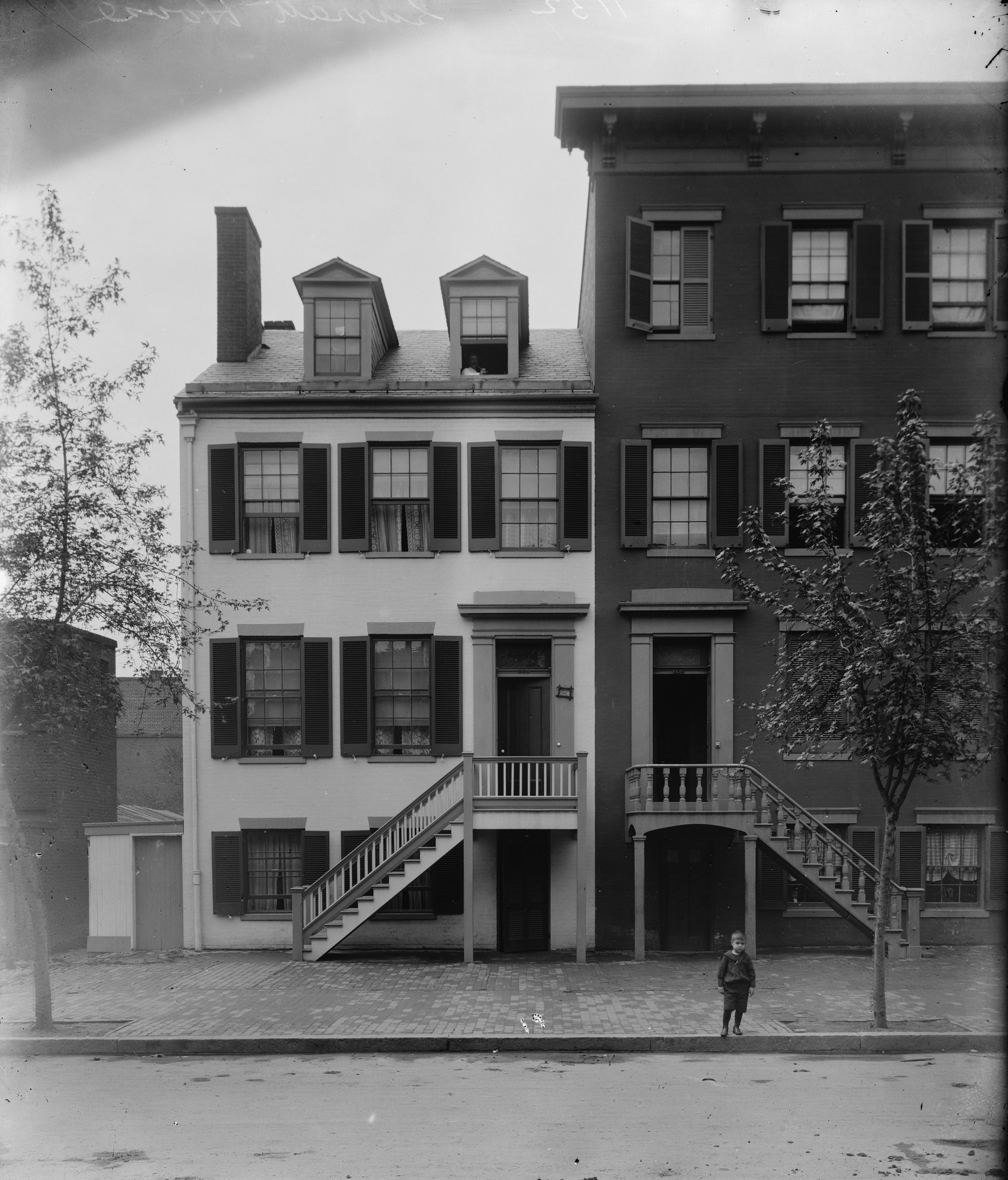
Surratt's boarding house, c. 1890, little changed from how it looked during her occupancy.

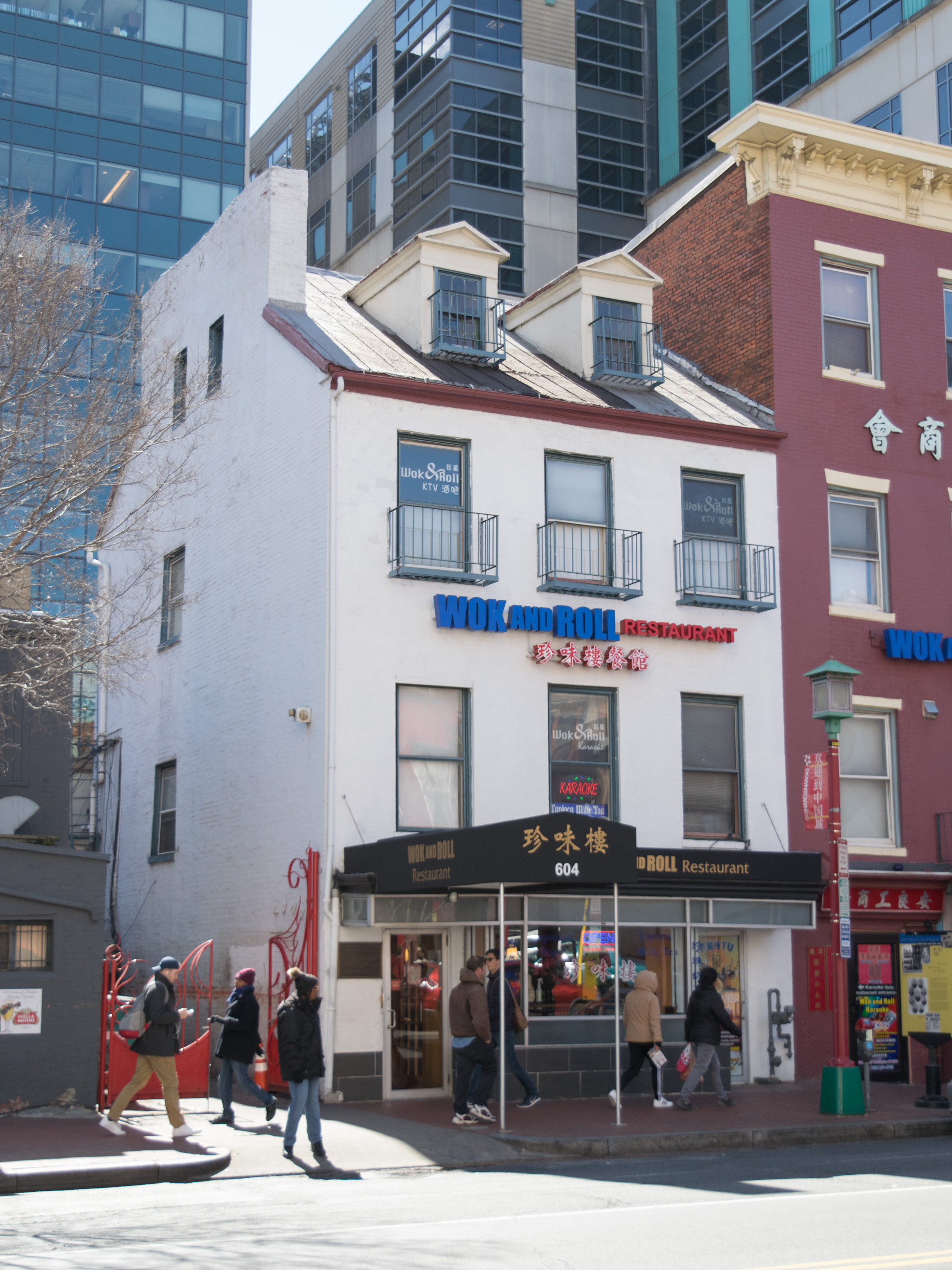
Surratt's boarding house, which now houses a restaurant, is in the Chinatown neighborhood of Washington, D.C.

Louis J. Weichmann moved into Surratt's boarding house on November 1, 1864. On December 23, 1864, Samuel Mudd introduced John Surratt Jr. to John Wilkes Booth. Booth recruited John Jr. into his conspiracy to kidnap Lincoln. Confederate agents began frequenting the boarding house. Booth visited the boarding house many times over the next few months, sometimes at Mary's request.

George Atzerodt and Lewis Powell boarded at the townhouse for short periods. Atzerodt, a friend of both John Jr. and Booth and a co-conspirator in the plot to kidnap Lincoln, visited the boarding house several times in the first two months of 1865. He stayed at the Surratt boarding house in February 1865 (for one night or several, sources differ), but he proved to be a heavy drinker, and Surratt evicted him after just a few days.

He continued to visit the townhouse frequently afterward, however. Powell posed as a Baptist preacher and stayed at the boarding house for three days in March 1865. David Herold also called at the home several times.

As part of the plot to kidnap Lincoln in March 1865, John, Atzerodt, and Herold hid two Spencer carbines, ammunition, and some other supplies at the Surratt tavern in Surrattsville. On April 11, Mary Surratt rented a carriage and drove to the Surratt tavern. She said that she made the trip to collect a debt owed her by a former neighbor. However, according to her tenant, John Lloyd, Surratt told him to get the "shooting irons" ready to be picked up. On April 14, Surratt said that she would once again visit the family tavern in Surrattsville to collect a debt. Shortly before she left the city, Booth visited the boarding house and spoke privately with her. He gave her a package, later found to contain binoculars, for Lloyd to pick up later that evening. Surratt did so and, according to Lloyd, again told Lloyd to have the "shooting irons" ready for pickup and handed him a wrapped package from Booth.

Booth's plan was to assassinate Lincoln and have Atzerodt kill Vice President Andrew Johnson and Powell kill Secretary of State William H. Seward. Booth killed Lincoln, Atzerodt never attempted to kill Johnson, and Powell stabbed Seward repeatedly but failed to murder him. As they fled the city after Lincoln's assassination, Booth and Herold picked up the rifles and binoculars from Surratt's tavern. Lloyd repaired a broken spring on Surratt's wagon before they left.

== Arrest and incarceration ==
Around 2 a.m. on April 15, 1865, members of the District of Columbia police visited the Surratt boarding house, seeking John Wilkes Booth and John Surratt. Why the police came to the house is not entirely clear. Most historians conclude that Weichmann's friend, Department of War employee Daniel Gleason, had alerted federal authorities to Confederate activity centered on the Surratt house, but that does not explain why police rather than federal agents appeared there. (Historian Roy Chamlee, however, says that there is evidence that Gleason did not tell police about his suspicions of Weichmann for several days.) Within 45 minutes of the attack on Lincoln, John Surratt's name had become associated with the attack on Secretary of State William H. Seward. The police as well as the Provost Marshal's office both had files on John Surratt Jr. and knew he was a close friend of Booth. (It is possible that either James L. Maddox, property supervisor at Ford's Theatre and a friend of Booth's, or actor John Matthews, both of whom may have known about the plot to attack government officials, mentioned Surratt's name.) Historian Otto Eisenschiml has argued that David Herold's attempt to steal a horse from John Fletcher may have led them to the Surratt boarding house, but at least one other scholar has called the link uncertain. Other sources claim that eyewitnesses had identified Booth as Lincoln's attacker, and the detectives had information (a tip from an unnamed actor and a bartender) linking John Jr. to Booth. Mary lied to the detectives that her son had been in Canada for two weeks. She also did not reveal that she had delivered a package to the tavern on Booth's behalf only hours earlier.

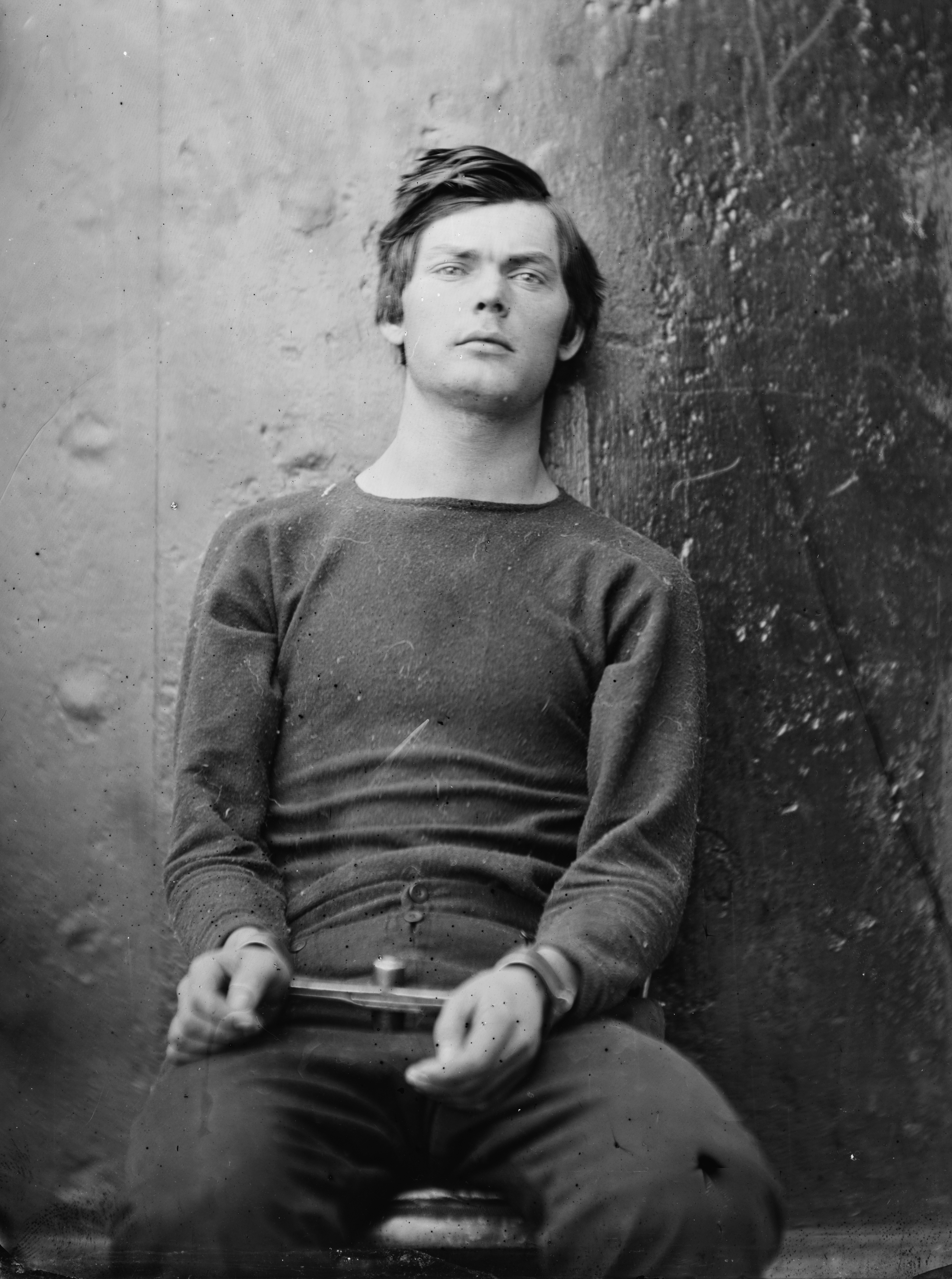
Co-conspirator Lewis Powell's untimely arrival at the Surratt boarding house on April 17 convinced many of Mary Surratt's guilt.

On April 17, a Surratt neighbor told U.S. military authorities that he overheard one of the Surratt's servants saying that three men had come to the house on the night of Lincoln's assassination and that one of the men had mentioned Booth in a theater. (The servant was mistaken about the date, as John Surratt Jr. had indeed been in Elmira, New York, on a mission for a Confederate general). Other pieces of information also mentioned the boarding house as a key meeting place of the possible conspirators. Either Colonel Henry H. Wells, Provost Marshal (head of the military police) of the District of Columbia, or General Christopher C. Augur told Colonel Henry Steel Olcott to arrest everyone in the house.

Federal soldiers visited the Surratt boarding house again late on the evening of April 17. John Jr. could not be found, but after a search of the house, the agents found in Mary's room a picture of Booth, hidden behind another photograph, pictures of Confederate leaders including Jefferson Davis, a pistol, a mold for making bullets, and percussion caps. As Mary was being arrested for conspiracy to assassinate Lincoln, Powell appeared at her door in disguise. Although Surratt denied knowing him, Powell claimed that he was a laborer hired by Surratt to dig a ditch the next morning. The discrepancy and Powell's remarkably well-dressed and -groomed appearance, quite unlike a ditch-digger, prompted his arrest. He was later identified as the man who had attempted to assassinate Secretary of State William Seward.

After her arrest, she was held at an annex to the Old Capitol Prison before being transferred to the Washington Arsenal on April 30. Two armed guards stood before the door to her cell from the beginning of her imprisonment until her death. Her cell, while airy and larger than the others, was sparsely furnished, with a straw mattress, table, wash basin, chair, and a bucket. Food was served four times a day, always of bread; salt pork, beef, or beef soup; and coffee or water. The other arrested conspirators each had their heads enclosed in a padded canvas bag to prevent a suicide attempt. Sources disagree as to whether Surratt was also forced to wear it. Although the others wore iron manacles on their feet and ankles, she was not manacled. (Rumors to the contrary were raised by reporters at the trial who could not see her or "heard" the clank of chains about her feet. The rumors were repeatedly investigated and denied.) She began to suffer menstrual bleeding and became weak during her detention. She was given a rocking chair and allowed visits from her daughter, Anna. She and Powell received the most attention from the press. The Northern press was also highly critical of her, claiming that she had a "criminal face" due to her small mouth and dark eyes.

John Surratt Jr. was in Elmira at the time of the assassination, delivering messages on behalf of a Confederate general. After learning of Lincoln's death, he fled to Montreal, Quebec, Canada.

== Trial ==
The trial for the alleged conspirators began on May 9. A military tribunal, rather than a civilian court, was chosen as the venue because government officials thought that its more lenient rules of evidence would enable the court to get to the bottom of what was then perceived by the public as a vast conspiracy. All eight alleged conspirators were tried simultaneously. Historians have conflicting views regarding Surratt's innocence. Historian Laurie Verge commented, "Only in the case of Dr. Samuel Alexander Mudd is there as much controversy as to the guilt or innocence of one of the defendants." Lincoln assassination scholar Thomas Reed Turner says that of the eight people accused of plotting to kill Lincoln, the case against Surratt remains "the most controversial... at that time and since."

A room on the northeast corner of the third floor of the Arsenal was made into a courtroom, and the prisoners were brought into the room through a side door, which prevented them from passing by or being harassed by spectators. Surratt was given special considerations during the trial because of her illness and sex. In the courtroom, she sat apart from the other prisoners. Sources differ as to whether an armed guard sat on either side of her, as was done for other prisoners during the trial. While the others wore wrist and ankle manacles in the courtroom, she did not. She was also permitted a bonnet, fan, and veil to hide her face from spectators. As her illness worsened during the trial, she was moved to a larger and more comfortable prison cell.

Surratt was charged with abetting, aiding, concealing, counseling, and harboring her co-defendants. The federal government initially attempted to find legal counsel for her and the others, but almost no attorneys were willing to take the job for fear they would be accused of disloyalty to the Union. Surratt retained Reverdy Johnson as her legal counsel. A member of the military commission trying the conspirators challenged Johnson's right to defend Surratt, as he had objected to requiring loyalty oaths from voters in the 1864 presidential election. After much discussion, this objection was withdrawn, but damage had been done to his influence, and he did not attend most of the court sessions. Most of Surratt's legal defense was presented by two other lawyers: Frederick Aiken and John Wesley Clampitt.

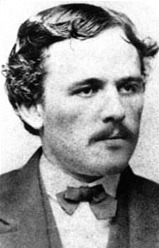
Louis J. Weichmann's testimony proved critical in convicting Mary Surratt.

The prosecution's strategy was to tie Surratt to the conspiracy. Powell's arrival at her boarding house, three days after the president's murder, was critical evidence against her, the government argued. The prosecution presented nine witnesses, but most of their case rested on the testimony of just two men: John M. Lloyd and Louis J. Weichmann. Lloyd testified on May 13 and 15, 1865 on the hiding of the carbines and other supplies at the tavern in March and the two conversations he had with her in which she told him to get the "shooting irons" ready. Weichmann's testimony was important, as it established an intimate relationship between her and the other conspirators.

Weichmann testified May 16 to 19 and said that he had resided at the boarding house since November 1864. He had seen or overheard John Jr. meeting and talking with Atzerodt, Booth, and Powell many times over the past four and a half months. Weichmann had driven Surratt to the tavern on April 11 and 14, confirmed that she and Lloyd had spent much time in private conversation, testified that he saw Booth give her the package of binoculars, and attested that she had turned the package over to Lloyd. Weichmann also testified at length about the Surratt family's ties to the Confederate spy and courier rings operating in the area and their relationships with Atzerodt and Powell. He also testified about the December 23 meeting with Booth and John (which he also attended) and their subsequent meeting with Booth at Booth's room at the National Hotel. Finally, he told the military tribunal about the general excitement in the boarding house in March 1865 after the failed attempt to kidnap Lincoln.

Other prosecution witnesses reinforced Weichmann's testimony. Lodger Honora Fitzpatrick confirmed visits by Atzerodt, Booth, and Powell to the boarding house. Emma Offut, Lloyd's sister-in-law, testified that she saw (but did not hear) Surratt speaking for long periods of time with Lloyd on April 11 and 14. Government agents testified about their arrest of Surratt, Powell's arrival, and her denial that she knew Powell. The fact that Powell sought refuge in the boarding house after Lincoln's murder left a bad impression of her. Surratt's refusal (or failure) to recognize him also weighed against her. The agents also testified about their search of the house, and the evidence (the photographs, the weapons, etc.) discovered there. Lloyd's testimony was the most important for the prosecution's case, for it indicated that she had played an active role in the conspiracy in the days before Lincoln's death. The prosecution rested its case on May 22.

The defense strategy was to impeach the testimony of the key prosecution witnesses: Lloyd and Weichmann. It also wished to show that she was loyal to the Union, her trips to Surrattsville were of an innocent nature, and she had not been aware of Booth's plans. There were 31 witnesses who testified for the defense. George H. Calvert testified that he had pressed Surratt to pay a debt, Bennett Gwynn said Surratt had sought payment from John Nothey to satisfy the Calvert debt, and Nothey agreed that he had received a letter from Surratt for him to appear at the tavern on April 11 to pay what was owed. Several witnesses impugned Lloyd's character by testifying about his alcoholism, while others said he was too intoxicated on the day of Lincoln's assassination to remember that day clearly. Augustus Howell, a Confederate agent, testified that Weichmann was an untrustworthy witness, as he had sought to become a Confederate spy himself. (The prosecution had attempted to show that Howell was a Confederate spy and should not be trusted.)

Anna Surratt testified that it was Weichmann who had brought Atzerodt into the boarding house, that the photograph of Booth was hers, and that she owned photographs of Union political and military leaders. Anna denied ever overhearing any discussions of disloyal activities or ideas in the boarding house, and that Booth's visits to the house were always short. Anna explained her mother's failure to recognize Powell by asserting she could not see well. Augusta Howell, a former servant, and Honora Fitzpatrick, a former slave, testified to Mary's poor eyesight as well. The former servant and the former slave both said Surratt had given Union soldiers food. Numerous witnesses were called at the end of the defense's case to testify to her loyalty to the Union, her deep Christian faith, and her kindness. During the prosecution's rebuttal, government lawyers called four witnesses to the stand, who testified as to Weichmann's unimpeachable character.

Johnson and Aiken presented the closing arguments for the defense. Johnson attacked the jurisdiction of a military tribunal over civilians, as had Mudd's attorney. Aiken also challenged the court's jurisdiction. He also reiterated that Lloyd and Weichmann were unreliable witnesses and that the evidence against her was all circumstantial. The only evidence linking Surratt to the conspiracy to kill Lincoln, he said, came from Lloyd and Weichmann, and neither man was telling the truth. (Dorothy Kunhardt has written that there is evidence the latter's perjured testimony was suborned by Secretary of War Edwin M. Stanton.)

Judge Advocate John Bingham presented the closing argument for the prosecution. The military tribunal had jurisdiction, he said, not only because the court itself had ruled at the beginning of the trials that it did but because they were crimes committed in a military zone, during a time of war, and against high government officials in carrying out treasonous activities. Bingham pointed out that the Surratt boarding house was where the conspiracy was planned, and Atzerodt, Booth, and Powell had all met with Surratt. Booth had paid for the rental of the carriage that took Surratt to Surrattsville each time, and Bingham said that was evidence that Surratt's trips were critical to the conspiracy. Bingham also said that Lloyd's testimony had been corroborated by others and that his unwillingness to reveal the cache of weapons in the tavern was prompted by his subservient tenant relationship to Surratt. Bingham concluded by reiterating the government's key point: Powell had returned to the Surratt house seeking Surratt, and that alone was proof of her guilt. Bingham also pointed out for the tribunal that the charge a person was indicted for was irrelevant. Under the law of conspiracy, if one person carries out a crime, all conspirators are guilty of the same crime.

The trial ended on June 28, 1865. Surratt was so ill the last four days of the trial that she was permitted to stay in her cell. In the opinion of historian Roy Z. Chamlee, both legal teams appeared to have flaws in their cases, and except for Reverdy Johnson, neither team employed highly skilled attorneys. The government's case was hindered by its failure to call as a witness the man who shared Lloyd's carriage when he talked with Surratt and could have verified Lloyd's version of the "shooting irons" story or Metropolitan Police Chief A.C. Richards whose investigation had had the most success in the early days of the investigation. The government did not fully investigate Booth's meetings with Surratt at noon or the evening of the murder, and its questioning and cross-examination of witnesses was poorly prepared and weak. What is most important, according to historian Roy Z. Chamber Jr., is that the government had botched the attempt to apprehend John Jr. The defense's case, too, had a problem. The defense never followed up on inconsistencies in Weichmann's chronology of Mary's last visit to the tavern, which could have entirely undermined Weichmann's credibility.

A newspaper drawing of Surratt receiving comfort from one of the priests permitted to visit her in her prison cell.

The military tribunal considered guilt and sentencing on June 29 and 30. Surratt's guilt was the second-last to be considered, as her case had problems of evidence and witness reliability. The sentence was handed down on June 30. The military tribunal found her guilty on all charges but two. A death sentence required six of the nine votes of the judges. Surratt was sentenced to death, the first woman executed by the federal government. The sentence was announced publicly on July 5. When Powell learned of his sentence, he declared that she was completely innocent of all charges. The night before the execution, Surratt's priests and Anna Surratt both visited Powell and elicited from him a strong statement declaring Mary innocent. Although it was delivered to Captain Christian Rath, who was overseeing the execution, Powell's statement had no effect on anyone with authority to prevent Surratt's death. George Atzerodt bitterly condemned her, implicating her even further in the conspiracy. Powell's was the only statement by any conspirator exonerating Surratt.

Anna Surratt pleaded repeatedly for her mother's life with Judge Advocate General Joseph Holt, but he refused to consider clemency. She also attempted to see President Andrew Johnson several times to beg for mercy but was not granted permission to see him.

Five of the nine judges signed a letter asking President Johnson to give Surratt clemency and commute her sentence to life in prison because of her age and sex. Holt did not deliver the recommendation to Johnson until July 5, two days before Surratt and the others were to hang. Johnson signed the order for execution but did not sign the order for clemency. Johnson later said he never saw the clemency request; Holt said he showed it to Johnson, who refused to sign it. Johnson, according to Holt, said in signing the death warrant that she had "kept the nest that hatched the egg."

== Execution ==
Construction of the gallows for the hanging of the conspirators condemned to death began immediately on July 5, after the execution order was signed. It was constructed in the south part of the Arsenal courtyard, was 12 feet (3.7 m) high and about 20 square feet (1.9 m^{2}) in size. Rath, who oversaw the preparations for the executions, made the nooses. Tired of making nooses and thinking that the government would never hang a woman, he made Surratt's noose the night before the execution with five loops rather than the regulation's seven. He tested the nooses that night by tying them to a tree limb and a bag of buckshot and then tossing the bag to the ground (the ropes held). Civilian workers did not want to dig the graves out of superstitious fear, so Rath asked for volunteers among the soldiers at the Arsenal and received more help than he needed.

At noon on July 6, Surratt was informed she would be hanged the next day. She wept profusely. She was joined by two Catholic priests (Jacob Walter and B.F. Wiget) and her daughter Anna. Father Walter remained with her almost until her death. Her menstrual problems had worsened, and she was in such pain and suffered from such severe cramps that the prison doctor gave her wine and medication. She repeatedly asserted her innocence. She spent the night on her mattress, weeping and moaning in pain and grief, ministered to by the priests. Anna left her mother's side at 8 a.m. on July 7 and went to the White House to beg for her mother's life one last time. Her entreaty rejected, she returned to the prison and her mother's cell at about 11 a.m. The soldiers began testing the gallows about 11:25 a.m.; the sound of the tests unnerved all the prisoners. Shortly before noon, Mary Surratt was taken from her cell and then allowed to sit in a chair near the entrance to the courtyard. The heat in the city that day was oppressive. By noon, it had already reached 92.3 °F (33.5 °C). The guards ordered all visitors to leave at 12:30 p.m. When she was forced to part from her mother, Anna's hysterical screams of grief could be heard throughout the prison.

Clampitt and Aiken had not finished trying to save their client, however. On the morning of July 7, they asked a District of Columbia court for a writ of habeas corpus, arguing that the military tribunal had no jurisdiction over their client. The court issued the writ at 3 a.m., and it was served on General Winfield Scott Hancock. Hancock was ordered to produce Surratt by 10 a.m. General Hancock sent an aide to General John F. Hartranft, who commanded the Old Capitol Prison, ordering him not to admit any US marshal, as that would prevent the marshal from serving a similar writ on Hartranft. Johnson was informed that the court had issued the writ and promptly cancelled it at 11:30 a.m. under the authority granted to him by the Habeas Corpus Suspension Act of 1863. General Hancock and United States Attorney General James Speed personally appeared in court and informed the judge of the cancellation of the writ.

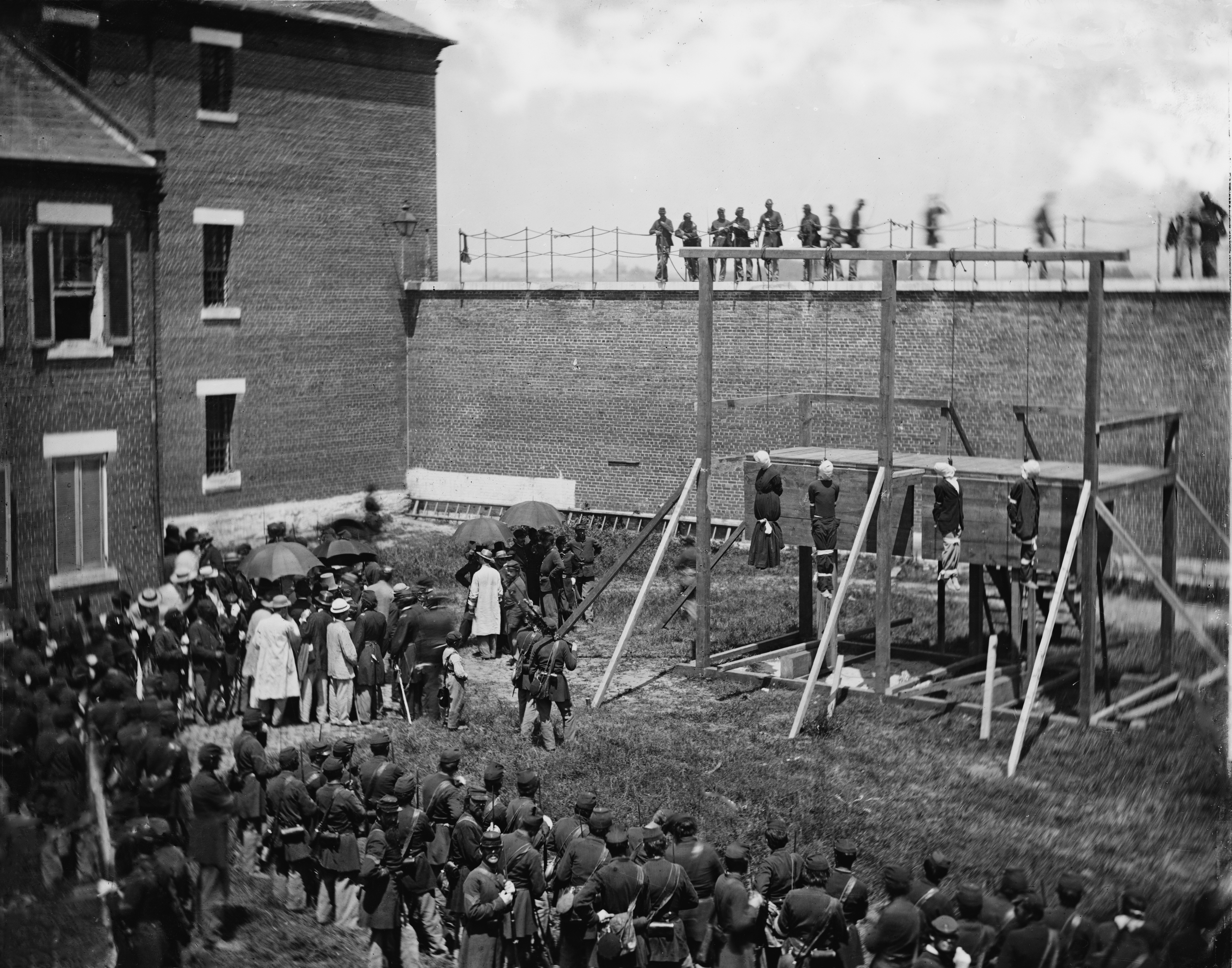
Aftermath of the execution of Mary Surratt, Lewis Powell, David Herold, and George Atzerodt on July 7, 1865.

On July 7, 1865, at 1:15 p.m., a procession led by General Hartranft escorted the four condemned prisoners through the courtyard and up the steps to the gallows. Each prisoner's ankles and wrists were bound by manacles. Surratt led the way, wearing a black bombazine dress, black bonnet, and black veil. More than 1,000 people, including government officials, members of the US armed forces, friends and family of the accused, official witnesses, and reporters, watched. General Hancock limited attendance to those who had a ticket, and only those who had a good reason to be present were given a ticket. Most of those present were military officers and soldiers, as fewer than 200 tickets had been printed.

Alexander Gardner, who had photographed the body of Booth and taken portraits of several of the male conspirators while they were imprisoned aboard naval ships, photographed the execution for the government. Hartranft read the order for their execution. Surratt, either weak from her illness or swooning in fear (perhaps both), had to be supported by two soldiers and her priests. The condemned were seated in chairs, Surratt almost collapsing into hers. She was seated to the right of the others, the traditional "seat of honor" in an execution. White cloth was used to bind their arms to their sides and their ankles and thighs together. The cloths around Surratt's legs were tied around her dress below the knees. Each person was ministered to by a member of the clergy. From the scaffold, Powell said, "Mrs. Surratt is innocent. She doesn't deserve to die with the rest of us." Fathers Walter and Wiget prayed over her and held a crucifix to her lips. About 16 minutes elapsed from the time the prisoners entered the courtyard until they were ready for execution.

Surratt's bonnet was removed, and the noose put around her neck by a U.S. Secret Service officer. A white bag was placed over the head of each prisoner after the noose was put in place. She complained that the bindings about her arms hurt, and the officer preparing said, "Well, it won't hurt long." Finally, the prisoners were asked to stand and move forward a few feet to the nooses. The chairs were removed. Her last words, spoken to a guard as he moved her forward to the drop, were "Please don't let me fall."

Surratt and the others stood on the drop for about 10 seconds, and then Captain Rath clapped his hands. Four soldiers of Company F of the 14th Veteran Reserves knocked out the supports holding the drops in place, and the condemned fell. Surratt, who had moved forward enough to barely step onto the drop, lurched forward and slid partway down the drop, her body snapping tight at the end of the rope, swinging back and forth. She appeared to die relatively quickly with little struggle.

== Burial ==
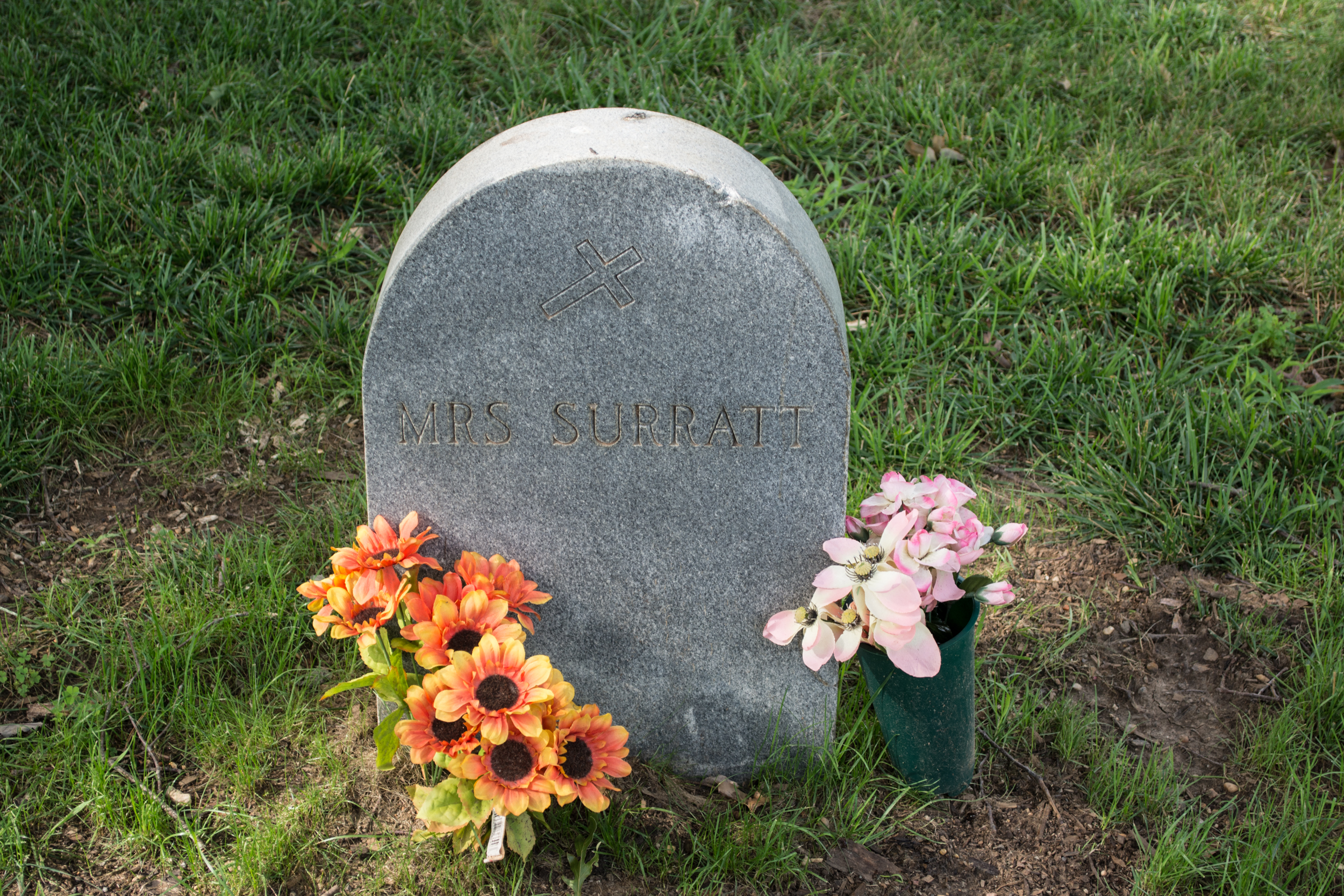
Grave of Mary Surratt (with modern headstone) at Mount Olivet Cemetery.

Each body was inspected by a physician to ensure that death had occurred. The bodies of the executed were allowed to hang for about 30 minutes and soldiers began to cut them down at 1:53 p.m. A corporal raced to the top of the gallows and cut down Atzerodt's body, which fell to the ground with a thud. He was reprimanded, and the other bodies were cut down more gently. Herold's body was next, followed by Powell's. Surratt's body was cut down at 1:58 p.m. As Surratt's body was cut loose, her head fell forward. A soldier joked, "She makes a good bow" and was rebuked by an officer for his poor use of humor.

Upon examination, the military surgeons determined that no one's neck had been broken by the fall. The manacles and cloth bindings were removed but not the white execution masks, and the bodies were placed into the pine coffins. The name of each person was written on a piece of paper by acting Assistant Adjutant R. A. Watts, and inserted in a glass vial, which was placed into the coffin. The coffins were buried against the prison wall in shallow graves, just a few feet from the gallows. A white picket fence marked the burial site. The night that she died, a mob attacked the Surratt boarding house and began stripping it of souvenirs until the police stopped them.

Anna Surratt unsuccessfully asked for her mother's body for four years. In 1867, the War Department decided to tear down the portion of the Washington Arsenal where the bodies of Surratt and the other executed conspirators lay. On October 1, 1867, the coffins were disinterred and reburied in Warehouse No. 1 at the Arsenal, with a wooden marker placed at the head of each burial vault. Booth's body lay alongside them. In February 1869, Edwin Booth asked Johnson for the body of his brother. Johnson agreed to turn the body over to the Booth family, and on February 8 Surratt's body was turned over to the Surratt family. She was buried in Mount Olivet Cemetery in Washington, D.C., on February 9, 1869. Lloyd is buried 100 yards (91 m) from her grave in the same cemetery.

== Surviving family and home ==
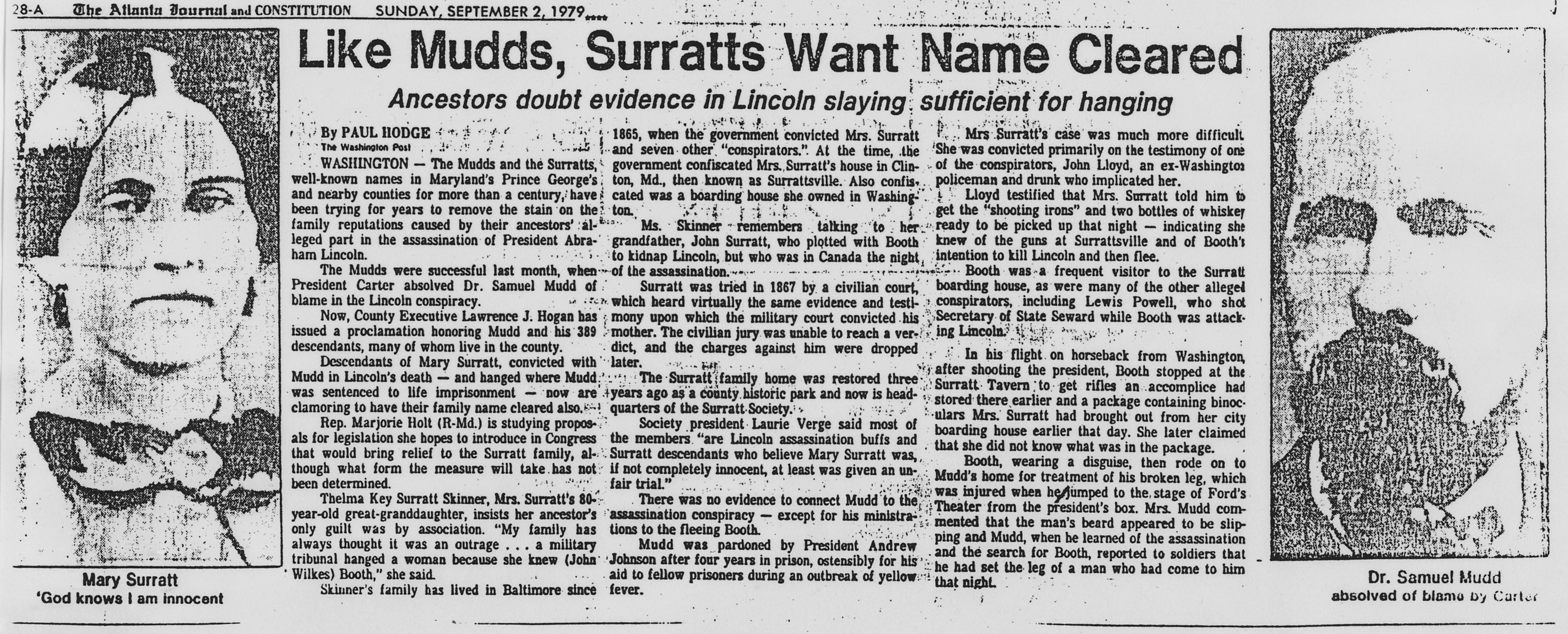
"Like Mudds, Surratts Want Name Cleared", The Atlanta Journal-Constitution Sunday, September 2, 1979

Anna Surratt moved from the townhouse on H Street and lived with friends for a few years, ostracized from society. She married William Tonry, a government clerk. They lived in poverty for a while after he was dismissed from his job, but in time, he became a professor of chemistry in Baltimore and the couple became better off. The strain of her mother's death left Anna mentally unbalanced, and she suffered from periods of extreme fear that bordered on insanity. She died in 1904.

After the dismissal of charges against him, John Jr. married and he and his family lived in Baltimore near his sister, Anna. He had seven children, the only one of Mary's children with issue.

Isaac Surratt also returned to the United States and lived in Baltimore. He died unmarried in 1907. Isaac and Anna were buried on either side of their mother in Mount Olivet Cemetery. John Jr. was buried in Baltimore in 1916. In 1968, a new headstone with a brass plaque replaced the old, defaced headstone over Mary Surratt's grave.

Mary Surratt's boarding house still stands and was listed on the National Register of Historic Places in 2009. Those interested in Mary Surratt formed the Surratt Society. The Surrattsville tavern and house are historical sites run today by the Maryland National Capital Parks and Planning Commission as a historic house museum. The Washington Arsenal is now Fort Lesley J. McNair.

== Portrayals ==
Surratt was portrayed by actress Virginia Gregg in the 1956 episode "The Mary Surratt Case," telecast as part of the NBC anthology series The Joseph Cotten Show. She was portrayed by Robin Wright in the 2011 film The Conspirator, which was directed by Robert Redford. She was portrayed by Carrie Lazar in the 2024 television series Manhunt by showrunner Monica Beletsky.

== Sources ==
- Boritt, G.S. and Forness, Norman O. The Historian's Lincoln: Pseudohistory, Psychohistory, and History. Urbana, Ill.: University of Illinois Press, 1996.
- Bryer, Jackson R. New Essays on F. Scott Fitzgerald's Neglected Stories. Columbia, Mo.: University of Missouri Press, 1996.
- Buchanan, Paul D. The American Women's Rights Movement: A Chronology of Events and of Opportunities From 1600 to 2008. Boston: Branden Books, 2009.
- Bucklee, Sally Mitchell. A Church and Its Village: St. Philip's Episcopal Church, Laurel, Maryland. Baltimore, Md.: Gateway Press, 2001.
- Busch, Francis X. Enemies of the state: An Account of the Trials of the Mary Eugenia Surrat Case, the Teapot Dome Cases, the Alphonse Capone Case and the Rosenburg Case. Indianapolis: Bobbs-Merrill, 1954.
- Cashin, Joan. The War Was You and Me: Civilians in the American Civil War. Princeton, N.J.: Princeton Univ. Press, 2002.
- Chaconas, Joan L. "John H. Surratt Jr." In The Trial: The Assassination of President Lincoln and the Trial of the Conspirators. Lexington, Ky.: University Press of Kentucky, 2003.
- Chamlee Jr., Roy Z. Lincoln's Assassins: A Complete Account of Their Capture, Trial, and Punishment. Jefferson, N.C.: McFarland & Co., 1989.
- Commire, Anne and Klezmer, Deborah. Women in World History: A Biographical Encyclopedia. Waterford, Conn.: Yorkin Publications, 2001.
- DeWitt, David Miller The Judicial Murder of Mary E. Surratt. J. Murphy & Co., 1894.
- Eisenschiml, Otto. Why Was Lincoln Murdered? New York: Grosset & Dunlap, 1937.
- Evans, Eli N. Judah P. Benjamin, the Jewish Confederate. New York: Simon and Schuster, 1989.
- Federal Writers' Project. Washington, D.C.: A Guide to the Nation's Capital. New York: Hastings House, 1942.
- Fishel, Edwin C. Secret War for the Union. New York: Houghton Mifflin, 1996.
- Gamber, Wendy. The Boardinghouse in Nineteenth-Century America. Baltimore: Johns Hopkins University Press, 2007.
- Gillespie, L. Kay. Executed Women of the 20th and 21st Centuries. Lanham, Md.: University Press of America, 2009.
- Goodrich, Thomas. The Darkest Dawn: Lincoln, Booth, and the Great American Tragedy. Bloomington, Ind.: Indiana University Press, 2005.
- Griffin, John Chandler. Abraham Lincoln's Execution. Gretna, La.: Pelican Publishing Co., 2006.
- Harris, Thomas Mealey. Assassination of Lincoln: A History of the Great Conspiracy, Trial of the Conspirators by a Military Commission, and a Review of the Trial of John H. Surratt. Boston: American Citizen Company, 1892.
- Hartranft, John F.; Steers, Edward; and Holzer, Harold. The Lincoln Assassination Conspirators: Their Confinement and Execution, As Recorded in the Letterbook of John Frederick Hartranft. Baton Rouge: Louisiana State University Press, 2009.
- Heidler, David Stephen; Heidler, Jeanne T.; and Coles, David J. Encyclopedia of the American Civil War: A Political, Social, and Military History. New York: W.W. Norton & Co., 2000.
- Isacsson, Alfred. The Travels, Arrest and Trial of John H. Surratt. Middletown, N.Y.: Vestigium Press, 2003.
- James, Edward T. Notable American Women: A Biographical Dictionary. Cambridge, Mass.: Belknap Press of Harvard University Press, 2004.
- Jampoler, Andrew C.A. The Last Lincoln Conspirator: John Surratt's Flight From the Gallows. Annapolis, Md.: Naval Institute Press, 2008.
- Johnson, Andrew. The Papers of Andrew Johnson: September 1868 – April 1869. Paul H. Bergeron, ed. Knoxville, Tenn.: University of Tennessee Press, 1999.
- Johnson, Scott Patrick. Trials of the Century: An Encyclopedia of Popular Culture and the Law. Santa Barbara, Calif.: ABC-CLIO, 2011.
- Jones, John P. Dr. Mudd and the Lincoln Assassination: The Case Reopened. Conshohocken, Pa.: Combined Books, 1995.
- Jordan, David M. Winfield Scott Hancock: A Soldier's Life. Bloomington, Ind.: Indiana University Press, 1988.
- Katz, D. Mark. Witness to an Era: The Life and Photographs of Alexander Gardner: The Civil War, Lincoln, and the West. New York: Viking, 1991.
- Kauffman, Michael W. American Brutus. New York: Random House, 2004. ISBN 0-375-50785-X
- Klement, Frank. Lincoln's Critics: The Copperheads of the North. Shippensburg, W.Va.: White Mane Books, 1999.
- Kuhn, Annette. Queen of the 'B's: Ida Lupino Behind the Camera. Westport, Conn.: Greenwood Press, 1995.
- Kunhardt, Philip B.; Kunhardt, Peter W. (2008). Looking for Lincoln: The Making of an American Icon. New York: Alfred A. Knopf. ISBN 9780307267139.
- Larson, Kate Clifford. The Assassin's Accomplice: Mary Surratt and the Plot to Kill Abraham Lincoln. Basic Books, 2008. ISBN 978-0-465-03815-2
- Latimer, Christopher P. Civil Liberties and the State: A Documentary and Reference Guide. Santa Barbara, Calif.: Greenwood, 2011.
- Leonard, Elizabeth D. Lincoln's Avengers: Justice, Revenge, and Reunion After the Civil War. New York: Norton, 2004.
- MacHenry, Robert. Liberty's Women. Springfield, Mass.: G.C. Merriam Co., 1980.
- Miller, Edward A. Lincoln's Abolitionist General: The Biography of David Hunter. Columbia, S.C.: University of South Carolina Press, 1997.
- Morseberger, Robert E. and Morsberger, Katharine M. Lew Wallace, Militant Romantic. New York: McGraw-Hill, 1980.
- Oldroyd, Osborn H. The Assassination of Abraham Lincoln: Flight, Pursuit, Capture, and Punishment of the Conspirators. Washington, D.C.: O.H. Oldroyd, 1901.
- Ownsbey, Betty J. Alias 'Paine': Lewis Thorthon Powell, the Mystery Man of the Lincoln Conspiracy. Jefferson, N.C.: McFarland & Company, 2006.
- Phelps, Shirelle. World of Criminal Justice, Vol. 2: N-Z. Detroit: Gale Group, 2001.
- Phillips, Larissa. Women Civil War Spies of the Confederacy. New York: Rosen Publishing Group, 2004.
- Pittman, Benn. The Assassination of President Lincoln and the Trial of the Conspirators. Cincinnati: Moore, Wilstach & Baldwin, 1865.
- Rehnquist, William H. All the Laws But One: Civil Liberties in Wartime. New York: Vintage Books, 2000.
- Roscoe, Theodore. The Web of Conspiracy: The Complete Story of the Men Who Murdered Abraham Lincoln. Englewood Cliffs, N.J.: Prentice-Hall, 1959.
- Sachsman, David B.; Rushing, S. Kittrell; and Morris, Roy. Seeking A Voice: Images of Race and Gender in the 19th Century Press. West Lafayette, Ind.: Purdue University Press, 2009.
- Schroeder-Lein, Glenna R. and Zuczek, Richard. Andrew Johnson: A Biographical Companion. Santa Barbara, Calif.: ABC-CLIO, 2001.
- Steers Jr., Edward. Blood on the Moon. Lexington: University Press of Kentucky, 2001.
- Steers Jr., Edward. "'Let the Stain of Innocent Blood Be Removed from the Land': The Military Trial of the Lincoln Conspirators." In The Lincoln Assassination: Crime and Punishment, Myth and Memory. Harold Holzer, Craig L. Symonds, and Frank J. Williams, eds. New York: Fordham University Press, 2010.
- Steers Jr., Edward. The Lincoln Assassination Encyclopedia. New York: Harper Perennial, 2010.
- Steers Jr., Edward. Lincoln Legends: Myths, Hoaxes, and Confabulations Associated With Our Greatest President. Lexington, Ky.: University Press of Kentucky, 2007.
- Steers Jr. Edward and Holzer, Harold. The Lincoln Assassination Conspirators: Their Confinement and Execution, as Recorded in the Letterbook of John Frederick Hartranft. Baton Rouge, La.: Louisiana State University Press, 2009.
- Stern, Philip Van Doren. An End to Valor: The Last Days of the Civil War. Boston: Houghton Mifflin, 1958.
- "Surratt, Mary." In The New Encyclopædia Britannica. Chicago: Encyclopædia Britannica, 1998.
- "Surratt, Mary E. Jenkins (1823–1865)." In Women in the American Civil War. Lisa Tendrich Frank, ed. Santa Barbara, Calif.: ABC-CLIO, 2008.
- "Surratt, Mary Eugenia Jenkins (1817–1865)." In Historical Dictionary of Reconstruction. Hans Louis Trefousse, ed. New York: Greenwood Press, 1991.
- Swanson, James L. Manhunt: The Twelve Day Chase for Lincoln's Killer. New York: HarperCollins, 2007. ISBN 0-06-051850-2
- Swanson, James L. and Weinberg, Daniel R. Lincoln's Assassins: Their Trial and Execution. New York: Harper Perennial, 2008.
- Townsend, George Alfred. The Life, Crime and Capture of John Wilkes Booth. New York: Dick and Fitzgerald, Publishers, 1886.
- Townsend, George Alfred. Washington, Outside and Inside: A Picture and a Narrative of the Origin, Growth, Excellencies, Abuses, Beauties, and Personages of Our Governing City. Hartford, Conn.: S.M. Betts & Co., 1874.
- Trindal, Elizabeth Steger. Mary Surratt: An American Tragedy. Pelican Pub. Co., 1996. ISBN 1-56554-185-5
- Turner, Thomas Reed. Beware the People Weeping: Public Opinion and the Assassination of Abraham Lincoln. Baton Rouge: Louisiana State University Press, 1982.
- Van Doren, Charles Lincoln and McHenry, Robert. Webster's American Biographies. Springfield, Mass.: Merriam-Webster, 1984.
- Verge, Laurie. "Mary Elizabeth Surratt". In The Trial: The Assassination of President Lincoln and the Trial of the Conspirators. Lexington, Ky.: University Press of Kentucky, 2003.
- Watts, R.A. "Trial and Execution of the Lincoln Conspirators." Michigan History Magazine. 6:1 (1922).
- Weichmann, Louis J. and Richards, A.C. A True History of the Assassination of Abraham Lincoln and of the Conspiracy of 1865. New York: Knopf, 1975.
- Zanca, Kenneth J.. The Catholics and Mrs. Mary Surratt: How They Responded to the Trial and Execution of the Lincoln Conspirator. University Press of America, 2008. ISBN 0-7618-4023-0
