= David Herold =

Accomplice of John Wilkes Booth (1842–1865)

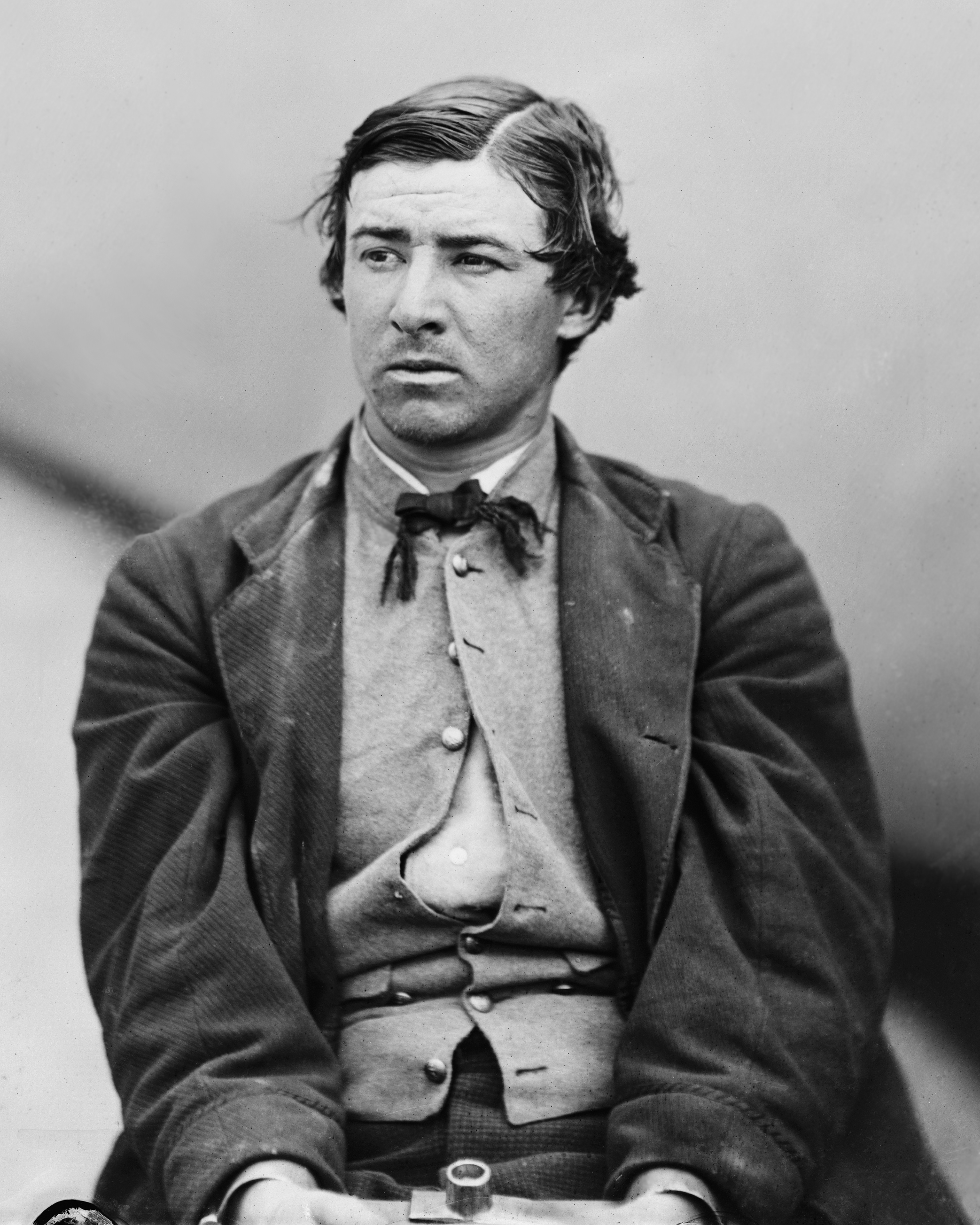
- Herold at the Washington Navy Yard after his arrest (1865)
- Born: David Edgar Herold; June 16, 1842; Maryland, U.S.
- Died: July 7, 1865 (aged 23); Arsenal Penitentiary, Washington, D.C., U.S.
- Resting place: Congressional Cemetery
- Occupation: Pharmacist's assistant
- Status: Executed by hanging
- Conviction: Conspiracy to assassinate Abraham Lincoln
- Penalty: Death

David Edgar Herold (June 16, 1842 – July 7, 1865) was an American pharmacist's assistant and accomplice of John Wilkes Booth in the assassination of Abraham Lincoln on April 14, 1865. After the shooting, Herold accompanied Booth to the home of Samuel Mudd, who set Booth's injured leg.

The two men then continued their escape through Maryland and into Virginia, and Herold remained with Booth until the authorities cornered them in a barn. Herold surrendered, but Booth was shot to death by Sergeant Boston Corbett. Herold was tried by a military tribunal, sentenced to death for conspiracy, and hanged with three other conspirators at the Washington Arsenal, now known as Fort Lesley J. McNair.

== Early life ==
David E. Herold was born in Maryland, the sixth of eleven children of Adam George Herold and Mary Ann Porter. Adam and Mary were married on November 9, 1828, in Washington, D.C. David was their only son to survive to adulthood. His father Adam was the Chief Clerk of the Naval Storehouse at the Washington Navy Yard for over 20 years. Herold's family was well-off financially and lived in a large brick house at 636 Eighth Street SE in Washington, D.C., near the Washington Navy Yard.

David attended Gonzaga College High School, Georgetown College, Charlotte Hall Military Academy (at Charlotte Hall, St. Mary's County, Maryland), and the Rittenhouse Academy. In 1860 Herold received a certificate in pharmacy from Georgetown College. He then worked as a pharmacist's assistant and as a clerk for a doctor and was an avid hunter. He became acquainted with John Surratt while attending Charlotte Hall Military Academy classes in the late 1850s. A few years later, in December 1864, Surratt introduced him to John Wilkes Booth.

== Assassination plot ==
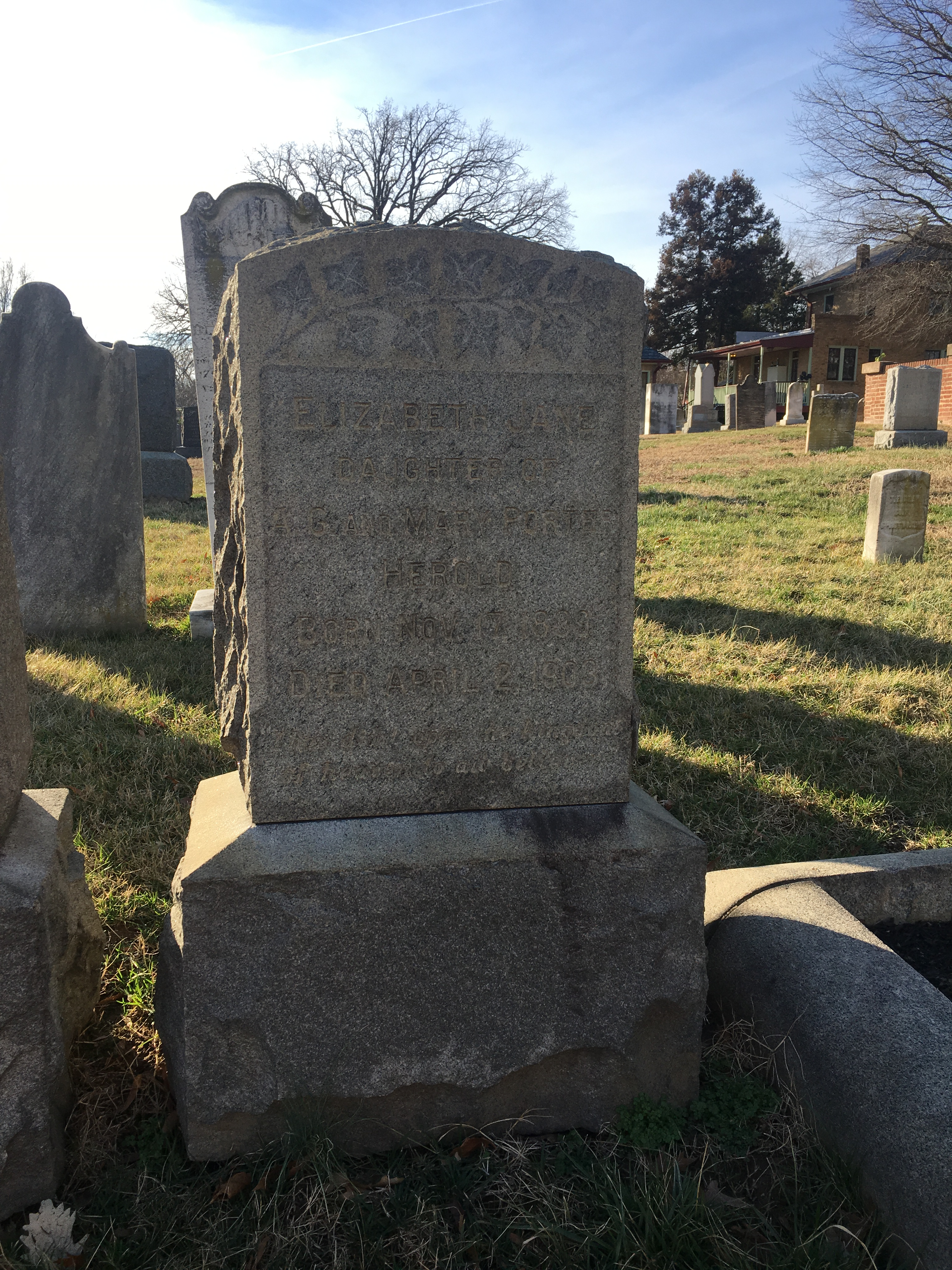
Herold's grave in Congressional Cemetery is marked only by the tombstone of his sister, buried beside him.

Herold and a group of co-conspirators had originally plotted to kidnap Lincoln, but later decided to kill him, Vice President Andrew Johnson, and Secretary of State William H. Seward in a bid to help the Confederacy's cause.

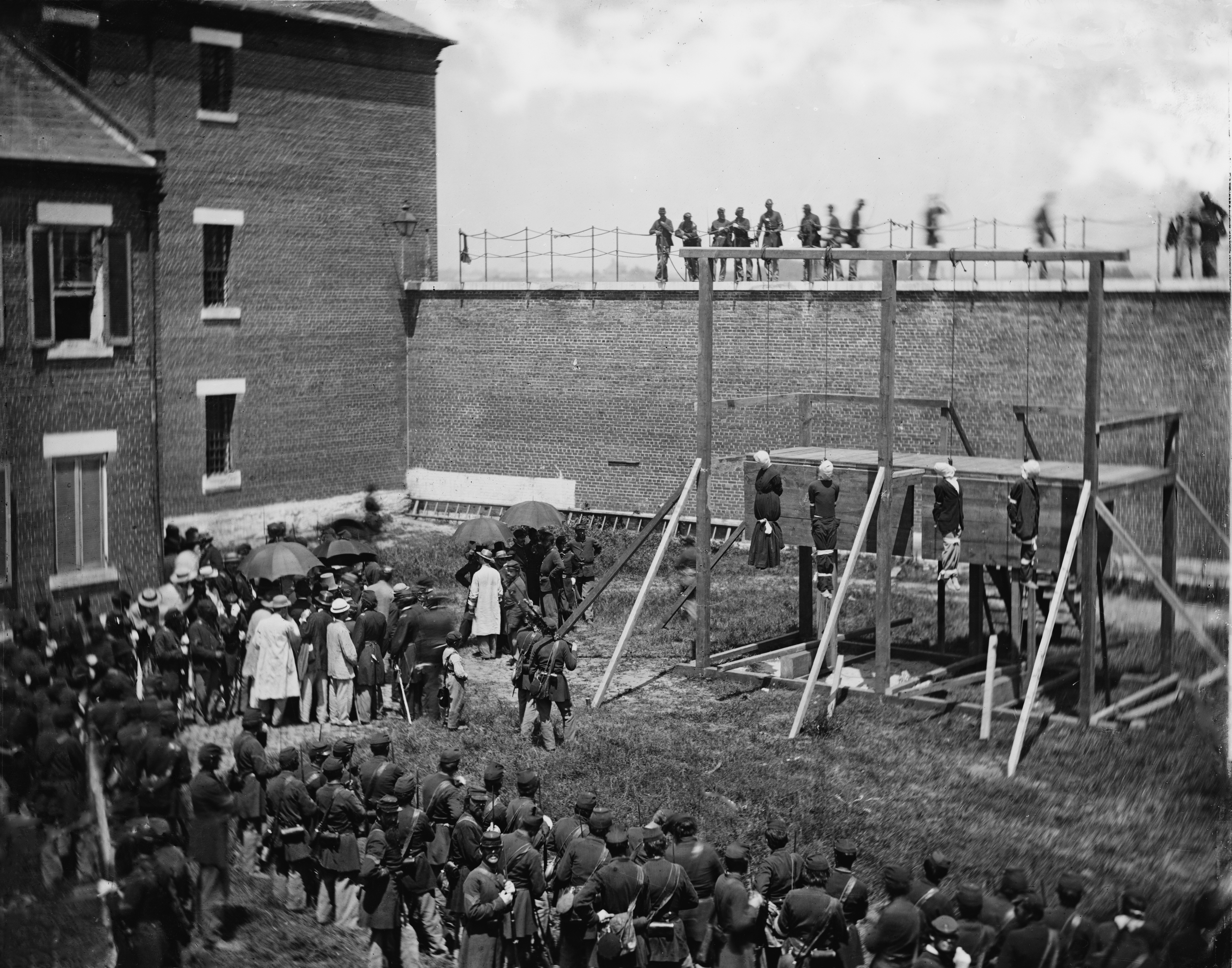
Execution of Mary Surratt, Lewis Powell, David Herold, and George Atzerodt on July 7, 1865, at Fort McNair in Washington, D.C. Digitally restored.

On the night of April 14, 1865, Herold guided Lewis Powell to Seward's house. Inside, Powell attempted to kill Seward, severely wounding him and other members of his household.

The ensuing commotion frightened Herold and he rode off, leaving Powell to fend for himself. Another conspirator, George Atzerodt, was supposed to kill Vice President Andrew Johnson, but instead he got drunk at a bar.

Booth shot Lincoln at Ford's Theater. When he jumped onto the stage after shooting Lincoln in the back of the head, he may have broken his fibula. He fled on horseback across the bridge into Maryland, where he met Herold.

They headed to Surrattsville, Maryland (now Clinton), where they picked up weapons at a tavern owned by Mary Surratt. She had directed that those weapons be left at the tavern for use later on. Booth and Herold went to the home of Samuel Mudd, who set Booth's leg. Mudd let Booth and Herold rest at his home for a few hours. The pair then headed to the house of Samuel Cox, a Confederate sympathizer. He refused to let the two into his house, and insisted that they stay in a thicket behind the house. He brought food, whiskey, and newspapers to Booth and Herold, which is how Booth realized that he was not seen as the hero (like Marcus Junius Brutus) that he longed to be.

After a close encounter with Union soldiers, Herold slaughtered the horses that he and Booth rode, worrying they would give the two away. Cox later gave Booth a skiff to cross the Potomac River. Due to the thick fog, instead of landing in Virginia as planned, Herold and Booth landed in Maryland. They next threatened a farmer and forced him and his family to sleep outside while the assassin and his cohort slept inside the home. They left in the morning and went to a farm owned by Richard Henry Garrett. Unaware of what they had done, Garrett let them stay on his property. After Booth got drunk, Garrett made the two sleep in the tobacco barn. Soon, they woke to the sounds of horses.

Herold and Booth were trapped by Union soldiers on April 26. Herold surrendered, but Booth refused to lay down his arms and was shot by Boston Corbett through a crack in the barn wall. He died a few hours later on the porch of the Garrett house.

== Trial and execution ==
Herold was tried before a military tribunal. As he had already admitted his involvement in the assassination conspiracy, the only defense his lawyer Frederick Stone could offer was that Herold was feeble-minded and under undue influence from Booth. His defense being unsuccessful, Herold was convicted and sentenced to death. He was hanged in Washington, D.C., on July 7, 1865. At first, the fall from the gallows did not break his neck; therefore, he struggled for nearly five minutes before slowly strangling to death.

On February 15, 1869, Herold's mother and five of his sisters interred his remains in Congressional Cemetery in Washington, D.C., in an unmarked grave, next to the grave of his father Adam. The gravestone memorializing David in Congressional Cemetery was placed there in July 1917, at the time of the burial of his sister.

== Cultural references ==
Gore Vidal's fictionalized account of Lincoln's presidency, Lincoln, includes a heavy focus on David Herold. In the Afterword, when Vidal explains the extent to which his novel is true to fact, he writes, "As David's life is largely unknown until Booth's conspiracy, I have invented a low-life for him."

In the Stephen Sondheim musical Assassins, David Herold appears in the song "The Ballad of Booth", in which Booth forces Herold at gunpoint to write why Booth killed Lincoln. However, when soldiers surround the barn where they are hiding, Herold runs.

David Herold is played by Troy Acree in Season 4, Episode 2 of Unsolved Mysteries which dramatizes the conspiracy theory that Booth escaped capture and died in 1903.

In the 2024 series Manhunt, Herold is played by Will Harrison.
