= George Atzerodt =

American assassin (1835–1865)

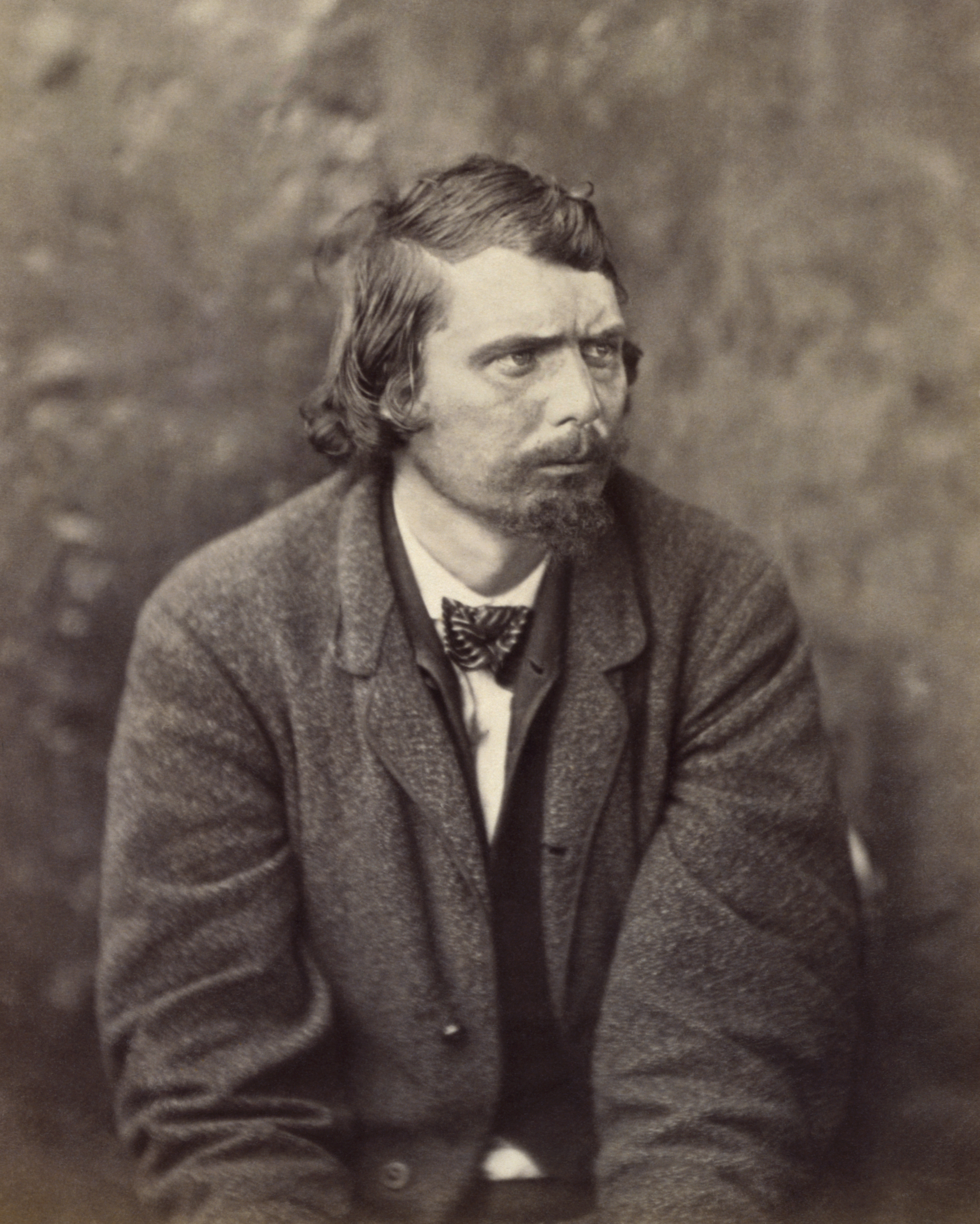
- Atzerodt in 1865
- Born: Georg Andreas Atzerodt; June 12, 1835; Dörna (now in Unstruttal), Saxony, Prussia, German Confederation
- Died: July 7, 1865 (aged 30); Arsenal Penitentiary, Washington, D.C., U.S.
- Resting place: Glenwood Cemetery
- Occupation: Carriage repair business
- Status: Executed by hanging
- Conviction: Conspiracy to assassinate Andrew Johnson
- Penalty: Death

George Andrew Atzerodt (June 12, 1835 – July 7, 1865) was a German-American repairman, Confederate sympathizer, and conspirator in the assassination of U.S. President Abraham Lincoln. He was assigned to assassinate Vice President Andrew Johnson, but lost his nerve and made no attempt. Atzerodt was tried by a military tribunal, sentenced to death for conspiracy, and hanged along with three other conspirators.

== Early life ==
Atzerodt was born in Dörna (now part of Unstruttal), in the Prussian Province of Saxony. He immigrated to the United States in 1843 at the age of eight. As an adult, he opened his own carriage repair business in Port Tobacco, Maryland. Despite having lived in the United States for most of his life, Atzerodt could not speak English fluently.

== Conspiracy ==
In January 1865, some years after opening his failed carriage repair business, Atzerodt was introduced to John Wilkes Booth in Washington, D.C., by John Surratt. Atzerodt was willing to join in Booth's earlier conspiracy to kidnap President Abraham Lincoln, as he later admitted in his trial.

According to the prosecution, Booth assigned Atzerodt to assassinate Vice President Andrew Johnson on April 14, 1865. On that morning, Atzerodt booked room 126 at the Kirkwood House in Washington, where Johnson was staying. At 10:15 P.M. that night, the same moment John Wilkes Booth shot Abraham Lincoln at Ford's Theater, Lewis Powell attacked the already injured Secretary of State William Seward, but Atzerodt could not muster the courage to kill Andrew Johnson. Instead, he began drinking at the hotel bar, becoming heavily intoxicated, and lost his nerve. He spent the rest of the night drunkenly walking the streets of Washington. He dropped his knife in a nearby gutter; a sharp-eyed woman saw this and reported it to the police immediately.

During his stay at the hotel, Atzerodt had asked the bartender about Johnson's whereabouts. That aroused suspicion the next day, after Lincoln was assassinated. An employee of the hotel contacted the police regarding a "suspicious looking man in a gray coat".

The military police then conducted a search of Atzerodt's room on April 15 and found that he had not slept in it the night before. Additionally, he had a loaded revolver concealed under his pillow as well as a concealed Bowie knife. The police also found a bank book belonging to Booth in the room. Atzerodt was arrested on April 20, at the house of his cousin, Hartman Richter, in Germantown, Maryland.

== Trial and execution ==
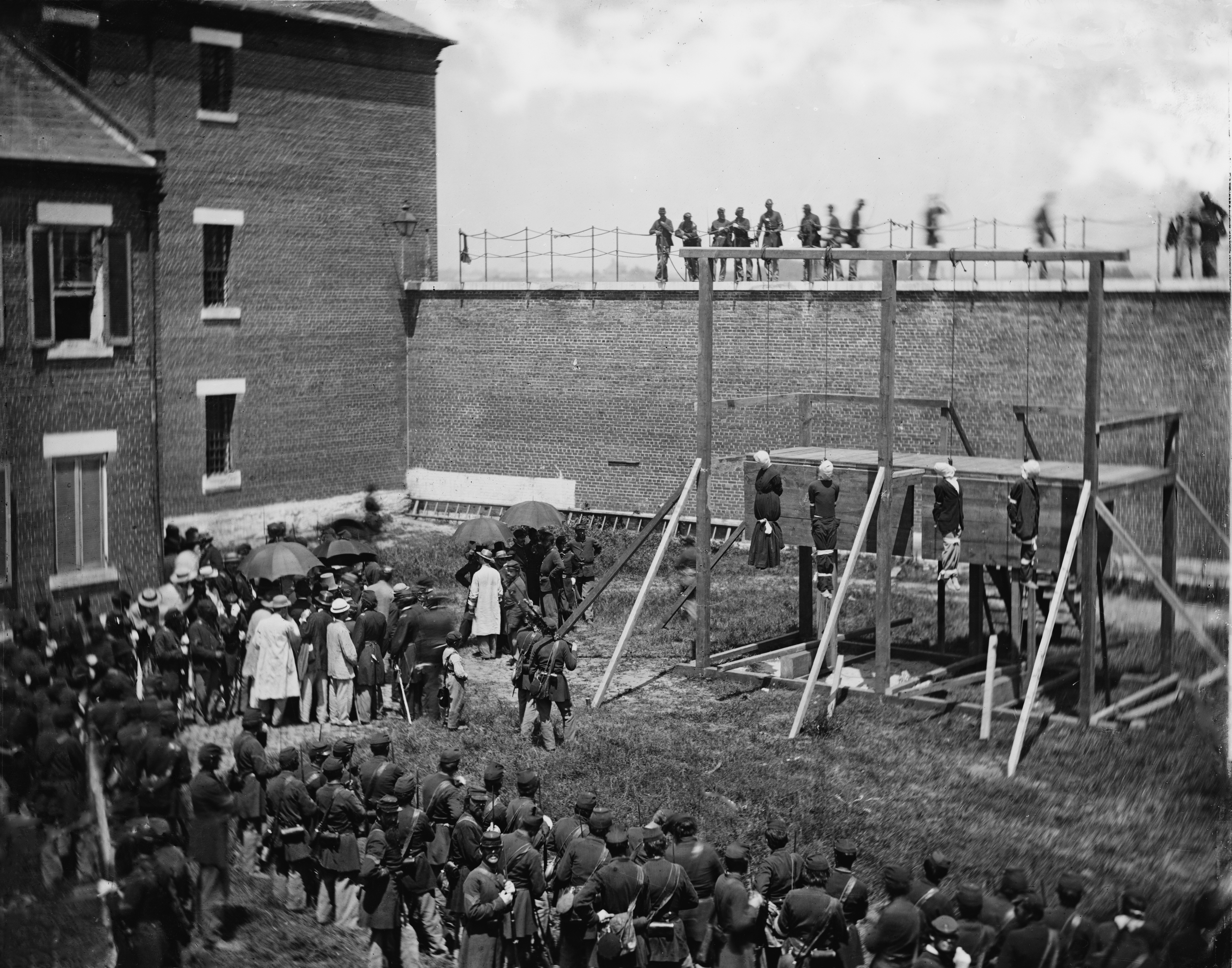
Execution of Mary Surratt, Lewis Powell, David Herold and George Atzerodt on July 7, 1865, in the courtyard of Washington Arsenal (now Fort McNair). Digitally restored.

Atzerodt's trial began on May 1, 1865. Atzerodt's attorney, Captain William Doster, stated to the court that he intended "to show that George Atzerodt was a constitutional coward; that if he had been assigned the duty of assassinating the Vice President, he could never have done it; and that, from his known cowardice, Booth probably did not assign to him any such duty." However, that was to no avail.

After the conviction, Atzerodt offered a confession to Reverend Butler, a minister who came to his cell to offer him comfort. Butler said that Atzerodt admitted going to the meeting in March to help plan the kidnapping of Lincoln while he attended a play at a hospital.

Atzerodt said he first heard about Booth's plan to assassinate the President just two hours before the shooting. Atzerodt said that Booth really wanted David Herold to assassinate Vice President Johnson because he thought that Herold had "more pluck" than Atzerodt did. Atzerodt said Booth wanted him to "back up" Herold and "give him more courage".

Atzerodt and three other convicted conspirators (Mary Surratt, Lewis Powell, and David Herold) were hanged in Washington, D.C., on July 7, 1865. Atzerodt's last words were "May we all meet in the other world. God take me now." He was re-interred in Glenwood Cemetery in 1869.

== Depiction in media ==
- Atzerodt appears in the season 1 episode "The Assassination of Abraham Lincoln" of Timeless, portrayed by Travis MacDonald. In the episode, he makes an attempt to assassinate Johnson but is stopped by Rufus and other soldiers and arrested by the authorities.
- Atzerodt appears in Manhunt, played by Tommie Turvey. In this depiction, he is arrested on the night of the assassination rather than six days later.
