= Arsenal Penitentiary =

Civil War-era military prison in Washington, DC

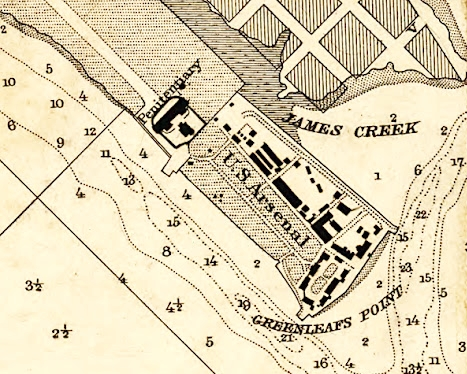
The Washington Arsenal and the District Penitentiary on the map, 1862

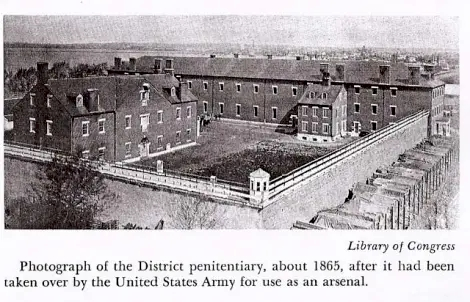
Arsenal Penitentiary, about 1865

The Arsenal Penitentiary was a penal institution in Washington, D. C. used as a military prison during the American Civil War, currently located inside Fort Lesley J. McNair. Four Lincoln assassination conspirators, David Herold, Lewis Powell, George Atzerodt, and Mary Surratt were executed on the grounds of the Arsenal Penitentiary on July 7, 1865.

== History ==
The Arsenal Penitentiary opened in 1831 on the Greenleaf Point at the confluence of the Potomac River and the Anacostia River within the District of Columbia. It was designed by Charles Bulfinch and constructed adjacent to the north side of the Washington Arsenal separated by a wall.

During the Civil War, the penitentiary was closed in September 1862 to store munitions on the request of the Ordnance Department. Its civilian inmates were sent to the Albany Penitentiary and court-martialed soldiers — to the Old Capital Prison. It was reactivated as a military prison in April 1865, and it was where eight Lincoln assassination conspirators were held, put to trial, and four of them were executed.

They were buried along with John Wilkes Booth in the prison's storeroom. In 1869 the bodies were released to the families.

The former Arsenal Penitentiary is a part of a restricted military installation and is closed to the public.

== See also ==
- USS Saugus (1863)
