= Drifter (2026 film) =

- Teaser poster
- Directed by: Sung Kang
- Written by: Sung Kang; Ted Chung; Aaron Strongoni
- Produced by: Sung Kang; Ted Chung; Brian Yang
- Starring: Sung Kang; Tamara Braun; Gregory Cruz; Emelia Hartford; Shane Johnson; James Pumphrey; Michael Nehring
- Cinematography: Bruce Thierry Cheung
- Edited by: Lam T. Nguyen
- Music by: Chanda Dancy
- Production company: Raison D'Etre
- Release date: September 12, 2026 (TIFF)
- Country: United States
- Language: English

Drifter is a 2026 American sports action film directed, co-written, and co-produced by Sung Kang (in his directorial debut). It stars Kang, Tamara Braun, Gregory Cruz, Emelia Hartford, Shane Johnson, James Pumphrey, and Michael Nehring.

== Cast ==
- Sung Kang as Tree
- Tamara Braun as Rosie
- Gregory Cruz as Lantana
- Emelia Hartford as Amelia
- Shane Johnson as Boston
- James Pumphrey as Dusty
- Michael Nehring as Bennett
- Adam LZ
- Brian Scotto
- Rutledge Wood as Cody
- Dai Yoshihara
- Chelsea DeNofa
- Luke Fink
- Dave Egan
- Jacob Gettins
- Jarod DeAnda
- Grant Anderson
- Chris Rudnik
- Nate Hamilton
- Kevin Darwish

== Production ==
In October 2023, actor Sung Kang was set to direct a live-action adaption of the street racing manga series Initial D, but it never came to fruition.

In July 2025, it was revealed that Kang would direct an original street racing action film titled Drifter, that would star real life racers including Adam LZ, Brian Scotto, James Pumphrey, Rutledge Wood, Dai Yoshihara, Chelsea DeNofa, Luke Fink, Dave Egan, Jarod DeAnda, Grant Anderson, Chris Rudnik, Nate Hamilton and Kevin Darwish. Principal photography began on August 10, 2025, in Englishtown, New Jersey. In March 2026, Tamara Braun, Gregory Cruz, Emelia Hartford, Shane Johnson, James Pumphrey, and Michael Nehring were revealed as the main cast of the film. The second trailer was released in June 2026.

== Release ==
The film premiered at the Toronto International Film Festival on September 12, 2026.
