= The Possession of Michael King =

- Directed by: David Jung
- Screenplay by: David Jung
- Story by: Tedi Sarafian; David Jung
- Produced by: Paul Brooks
- Starring: Shane Johnson; Ella Anderson; Cara Pifko
- Cinematography: Phil Parmet
- Edited by: Jake York
- Production companies: Gold Circle Films; Quickfire Films
- Distributed by: Anchor Bay Films
- Release dates: August 14, 2014 (Singapore); August 22, 2014 (United States)
- Running time: 83 minutes
- Country: United States
- Language: English
- Budget: $1.3 million
- Box office: $2.7 million

The Possession of Michael King is a 2014 American found footage horror film written and directed by David Jung, in his directorial debut, from a story by himself and Tedi Sarafian. The film had its world premiere on August 14, 2014 in Singapore and had a limited theatrical release in the United States on August 22 of the same year. It was released on to video on demand on August 26, 2014. It stars Shane Johnson as a widowed, atheist filmmaker who finds himself the target of demonic forces.

== Plot ==
Documentary-maker Michael King does not believe in God, the devil, or any other supernatural existence. His wife Samantha believed the opposite. For many years, she visited medium Beverly for spiritual assistance. In a confrontation with Beverly, Michael tries to blame Samantha's death on her. Beverly apologizes but doesn't address his concern and instead asks him to leave.

Michael struggles to pick up his life again after the death of Samantha, having his sister Beth help care for his daughter, Ellie. He decides to make a documentary to prove that there is no afterlife, in which he offers himself as a test subject for the darkest supernatural rituals people believe. He places an advertisement on the internet where people can respond with suggestions for experiments to prove the opposite of his position.

The first of Michael's internet contacts to visit him is a spiritual named Gibbons, whose sexually abusive father died of a heart attack shortly after he prayed to Satan for help, which Michael calls coincidence. Michael orders things online with which he could attempt to call demons, but nothing happens. Then he visits self-proclaimed demonologist Augustine and his wife Marsha. They give him LSD, bind him to a cross in their cellar, and chant spells onto him. Michael trips, but demons do not appear, and Augustine and Marsha use the opportunity to have sex with each other in his and his cameraman Jordan’s presence. Michael contacts a funeral director who claims to be a necromancer. He dehydrates Michael with the substance "DMT" from the body of a toad, which causes psychedelic experiences. Then he takes Michael to a cemetery at night, where he wants to transfer the spirit of a newly deceased person into his body. Before they are able to complete the ritual, police arrive. They run, and Jordan finds Michael under a trance, later claiming to have seen and felt Samantha.

Michael and Jordan attend a group meeting with a medium, who tries to send a message directly to Michael but has a seizure. At home, Michael begins suffering from a constant sound inside his head. He begins to sleepwalk while filming at night. He goes to a psychologist, who tries to get rid of the sound with hypnotherapy, but the session is interrupted. Jordan analyzes the camera recording and determines that human vocal cords are not capable of producing those sounds. Afterwards, Jordan leaves the documentary and Michael films alone.

The sound in Michael's head begins to appear more often, and is like a talking voice. He becomes convinced that something dangerous is happening to him. He goes to both the funeral owner and demonologists for help but they turn him away. At night he unwittingly goes into Beth's bedroom with a kitchen knife. The next day, Beth finds their dog, Fishbone, dead in Ellie's bed.

Because the church refuses to do an exorcism, he tries to do it at home on his own. The next day, the voice in his head demands that Michael kill Ellie. The next night, Michael handcuffs himself to his bed again while the demons torture him for not being able to make him harm anyone else. In the morning he finds his hand un-cuffed and bloodied. He finds a recording of the events the night before play on TV. He sees that Jordan came by, finding Michael in bed, and releases him to seek help. As the recording distorts, Michael finds Jordan dead, hanging from the ceiling.

Michael tries to kill himself, but every time, the entity stops him. Later, he watches a recording of Samantha, speaking from a hospital bed after the accident. She talks about meeting with angels and God and tries to convince Michael to not be worried for her. Michael talks to himself and his inner demon about the sounds inside his head, which were actually the sounds of angels trying to cover up the demon's voice, which he can now hear clearly. As he sits in a rocking chair at the front door, the voice in his head tells him: "We're together now, Michael."

In the morning, Beth comes home with Ellie. Michael kills Beth. Then he heads to Ellie, struggling with the demon to stop himself from hurting her. Michael begs Samantha for help. His wife's coin spins; looking into the mirror, he gets momentary control over himself, and uses the opportunity to throw himself out the window. He falls and dies while hearing Samantha's voice telling him "Everything will be all right now".

=== Epilogue (flashback) ===
On a sunny day, Michael and Samantha are with Ellie and Fishbone in the park. Because the time on the parking meter expired, he gives his wife a coin to put in the meter. She drops it in the road, and while picking it up, a car hits and fatally injures her.

== Cast ==
- Shane Johnson as Michael King
- Ella Anderson as Ellie King
- Cara Pifko as Samantha
- Tomas Arana as Augustine
- Luke Baines as Elias
- Dale Dickey as Beverly
- Julie McNiven as Beth King
- Patricia Healy as Marsha
- Tobias Jelinek as Father Gibbons
- Freda Foh Shen as Dr. Cox
- Krystal Alvarez as Waitress
- RJ Farrington as Audience Member
- Shirley Jordan as Church Assistant
- Michael Lesly as Cop
- Michael Ray Escamilla as The Engineer
- Cullen Douglas as Mortician

== Production ==
For the film, Jung drew inspiration from the character of Jack Torrance from the 1980 film The Shining. He noticed that The Shining and similar films that dealt with demonic possession did not tell the story from the viewpoint of the possessed person, and thought that it would be interesting to shift the film's view point to the possessed person. Jung chose to make the film found footage as it would allow the character of Michael to document the events as they occurred, in a "scientific approach and personal approach and documentarian approach". While researching for the film Jung "tracked down a lot of really arcane, occult manuscripts", some of which required translation, and also researched rituals that were passed down through oral traditions. In an interview with Nerdist, Jung stressed that he did not want to use rituals that were like "a lot of the other stuff that had been explored in the recent mythology", as he wanted to avoid "Ouija boards and candle lighting" as the film's sole staple of demonic rituals.

Johnson commented on his role, stating that he spent several months to prepare for the film where he viewed similar films to see "what works and what doesn't work" as he felt that "there's a lot of what doesn't work out there". He also researched demonology and necromancy along with viewing films such as The Last Exorcism, which he said made him feel like he "came into the project with some ammunition".

== Reception ==
On Rotten Tomatoes the film has an approval rating of 32% based on reviews from 19 critics. On Metacritic it has a score of and 34 out of 100 based on reviews from 10 critics, indicating "generally unfavorable reviews". Many film critics criticized the movie for being too overly familiar in how it delivered scares, its found footage aspect, and in its storyline. Brian Tallerico for RogerEbert.com panned the film overall, writing "What's so depressing about fare like this is how creatively uninspired it feels to see the same tricks pulled over and over again. Horror— true fear— only comes from the unknown, the unexpected, the unexplained. There’s never a moment in “The Possession of Michael King” that isn’t telegraphed either by the film itself or from memories of a superior one. It is a work that mistakes loud for scary and turns to camera tricks just to keep you awake." Twitch Film commented on the movie's familiarity and stated that "While Jung does not necessarily do anything new under the Sun with his jump scares, they are still effective in their execution."

Reviews from horror websites were more positive. Ain't It Cool News Horror praised Johnson's performance while Shock Till You Drop stated that Jung "gets the most out of the story and his talent". Reviewers for Dread Central were split—one praised the film for its twists while the other criticized it for having too many "cheap scares and found footage tropes".

== See also ==
- List of films featuring hallucinogens
