= Black Cadillac (film) =

- Directed by: John Murlowski
- Written by: John Murlowski, Will Aldis
- Produced by: Kenneth Burke
- Starring: Randy Quaid; Shane Johnson; Josh Hammond; Jason Dohring
- Cinematography: Douglas Smith
- Edited by: John Gilbert
- Distributed by: First Look International, MTI Home Video, Artist View Entertainment
- Release date: 2003
- Running time: 88 min.
- Country: United States
- Language: English

Black Cadillac is a 2003 American thriller film directed by John Murlowski, and written by Murlowski and Will Aldis. It stars Shane Johnson, Josh Hammond, Jason Dohring and Randy Quaid.

== Plot ==
Three young men, Scott, CJ and Scott's younger brother Robbie, stop at a roadhouse in snowy Wisconsin in search of a good time. Soon, CJ gets into a fight in the bar and Scott is forced to come inside and bail him and Robbie out. Leaving the roadhouse, the three set off for Minnesota, their home state.

Within a few minutes, a large, menacing black 1957 Cadillac limousine begins stalking them, repeatedly creeping up close and backing off again. Later, they pick up Deputy Sheriff Charlie Harman, whose '86 Chevrolet police cruiser has broken down on the side of the road. After picking up the friendly and talkative Charlie, the 1957 Cadillac Limousine follows them all the way, begins to act more aggressive and for unknown reasons challenges Scott's car (a red Saab 900) to a drag race, in which it tries repeatedly to wreck the Saab. Later, the men stop at a cafe at the side of the road to grab some refreshments for the night, where they soon discover a message on the windshield of the Saab stating "Your sin will find you", mysteriously unremovable.

The trio begins to puzzle why they are being pursued, who its occupants are, and who wrote the message. Suspicious, Scott decides to kick Charlie out of the car and leave him, believing he is the reason they are being chased. The Cadillac then reappears from hiding and Charlie is apparently killed by a gunman in the front seat. As the night progresses, the men attempt to escape and outwit the Cadillac, which causes the Saab to overheat. In the midst of frustration, a fight breaks out between the three men. CJ intervenes and stops the fight. After spotting a garage in the distance, the three push the Saab down the road towards it. They try repairing their car, but CJ is soon kidnapped by the Cadillac's occupants while outside. A chase between both cars across the nearby frozen lake ensues, in which Scott's car is finally destroyed by its overheating problems.

CJ is then found tied to a tree, and the reason for the entire set of events is revealed. Charlie, who in truth is a cruel and vindictive man whose death was faked by his brother Luther, the Cadillac's driver, has been attempting to identify the man whom his wife had been seeing at a roadhouse, and learned that it was Scott. As he prepares to kill Scott with a hunting knife, his wife Jeanine taunts and distracts him, allowing Scott, Robbie and CJ to break free and run. An insanely enraged Charlie, now personally driving the Cadillac, chases after them. When he corners Scott at the edge of a cliff, he waits a moment, then charges. His wife appears at the last moment in front of Scott, causing Charlie to veer away, sending the Cadillac crashing down the cliff and into the lake. Charlie and Luther are killed, and the destroyed, burning car sinks into the lake while Scott, CJ, Robbie and Jeanine look on. The next morning, the group finally makes it across the state line into Minnesota.

== Cast ==
- Randy Quaid as Charlie
- Shane Johnson as Scott
- Josh Hammond as C.J. LongHammer
- Jason Dohring as Robbie
- Adam Vernier as Beefy
- Kiersten Warren-Acevedo as Jeanine
- Robert Clunis as Luther
- Taylor Stanley as Denise
