= Shane Johnson (actor) =

American actor

- Born: February 29, 1976 (age 50)
- Education: Ephrata High School; Whitman College
- Occupation: Actor
- Years active: 1998–present

Shane Johnson (born February 29, 1976) is an American actor with numerous credits in both television and film. He is noted for playing Scott in Black Cadillac and Cooper Saxe in Power and its spin-off Power Book II: Ghost. He has also appeared as Will Cooper in two episodes of the 2008 TNT show Raising the Bar.

== Career ==
Most recently filmed in the Little Walter project "Them: The Scare" alongside Luke James on Amazon Streaming Video.

== Early life ==
He graduated from Ephrata High School, in Ephrata, Washington, in 1994 and graduated from Whitman College, in Walla Walla, in 1998.

== Filmography ==
=== Film ===
Year	Title	Role	Notes
1998	Saving Private Ryan	Soldier on the Beach	
2000	Love, Lust & Joy	Barry	
2001	Behind Enemy Lines	Red Crown Operator #2	
2002	Pumpkin	Jeremy	
2002	The Big Time	Timothy Wilkison	TV movie
2003	Black Cadillac	Scott	
2007	Take	Officer Runion	
2008	The Great Buck Howard	Las Vegas Producer	
2009	The Hardest Job in the Business	Craft Service Guy	Short
2011	Cage Shift	Kevin the Magician	Short
2013	Shadow on the Mesa	Art Dowdy	TV movie
2013	Chez Upshaw	Slade Woodshed	
2013	Hot Guys with Guns	Bad Actor	
2014	The Possession of Michael King	Michael King	
2016	Losing in Love	Jimmy	
2016	Talk to Me	Father	Short
2016	The Human Element	Dr. Michael Kuntz	Short
2019	From Zero to I Love You	Clay	
2020	BoyMom	Smith Gates	Short
2023	Death Everlasting	Chris Wright	
2023	Decade of the Dead	Grinner	
2024	Call Me Now: The Rise and Fall of Miss Cleo	Steven	TV movie
2026	Drifter	Boston	Post-production

=== Television ===
Year	Title	Role	Notes
2000	Undressed	Casey	Recurring Cast: Season 2
2000	Freaks and Geeks	Good-Looking Guy	Episode: "Kim Kelly Is My Friend"
2000	Strong Medicine	-	Episode: "Pilot"
2002	ER	Jason	Episode: "A Hopeless Wound"
2002	Birds of Prey	Colin	Episode: "Primal Scream"
2006	Bones	Kyle Richardson	Episode: "Mother and Child in the Bay"
2006	CSI: NY	Liam Griffin	Episode: "Love Run Cold"
2006	Cold Case	Sean 'Coop' Cooper	Episode: "Forever Blue"
2008	CSI: Miami	T.J. Pratt	Episode: "To Kill a Predator"
2008	Raising the Bar	Will Cooper	Recurring Cast: Season 1
2009	Deep Sea Salvage	Narrator	Main Narrator
2010	Miami Medical	Ryan	Episode: "An Arm and a Leg"
2010	Private Practice	Dave Walker	Episode: "Take Two"
2011	The Closer	Marcus Winslow	Episode: "Under Control"
2012	NCIS	CIA Agent Stephen Wheeler	Episode: "The Missionary Position"
2012	Castle	Deputy Adam Jones	Episode: "Murder He Wrote"
2012	Criminal Minds	Chad Mills	Episode: "The Fallen"
2012	Easy to Assemble	Grover Thorsten	Recurring Cast: Season 4
2014–20	Power	Cooper Saxe	Recurring Cast: Season 1, Main Cast: Seasons 2–6
2017	Scandal	Donny Logan	Episode: "Head Games"
2020	Find a Way or Make One	Netflix (voice)	Episode: "Are You Still?"
2020–23	Power Book II: Ghost	Cooper Saxe	Main Cast: Seasons 1–3 (28 episodes)
2022	Blue Bloods	Dr. Knight	Episode: "First Blush"
2022	Chicago P.D.	Andrew Chaffey	Episode: "Sympathetic Reflex"
2023	S.W.A.T.	Special Agent Alan Ritter	Episode: "Stockholm"
2024	Them	Investigator Phillips	Recurring Cast: Season 2
2024	Grey's Anatomy	Anthony Valentine	Episode: "The Marathon Continues"

=== Video games ===
Year	Title	Role
2007	The World Ends with You	Megumi Kitaniji (English version, voice)
2010	Fallout: New Vegas	Various Roles (voice)
2010	The 3rd Birthday	Various Roles (voice)
2015	Final Fantasy Type-0 HD	Various Roles (voice)
2015	Rise of the Tomb Raider	Various Roles (voice)
2016	World of Final Fantasy	Various Roles (voice)
2019	Kingdom Hearts III	Various Roles (voice)
2020	Final Fantasy VII Remake	Various Roles (voice)
