= List of Abraham Lincoln artifacts and relics =

External videos
- "Collecting Lincoln Memorabilia", panel discussion with Thomas F. Schwartz, Louise Taper, Daniel R. Weinberg, and Frank J. Williams, February 8, 2009, C-SPAN

This is a list of artifacts and relics related to the life, 1865 death, and legacy of United States President Abraham Lincoln, his presidency, and his family.

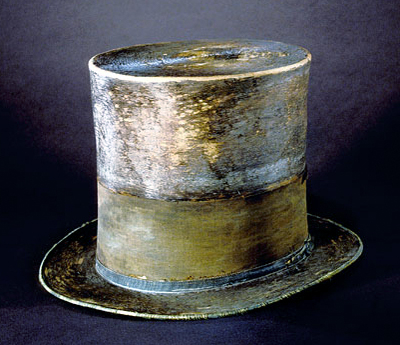
Top hat worn by Lincoln to the theater

- The bed that Lincoln occupied in the Petersen House and other items from the bedroom were bought by Chicago collector Charles F. Gunther and are now owned by and on display at the Chicago History Museum.
- At Ford's Theatre, the National Park Service has a Brooks Brothers overcoat and suit worn by Lincoln on the night he was shot, as well as two pillows from Lincoln's deathbed at the Petersen House across the street.
- The Army Medical Museum, now named the National Museum of Health and Medicine, has retained in its collection several artifacts relating to the assassination. Currently on display are the bullet that struck Lincoln, the probe used by Barnes, pieces of Lincoln's skull and hair, and the surgeon's cuff stained with Lincoln's blood.
- The chair in which Lincoln was shot is on display at the Henry Ford Museum in Dearborn, Michigan.
- Found in Lincoln's pockets after his death were two pairs of eyeglasses, an eyeglass case, a lens polisher, a pocketknife, a watch fob, a monogrammed sleeve button, a monogrammed linen handkerchief, and a brown leather wallet containing a pencil, a Confederate five-dollar bill, and eight recent newspaper clippings with favorable remarks about Lincoln and his policies, including British MP John Bright's testimonial for Lincoln's re-election. The Confederate currency was probably acquired as a souvenir when Lincoln visited Richmond and Petersburg earlier that month. These items were kept in the Lincoln family for many years and are now stored in the Rare Book and Special Collections Division in the Library of Congress.
- The day before his assassination, Lincoln wrote a personal check for $800 to "self", reportedly to cover some debts incurred by his wife. That check, and several other historical checks, were put on display by Huntington Bank at a branch in Cleveland in 2012, after a Huntington employee discovered the checks in 2011 while looking through old documents from a bank Huntington had acquired in 1983. Although checks from several other historical figures were also on display, the check written by Lincoln two days before his death received the most attention.
