= Peter Taltavull =

Lincoln-conspirators trial witness, French horn player (1825–1881)

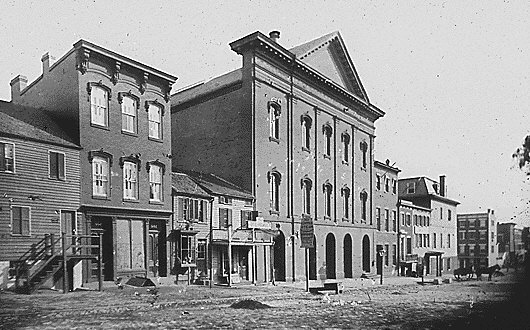
The Star Saloon was located in the three-story structure immediately to the right of Ford's Theatre.

Peter Taltavull (c. 1825 – April 8, 1881) played a minor role in the events surrounding the assassination of Abraham Lincoln. John Wilkes Booth stopped at Taltavull's Star Saloon just before going to Ford's Theatre next door and assassinating President Abraham Lincoln.

== Biography ==
Taltavull owned the Star Saloon located in Washington, D.C., next door 3to Ford's Theatre. Lincoln's assassin, John Wilkes Booth, stopped at Taltavull's saloon just before entering the theater and shooting the President. Taltavull witnessed Lincoln's mortally wounded body being carried out by doctors, the unconscious President gasping for air. One of the guards said they should take Lincoln to the White House, but Doctor Charles Leale rejected the idea, saying he would die on the way, as the bumpy carriage ride would make his condition worse. The Star Saloon was briefly considered as a place to take the wounded Lincoln, but Taltavull said that it wouldn't be respectful to Lincoln if he died in a saloon. Right after Taltavull said this, Henry Safford shouted over to the doctors to bring Lincoln to the William Petersen's boarding house, which Safford lived, where Lincoln was laid down and cared for. He died the next day from his gunshot wounds, never regaining conscious.

On May 15, 1865, Taltavull testified for the prosecution during the conspiracy trial, and stated that he had been acquainted with the defendant, David Herold, as far back as Herold's boyhood. Taltavull also testified that he had served Booth a drink of whiskey and water shortly before the assassination.

For over twenty-five years Taltavull had been a French horn player with the Marine Band.

Taltavull died on April 8, 1881, and is buried at Congressional Cemetery.

== See also ==
- Abraham Lincoln assassination
