= Emelia Hartford =

Social Media Personality

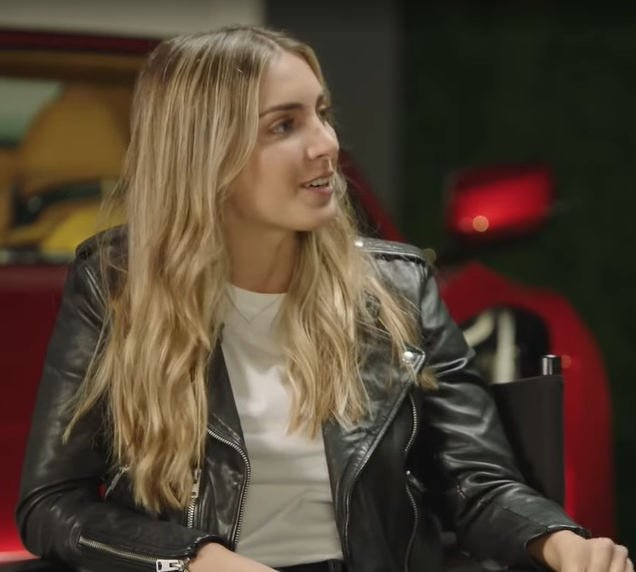
- Hartford in 2021
- Born: Los Angeles, California, United States
- Occupations: Actress; YouTuber
- Years active: 2017–present

YouTube information
- Channel: Emelia Hartford
- Genre: Vlogs
- Subscribers: 2.11 million
- Views: 648.7 million
- Last updated: September 27, 2025
- Website: emeliahartford.com

Emelia Hartford is an American actress, YouTuber and social media personality. She is known for her role in the Gran Turismo film, becoming the fastest women in history on 4 wheels to race Pikes Peak, and building a world record breaking custom Corvette C8. She has a YouTube channel about performance car customization, which launched in 2017.

== Background ==
Before launching her YouTube channel, Hartford juggled small acting gigs between service industry jobs. As a hobby after her work shifts, she would work on customizing her cars and occasionally chronicled her progress with posts on Instagram. Her Instagram posts eventually led to tire manufacturer Michelin inviting her to New York to launch its performance summer tire, the Pilot Sport 4S. At the Michelin event, Hartford met other car-build influencers who advised her how to create videos. Afterward, she bought her first camera and started her YouTube channel. As of September 2026, her YouTube channel had 2.1 million subscribers and her videos had more than 645 million views.

== Early life ==
Emelia Hartford was born and raised in Los Angeles, California. Although her early childhood was spent in California, her family later relocated to Bloomington, Indiana, a decision made to be closer to her mother’s family following a personal tragedy.

At age 15, Hartford lost her father to suicide, a deeply formative event in her life. She has frequently cited how obtaining her driver’s license and immersion into the car enthusiast community provided both a sense of freedom and a lifeline during that difficult period.

She describes the car community she discovered in Indiana as a new “found-family.” Her early car was an Infiniti G35, a manual, rear-wheel-drive model that she chose based on online forums. She humorously recalled smoking the clutch on her very first drive home because she did not yet know how to drive a manual transmission car (stick shift).

== Film, TV, and media ==
Before starting her YouTube channel, Hartford took small acting roles in various films. She has continued acting and most recently can be seen in Sony's biographical sports drama Gran Turismo as 'Leah Vega' opposite Orlando Bloom, David Harbour, Darren Barnet, Geri Halliwell, Djimon Hounsou and Archie Madekwe. From director Neill Blomkamp, the film tells the true story of a teenage Gran Turismo video game player who becomes a professional race car driver. The film opened #1 at the Box Office on August 25, 2023.

Prior to this she had a role in the 2021 Netflix film A California Christmas: City Lights. as well as credits including HBO Max's A Hollywood Christmas and the Netflix romantic comedy That's Amor. From Mexico with Love and Nightfall.

Hartford has also been a host or judge on numerous shows. She appeared on the second season of Netflix's reality TV show, Fastest Car, and was a judge on SEMA: Battle of the Builders. In June 2022, Motor Trend Group announced that Hartford would be one of the hosts of its new animated series, Super Turbo Story Time.

Hartford has appeared in media with major American automakers. In 2020, she co-starred with NBA player Devin Booker in a short film by Chevrolet for the release of the 2023 Corvette Z06. In June 2022, she appeared as a guest on the podcast of Jim Farley, CEO of Ford Motor Company.

In September 2023, she also began co-hosting the weekly podcast Car Stories alongside co-host Sung Kang; co-star of the Fast & Furious franchise.

== Racing career ==
Hartford’s motorsport journey began at the grassroots level in local autocross competition. She first entered events organized by her local chapter of the Sports Car Club of America, where she quickly achieved class-winning performances that encouraged her to pursue racing more seriously.

=== Corvette C8 World Record Build ===
"Phoenix", Hartford's custom Corvette C8, is one of the fastest C8s in the world. Becoming known for breaking the world record for quickest C8 in the quarter-mile. In June 2021, Hartford drove the car to a 9.36-second time with a trap speed of 147 miles per hour (237 km/h) at the Famoso Raceway in Southern California during a private testing event. This result surpassed her previous record of 9.41 seconds at 144 mph (232 km/h) set in March 2021. Holding the record for over a year, it was later surpassed by a custom C8 by FuelTech which finished the quarter-mile in 8.973 seconds at 160.92 miles per hour (258.98 km/h).

=== Nissan Z World Record Build ===
After her success with the Corvette, Hartford then went on as a professional race car driver to smash the quarter-mile record for the new generation Nissan Z in December 2024. She was able to put down a time of 7.75 seconds and a top speed of 181.85 miles per hour (292.66 km/h) making her the current record holder for fastest Nissan Z in the world with a car she built in her own garage in just 57 days.

=== Pikes Peak ===
In June 2025, Hartford made her professional debut in the GT4 class at the 103rd Pikes Peak International Hill Climb, driving a Porsche 718 GT4 RS Clubsport for the Mobil 1 race team prepared by BBi Autosport and Porsche Colorado Springs. After qualifying on pole position, she finished second in class with a rookie time of 4 minutes 47.756 seconds on a shortened course that ended at Glen Cove due to extreme wind at higher elevation. The result marked a successful professional hill climb debut and established her as one of the leading female competitors at the event.

In June 2026, she posted the female record time of 10:11.018 in a ZR1 Corvette, earning her the title of "Queen of the Mountain".

=== Formula Racing ===
Earlier in 2025, Hartford was selected for the inaugural Formula E “Evo Sessions,” a program pairing 11 creators and athletes with professional Formula E teams ahead of the Miami GEN3 Evo showcase. She was assigned to Maserati MSG Racing, working alongside 2021–22 Formula E world champion Stoffel Vandoorne. The program included simulator training, physical conditioning, engineering briefings, and on-track familiarization laps, culminating with participants driving the all-wheel-drive GEN3 Evo car, which accelerates 0–60 mph in 1.82 seconds. Hartford ultimately won the competition, being awarded Grand Champion of the Evo Sessions. Hartford returned to the "Evo Sessions" in 2026 this time driving for Porsche with coaching from 2023-24 Formula E World Champion Pascal Wehrlein. Hartford finished 6th in the session and second quickest of her team the "Quickstars".

== Philanthropy ==
Hartford has transformed personal adversity into advocacy through her mental health initiatives. The tragedy of losing her father to suicide at age 15, which she has spoken about openly. She regularly recounted how cars served as both her emotional refuge and a means to heal.

In 2020, she launched "Return to Life", an apparel line centered on mental health awareness, with a portion of proceeds benefiting related nonprofit organizations. That same year, she joined the board of Alive and Well, a nonprofit dedicated to expanding access to mental health care services.
