= Seward (surname) =

Seward is a surname of Old English origin.

== Notables of this name include ==
- Adam Seward (born 1982), National Football League player
- Albert Seward (1863–1941), British botanist and geologist, winner of the 1934 Darwin Medal
- Alec Seward (1901–1972), American blues musician
- Anna Seward (1742–1809), English writer of the 18th century
- Bill Seward (1958–2022), American broadcaster, actor, and coach
- Billie Seward (1912-1982), American actress
- Diane Seward, New Zealand thermochronologist
- Dylan Seward (born 2008), baseball player
- Ed Seward (1867–1947), Major League Baseball pitcher
- Frances Adeline Seward (1805–1865), wife of William H. Seward Sr., a First Lady of New York State
- Frederick D. Seward (born 1931), American astronomer
- Frederick W. Seward (1830–1915), son of William H. Seward Sr., two-time Assistant Secretary of State
- Gary Seward (born 1961), English professional footballer
- George Seward (1840–1910), U.S. diplomat, envoy to China 1876–1880
- Georgene Hoffman Seward (1902–1992), American feminist psychologist
- Harold H. Seward (1930–2012), developer 1954 of the Radix sort computer algorithm
- Henry Hake Seward (1778-1848), English architect
- Jack Seward (1924–2010), American writer, linguist, and Order of the Sacred Treasure recipient
- James Seward (cricketer) (born 1997), English cricketer
- James L. Seward (New York politician) (1951–2024), U.S. Senator
- James Lindsay Seward (1813–1886), American politician, U.S. Representative from Georgia 1853–1859
- Jonathan Lewis Seward (born 1984), bassist of American rock band Avenged Sevenfold
- Julian Seward, developer of bzip2, an open-source data compression program
- Olive Risley Seward (1844–1908), adopted daughter of William H. Seward Sr
- Thomas Seward (1708-1790), English clergyman and author
- Thomas Seward (MP) (died 1406), English MP and merchant
- Walter H. Seward (1896–2008), American supercentenarian
- William H. Seward [Sr.] (1801–1872), Governor of New York, U.S. Senator, and Secretary of State under Abraham Lincoln
- William H. Seward Jr. (1839–1920), son of William H. Seward Sr., a brigadier general for the Union during the Civil War
- William Seward (disambiguation), various people with the name

Fictional

- John Seward, a character in Bram Stoker's 1897 novel Dracula

== See also ==
- Siward (disambiguation)
