= Augustus Henry Seward =

United States Army officer (1826 – 1876)

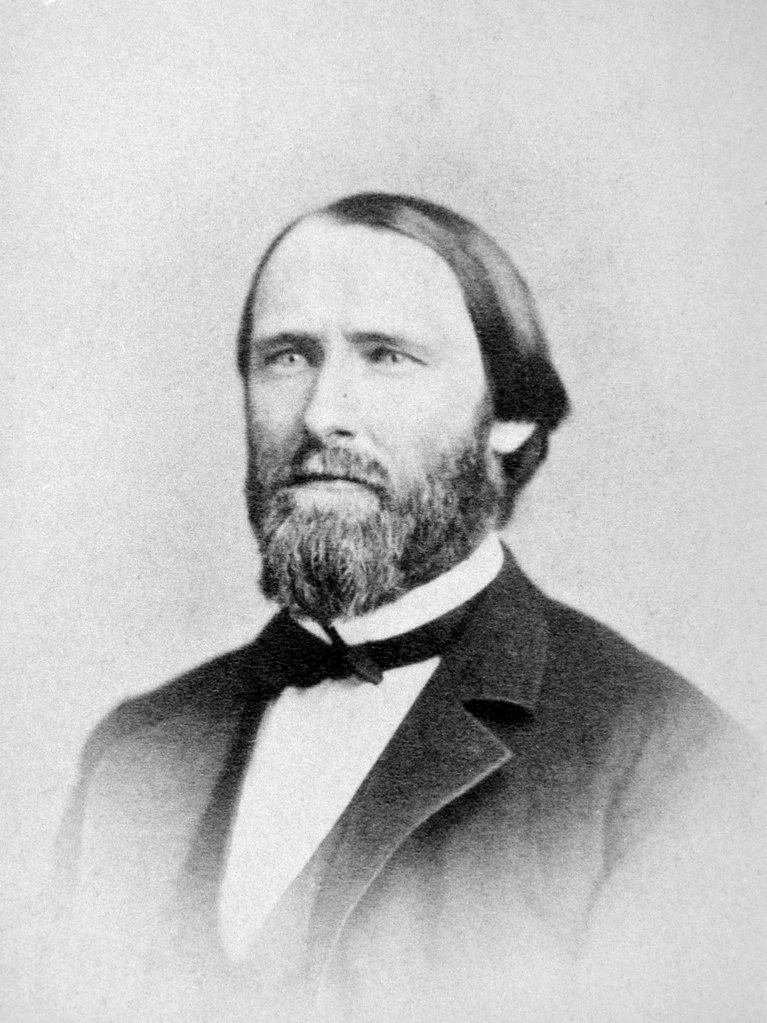

Personal details
- Born: October 1, 1826 Auburn, New York, U.S.
- Died: September 11, 1876 (aged 49) Montrose, New York, U.S.
- Parent(s): William H. Seward; Frances Adeline Miller

Military service
- Allegiance: United States; Union
- Branch/service: United States Army; Union Army
- Years of service: 1847–1876
- Rank: Brevet Colonel
- Battles/wars: Mexican–American War; American Civil War

Augustus Henry Seward (October 1, 1826 – September 11, 1876) was the son of William H. Seward and Frances Adeline Seward. He was a career officer in the United States Army, and attained the rank of brevet Colonel.

== Early life ==
Augustus H. Seward was born in Auburn, New York, on October 1, 1826, and was the first child of William H. Seward and his wife Frances Miller. In addition to being the son of William H. and Frances Seward, Augustus Seward was the grandson of Judges Elijah Miller and Samuel S. Seward, and the brother of Frederick W. Seward, Cornelia Seward, William H. Seward Jr. and Frances Adeline "Fanny" Seward.

In 1847, Seward graduated from the United States Military Academy, ranked 34th of 38 students. While at West Point his roommates included Henry Heth, who ranked 38th.

== Career ==
After graduation, Seward was appointed a second lieutenant in the 8th Infantry Regiment, and he served with his regiment in Mexico during the Mexican–American War. After the war Augustus Seward continued his military career, serving with the 5th Infantry in: East Pascagoula, Mississippi; Forts Towson and Washita in Indian Territory; on the Utah Expedition; and at Forts Defiance and Union in New Mexico Territory. He was promoted to first lieutenant in 1853 and captain in 1859.

=== Civil War ===
In 1861 Augustus Seward transferred to the Paymaster Corps and was promoted to major. Later that year he declined an appointment in the 19th Infantry. During the American Civil War he carried out paymaster and staff duties in New Mexico Territory, Arizona Territory and Washington, D.C. He received brevet promotions to lieutenant colonel in May, 1865 and colonel in November, 1865 in recognition of his Civil War service.

=== Assassination attempt ===
Augustus Seward was staying at the home of his father in Washington, D.C., on April 14, 1865, when Lewis Powell attempted to assassinate William H. Seward at the same time John Wilkes Booth was carrying out the assassination of President Abraham Lincoln. His father was in bed recovering from injuries sustained in a carriage accident, and a jaw splint he was wearing as a result likely deflected Powell's knife and saved Seward's life. Augustus, his brother Frederick and others in the house were attacked by Powell as Powell attempted to gain access to Seward's bedroom, as they intervened in Powell's attack on Seward, and again as Powell made his escape. Augustus suffered seven stab wounds and remained in Washington until 1868, where he testified at Powell's trial, and performed staff duties while recovering from his wounds.

=== Later career ===
Augustus Seward continued to serve in the Army and perform paymaster and staff duties. His postings included: Boston, Massachusetts, from January to October 1868; New York City from 1868 to 1869; leave of absence from February to December 1869; Chief Paymaster of the Department of the Cumberland from December 1869 to May 1870; Chief Paymaster of the Department of the South and Paymaster of the department headquarters from May 1870 to October 1871; and Paymaster of the Department of Dakota from November 1871 to May 1876.

== Death and burial ==
In May 1876, Seward was diagnosed with an affliction described as paralysis of the eye. He took a leave of absence from the Army and died at the home of his brother Frederick in Montrose, New York, on September 11, 1876.

Augustus Street in Auburn, one of four streets named for members of the Seward family, and which form a city block, is named for him.
