= William Seward (disambiguation) =

William H. Seward (1801–1872) was an American politician.

William Seward may also refer to:

- William Seward (preacher) (1702–1740), Methodist martyr
- William Seward (anecdotist) (1747–1799), English anecdotist
- William H. Seward Jr. (1839–1920), banker and US Civil War general
- Bill Seward, American sports broadcaster
- USRC William H. Seward, a Revenue Cutter Service schooner
