= Fanny Seward =

Daughter of William Seward

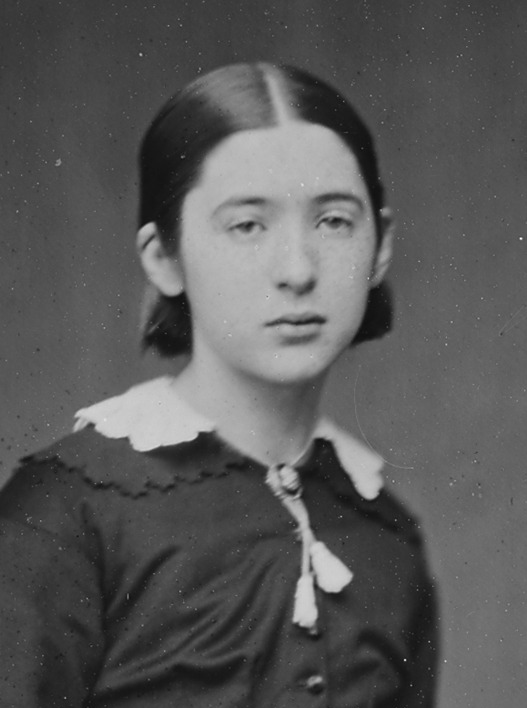
- Seward, c. 1861
- Born: Frances Adeline Seward; December 9, 1844; Auburn, New York, US
- Died: October 29, 1866 (aged 21); Washington D.C., US
- Resting place: Fort Hill Cemetery
- Parent(s): William H. Seward; Frances Adeline Miller

Frances Adeline Seward (December 9, 1844 – October 29, 1866) was the daughter of United States secretary of state William H. Seward and his wife Frances Adeline Miller Seward. The youngest of five children born to the Sewards, she was their only daughter to survive to adulthood, although she herself died at the young age of 21.

== Early life ==
Frances Seward was born in Auburn, New York on December 9, 1844. Her father was a prominent Whig who had served as Governor of New York, and would later become a United States senator, join the Republican Party, and serve as Secretary of State under Presidents Abraham Lincoln and Andrew Johnson. She was named for her mother, who was the daughter of a judge, and a stalwart abolitionist.

Seward received a progressive education and upbringing, and aspired to be a writer. Her mother was frequently ill and ill-disposed to travel and socializing, and chose to remain at home in Auburn while her husband served in the Senate and the cabinet. When her father began his term as Secretary of State in 1861, Seward, then sixteen, resided with him in Washington, D.C. and became his closest domestic companion.

Recognized as sensitive and precocious, she demonstrated her desire for a literary career by authoring both fiction and poetry. She is best known for keeping a voluminous diary throughout the course of the Civil War, which documented with intimate detail the social and political milieu of Washington during the Lincoln administration.

== Attempted assassination of William H. Seward ==
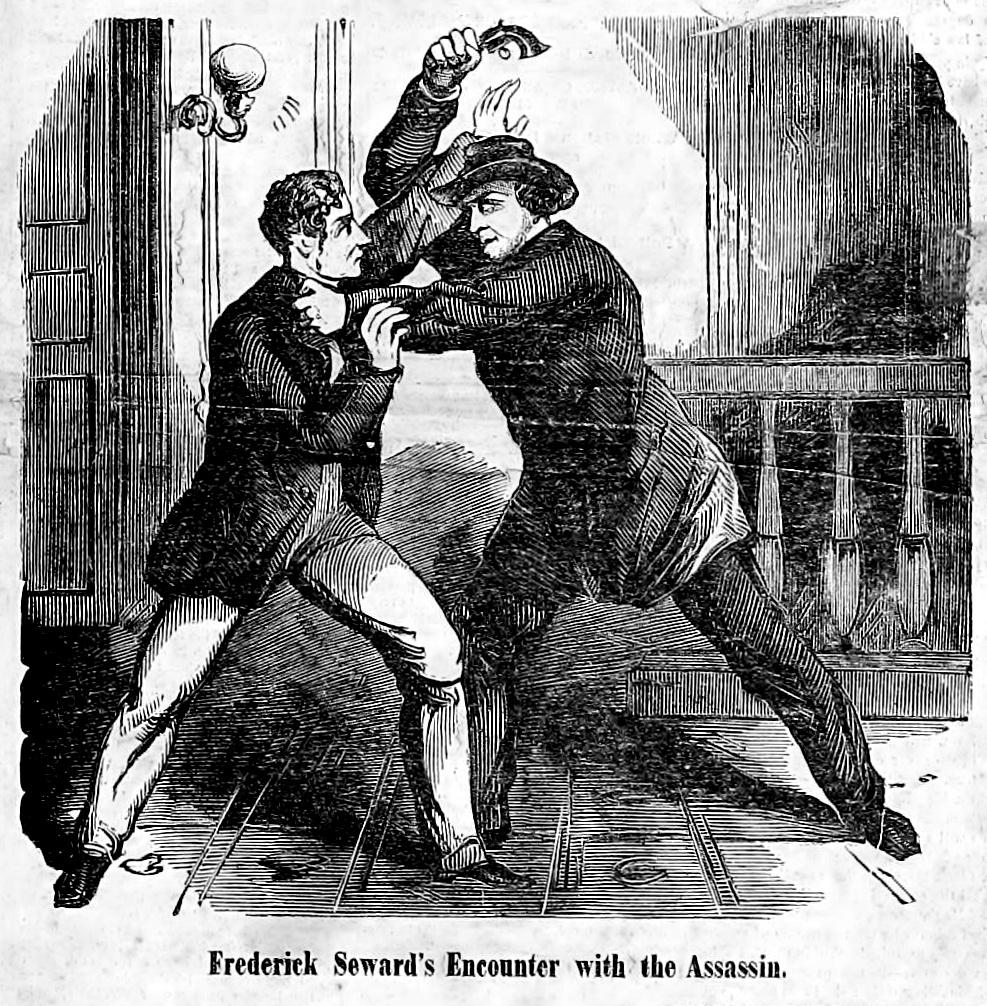
Lewis Powell attacking Frederick Seward after attempting to shoot him

On the night of April 14, 1865, Lewis Powell, an associate and co-conspirator of John Wilkes Booth, attempted to assassinate Seward at his Washington D.C. home. Powell's attack on Seward was coordinated with Booth's attack on President Abraham Lincoln and George Atzerodt's aborted attack on Vice President Andrew Johnson in order to maximize the element of surprise and to sever the continuity of the United States government. Another member of the conspiracy, David Herold, led Powell to the Seward home on horseback and was responsible for holding Powell's horse while he committed the attack as well as guiding him out of the city during their escape. Powell was able to gain access to the Seward home by telling William Bell, an African American waiter employed by the Sewards, that he was delivering medicine for Seward, who had been badly injured nine days earlier in a carriage accident.

Upon entry to the home, Powell began up the stairs, but was stopped at the top of the stairs by Frederick Seward, the Secretary's son. Frederick told Powell that his father was asleep and that he (Frederick) would take the medicine to him. Fanny Seward was in her father's bedroom. Hearing the noise on the stairs, she opened the door and looked outside. Powell asked her if the Secretary was asleep, and she acknowledged that he was. Now certain of William Seward's location, Powell pretended to leave and started down the stairs, but suddenly turned around, drew a pistol, and pointed it at Frederick's head. The pistol misfired.

Realizing he needed to act quickly, Powell began beating Frederick over the head with the barrel of his gun. The force of Powell's blows crippled Frederick Seward and left him sprawled on the floor, in a pool of blood. Powell's gun was also rendered useless during the melee, as it had become jammed.

Seward was in her father's bedroom with him. Hearing the loud noises coming from the second floor hallway, she opened the door to see her brother slumped on the floor and a wide-eyed Powell charging directly towards her, a dagger in his hand. Powell burst through the door, threw Fanny Seward to the side, and jumped on the Secretary's bed, repeatedly stabbing him in the face and neck area. Powell also attacked and injured another son (Augustus Seward), and a soldier and nurse (Sergeant George Robinson) who had been assigned to stay with Seward.

Outside the home, David Herold, who could hear the screams coming from the house, fled with both horses, leaving Powell to fend for himself. Powell, convinced that he had mortally wounded the Secretary, fled down the stairs, and stabbed a messenger, Emerick Hansell, who had arrived just as Powell was escaping; Hansell never fully recovered from the stabbing.

Fanny Seward and George Robinson worked to save Secretary Seward's life and tend to the others who were injured, attempting to stanch their bleeding and tending to their wounds until doctors could arrive. All five men that were injured that night survived, although Secretary Seward would carry facial scars from the attack for the rest of his life.

Powell was captured several days later at the boarding house of Mary Surratt. He was executed on July 7, 1865, along with David Herold, George Atzerodt, and Mrs. Surratt, three of the seven convicted as conspirators in the Lincoln assassination.

== Death and burial ==
The events of that night took their toll on Mrs. Frances Seward, Seward's mother, whose health rapidly declined after the attack. She died just months later, on June 21, 1865.

Seward succumbed to tuberculosis in Washington on October 29, 1866. She was buried with other family members at Auburn's Fort Hill Cemetery.

=== Legacy ===
Her written works are part of the University of Rochester's Rare Books and Special Collections.
