= Elijah Miller =

American judge

- Born: April 11, 1772
- Died: November 13, 1851 (aged 79)
- Occupation(s): Lawyer and judge
- Relatives: Augustus Henry Seward (grandson); Frederick W. Seward (grandson)

Elijah Miller (April 11, 1772 – November 13, 1851) was a lawyer and judge in Auburn, New York.

== Early life and career ==
Miller was born on April 11, 1772. He was the son of Josiah Miller (1749–1817). He became a lawyer, and then a Judge in Cayuga County, New York. In 1817, he was a judge in Cattaraugus County, New York. In 1816, he helped found the Auburn State Prison with business partners John H. Beach and James Glover, since Miller was also an investor in local real estate.

William H. Seward, the future U.S. Secretary of State, was a junior partner in Miller's law practice.

== Personal life ==
In 1800, Miller was married to Hannah Foote (1784–1811), who was born in Colchester in New London County, Connecticut. Together, they were the parents of:

- Frances Adeline Miller (1805–1865), who married William H. Seward (1801–1872) in 1824. Miller granted permission for Seward to marry his daughter under the condition that they live in his South Street home with him.
- Lazette Miller (1805–1875), who married Alvah Worden (1797–1856), a New York Assemblyman who was a delegate to the Constitutional convention.

Miller died on November 13, 1851. After his death, he was the first person buried at Fort Hill Cemetery in Auburn, a cemetery he was responsible for creating.
