= George W. Brinkerhoff =

American farmer and politician

George W. Brinkerhoff (October 23, 1838 – March 20, 1919) was an American farmer and politician from New York.

== Life ==
Brinkerhoff was born on October 23, 1838, in Red Creek, New York.

In August 1862, during the American Civil War, Brinkerhoff enlisted in the 138th New York Infantry Regiment as a sergeant in Company A. In December 1862, the Regiment became the 9th New York Heavy Artillery Regiment. In March 1864, he was promoted to second lieutenant. In October 1864, he was again promoted to first lieutenant. In December 1864, he was promoted to captain of his company. He was mustered out with the rest of his company in July 1865. He was also made a brevet major for his service.

After the War, Brinkerhoff returned to Red Creek, where he worked as a farmer. By 1899, he had a 200 acre farm. He also served as town supervisor for Wolcott. He was a member of the Farmer's Alliance and the Grange.

In 1891, Brinkerhoff was elected to the New York State Assembly as a Republican, representing the Wayne County 1st District. He served in the Assembly in 1892. While in the Assembly, he helped pass a bill that abolished fees for county clerks in sheriffs in the state, along with providing for constructing a bridge across Sodus Bay.

Brinkerhoff was a member of the Grand Army of the Republic and the Odd Fellows. He married Marie Frost in 1860. They had four children, Leslie, Ernest, Eliza, and Della.

Brinkerhoff died on March 20, 1919. He was buried in the Fairmont Cemetery in Red Creek.

New York State Assembly
Preceded by Eliot B. Norris	New York State Assembly; Wayne County, 1st District; 1892	Succeeded by District Abolished
