= Walter G. Robinson =

Adjutant general of New York (1934–1940)

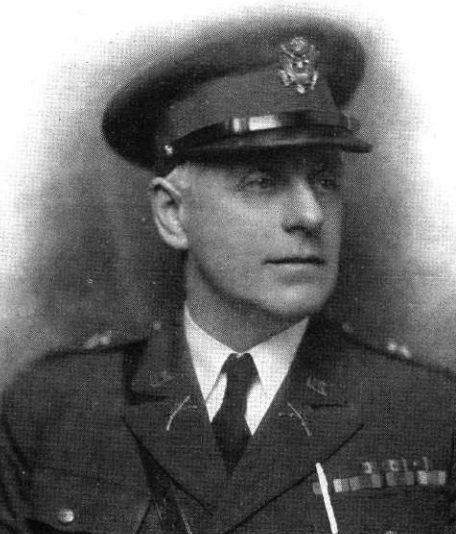
- Robinson in December 1934
- Born: 11 April 1879; Auburn, New York, US
- Died: 25 January 1940 (aged 60); Manhattan, New York, US
- Burial place: Fort Hill Cemetery, Auburn, New York, US
- Alma mater: Cornell University; United States Army War College
- Spouse: Mary A. Moxley (m. 1907–1940)
- Military career
- Service: United States Army; New York National Guard
- Service years: 1908–1917, 1919–1940 (National Guard); 1917–1919 (Army)
- Rank: Major General
- Unit: US Army Infantry Branch
- Commands: Company E, 105th Infantry Regiment; 3rd Battalion, 102nd Infantry Regiment; 2nd Battalion, 105th Infantry Regiment; 105th Infantry Regiment; Adjutant General of New York
- Conflicts: Mexican Border War; World War I Occupation of the Rhineland
- Other work: Commissioner, Schenectady Department of Public Works

Walter G. Robinson (11 April 1879 – 25 January 1940) was an engineer, businessman, and National Guard officer from New York. A veteran of the Mexican Border War, World War I, and Occupation of the Rhineland, he attained the rank of major general while serving as Adjutant General of New York, a position he held from 1934 until his death in 1940.

A native of Auburn, New York, Robinson received his CE degree from Cornell University in 1900 and worked for his family's memorial and monument business until 1906. After working on expansion of the New York State Canal System, Robinson moved to Schenectady, New York, where he became part owner of a coal retailer, worked as deputy director of the state public works department, and as Schenectady's commissioner of public works.

Robinson began his military career in 1907 as a first lieutenant in the New York National Guard's 36th Separate Company. He went on to command the company after its reorganization as Company E, 2nd Infantry Regiment. After promotion to major, he served with the regiment during the Mexican Border War. The regiment was federalized for World War I as the 105th Infantry Regiment, and Robinson served with the organization until transfer to the 1st Pioneer Infantry Regiment. Robinson took part in the major campaigns of 1918 and was promoted to lieutenant colonel shortly after the end of the war. He remained in France after the Armistice of November 11, 1918 and took part in the Occupation of the Rhineland.

Following his wartime service, Robinson assisted in reorganizing the 105th Infantry Regiment, and went on to command two of its battalions. In 1926, he was promoted to colonel and assigned as regimental commander. While commanding the regiment, he was also appointed as the New York National Guard's assistant adjutant general, and he served in both these posts until 1934. In December 1934, he was promoted to brigadier general and assigned as New York's Adjutant General. He was promoted to major general in January 1940, and died two weeks later. Robinson was buried at Fort Hill Cemetery in Auburn.

== Early life and civilian career ==
Walter George Robinson was born in Auburn, New York on 11 April 1879, a son of Walter G. Robinson and Mary T. (Keiser) Robinson. The senior Walter G. Robinson was a sculptor who owned a monument and memorial business, and his works included the monument to William H. Seward at Seward Park in Auburn, the statue of Christ on the Paul Cook Woodruff Monument at Fort Hill Cemetery in Auburn, and the monument at the Fort Hill Cemetery grave of Myles Keogh. The younger Walter Robinson attended Auburn High School and Fairfield Military Academy. He then attended Cornell University, from which he received his CE degree in 1900. After college, Robinson worked for the family business; after his father's 1906 death, Robinson and his brother continued it for several years.

Robinson also worked as an engineer on a project to expand the locks on the New York State Canal System. Among the other ventures he pursued after moving to Schenectady in 1906 was a partnership in a coal company, Robinson-Bradt Coal. In 1907, he married Mary A. Moxley; they were married until his death and had no children. In 1911, he was appointed as the state's deputy director of public works. In 1919, he was appointed as Schenectady's commissioner of public works, and he served until 1921. Robinson was a Democrat, and he served as a member of the New York State Democratic Committee.

== Early military career ==
In December 1907, Robinson joined the New York National Guard and received his commission as a first lieutenant in the Schenectady based 36th Separate Company. In December 1911, he was promoted to captain as commander of the company, which had been reorganized as Company E, 2nd Infantry Regiment. In March 1915, he was promoted to major in the 2nd Regiment. In 1916, the 2nd Regiment was federalized for service during the Mexican Border War and Robinson served on the U.S.–Mexico border from June to November.

In March 1917, the 2nd Infantry Regiment was activated for World War I as the 105th Infantry Regiment, a unit of the 27th Division. He served with the regiment at Camp Wadsworth, South Carolina, then was transferred to the 1st Pioneer Infantry Regiment. The 1st Pioneers arrived in France in July 1918, and Robinson participated in the Aisne-Marne Offensive, Oise–Aisne offensive, and Meuse–Argonne offensive. Robinson was promoted to lieutenant colonel in December 1918, shortly after the Armistice of November 11, 1918 ended the war. After the war, he took part in the Occupation of the Rhineland, and he was discharged from active duty in July 1919.

== Later military career ==
In December 1920, Robinson was appointed as a lieutenant colonel on the National Guard's reserve list, and from December 1920 to June 1921, he took part in the reorganization of the 2nd Infantry regiment while on temporary active duty. When the regiment became operational as the 105th Infantry Regiment, Robinson was commissioned as a major on its staff. In July 1922, Robinson was assigned to command the regiment's 3rd Battalion, and he remained in this position until January 1926, when he was assigned to command the 2nd Battalion. In March 1926, he was again promoted to lieutenant colonel, after which he was assigned as the 105th Infantry's executive officer and second-in-command. In July 1926, Robinson was promoted to colonel and assigned to command the regiment. While commanding the 105th Infantry, Robinson also served as the New York National Guard's assistant adjutant general, and he moved from Schenectady to Albany. In July 1926, Robinson was severely injured when his horse reared during training exercises at Camp Smith. Doctors initially feared he was near death, but he made a full recovery after several weeks of convalescence at Camp Smith's hospital and the United States Military Academy Hospital, then at home.

Robinson completed the adjutant general's course at the United States Army War College in 1927. In addition, he was elected to serve as president of the National Guard Association of New York. Robinson's fraternal and recreational memberships included the Mohawk Golf Club, Rapp–Shaw Hunting and Fishing Club of the Adirondacks, Benevolent and Protective Order of Elks, Freemasons, and American Legion. In December 1934, Robinson was promoted to brigadier general and assigned as Adjutant General of New York. On 10 January 1940, he was promoted to major general. Robinson died at the Lexington Hotel in Manhattan on 25 January 1940 after he experienced a coronary thrombosis while in the city to inspect the 69th New York Infantry Regiment. He was buried at Fort Hill Cemetery in Auburn. He was succeeded as adjutant general by Ames T. Brown.

== Dates of rank ==
Robinson's dates of rank were:

- First Lieutenant (National Guard), 13 December 1907
- Captain (National Guard), 11 December 2011
- Major (National Guard), 30 March 1915
- Major (National Army), 5 August 1917
- Lieutenant Colonel (Army of the United States), 30 December 1918
- Lieutenant Colonel (Reserve List), 24 December 1920
- Major (National Guard), 16 June 1921
- Lieutenant Colonel (National Guard), 5 March 1926
- Colonel (National Guard), 7 July 1926
- Brigadier General (National Guard), 11 December 1934
- Major General (National Guard), 10 January 1940
