= Fannie E. Hughey =

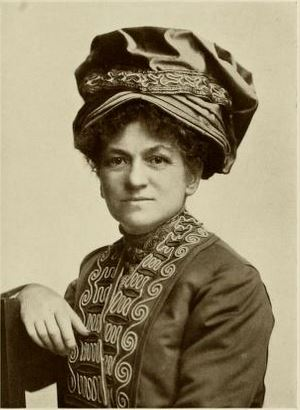
Fannie E. McKinney Hughey

Elizabeth Frances McKinney Hughey (August 4, 1857 - 1929) was a music teacher who developed the Color-Music method to teach music to children.

== Early life ==
Elizabeth Frances "Fannie" McKinney was born on August 4, 1857, in Durban, Colony of Natal, the daughter of Silas W. McKinney and Fanny Melissa Clark Nelson, foreign missionaries.

Some of her ancestors were among the early settlers in the colonies. One of these belonged to the company made interesting by Richard Mather's story of the voyage from Southampton, England, in the "James" in 1635. Thirteen of her ancestors fought in the French and Indian wars, and one, Samuel Chapin, also known as "Deacon Chapin," is an interesting figure in history and story, whose statue — the work of Augustus Saint-Gaudens, called "The Puritan" — is one of the conspicuous monuments in Springfield, Massachusetts. Two bronze copies of this may be found — one in the Dresden Gallery and the other in the Louvre, Paris, while a colossal statue of the same confronts the visitor on entering the Saint Louis Art Museum.

The qualities of the New England pioneer mingle with those of the family of Hughey's father, who were prominent in Southern New York and Northern Virginia all through the life of the colonies, and the subsequent history of the United States.

After the death of McKinney's mother in South Africa, her father was forced to return to his native land on account of the ill-health of his daughter, Fannie, and because of this urgent need, boarded the first vessel coming into port. This was a freight vessel, with a prize cargo of saltpetre for the federal army, which was in the midst of its struggle with the Southern States in the War of the Rebellion.

Hughey's education had been rather out of the regular order. Owing to poor health she spent a part of her early life in the invalid's chair or bed, and much of her time when not suffering greatly from pain and weakness was occupied in developing some subject in which she was for the time especially interested. In this way she learned how to think, how to search for desired information, and how to express herself.

At a very early age she showed great devotion to music and later became very fond of writing. Her studies during those years were carried on with frequent interruptions, which acted as a stimulus to her mental endeavor, either in private lessons with her father or small private schools; and she claimed that the intimate association with her teachers was a far better education than all the text books which she might have had. After a partial college course in the Western Seminary at Oxford, Ohio, she seemed drawn about equally toward a musical and literary career.

Following a period of sickness were four years of great activity as a teacher of music in a private school in Philadelphia. During this time she also studied piano with William H. Sherwood, and later entered the musical conservatory of Ingham University at Le Roy, New York, which was the first woman's university in the United States. From there she went to Rochester, New York, to take a special course under Mrs. C. S. P. Gary, and the following year, 1880, graduated from the Lyons Musical Academy in Lyons, New York.

The next season was spent in Boston studying musical composition and pipe organ with Whitney Eugene Thayer, and piano with William H. Sherwood. Such opportunities proved too great a temptation to her ambition and again she taxed her limited strength beyond endurance, and just as she was timidly bowing to possible success her health gave way and she was forced to abandon all hopes of concert life.

While in Philadelphia she also studied composition with Dr. Hugh A. Clarke, and rhythmic law, melodic forms, kindergarten principles and practices and various philosophical deductions with Daniel Batcheller. Some of her associates there were Ida Waugh, the child painter; Fred Waugh, the landscape artist; Theodore Presser of the Etude, and others more or less known to fame.

== Career ==
The first work in Missouri done by Hughey was in foreign missionary circles and for the Woman's Christian Temperance Union. Later when obliged to return to music teaching to help provide a home for a little son and daughter, she was surprised to find musical thought in the West not yet up to the advanced ideas which she had studied in the East before her marriage.

During this period her work in organizing and conducting the "study class" of the Union Musical Club attracted wide interest, the plan being copied by others in the National Federation of Musical Clubs, and the idea being written up by Eastern and Northern papers and magazines. This chairmanship was only resigned in order to take the presidency of the club; she is still giving practical aid to interests begun in that class.

Hughey was chairman of the Sacred Music Committee of the National Federation of Music Clubs, and edited the column "Mothers, Babes and Music," in the "Musical Monitor" — the official organ of the national organization. She was a member of, among other societies, The Society of Colonial Daughters of the XVII Century, and Daughters of the American Revolution.

== Color-Music system ==
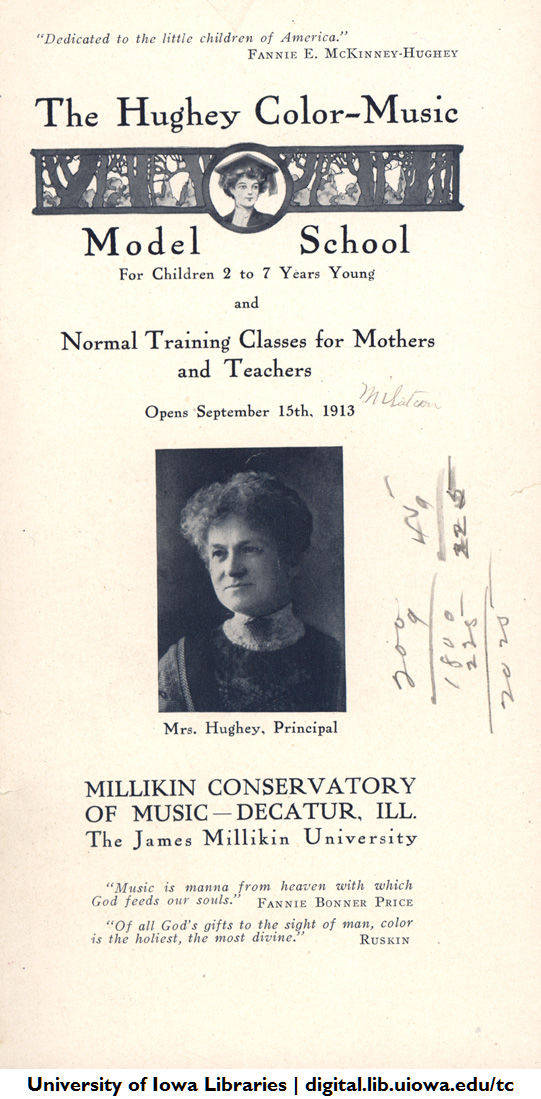
The Hughey Color-Music Model School

Hughey conducted The Hughey Color-Music Model School for children from two to seven years of age, and normal training classes for mothers and teachers at the Milliken Conservatory of Music, Decatur, Illinois. Along with the musical training went instruction in number work, nature work, bodily exercise, and for the more advanced pupils languages were taught. The training school was for those who wish to learn the Hughey system, either for teaching or for home instruction.

Fannie Hughey's book on her method of teaching music by the color system, "Color Music for Children," which was published in 1912 by G. Schirmer, New York, was calculated for and addressed to babes and kindergarten pupils. As Hughey rightly observed: "Instruction began formerly with the adult's conception of things; the object being to impart this knowledge to the child. Modern methods begin with the child's experience, and the things which interest him, and broaden out to include the whole field of learning. A child's imagination is very active and sensitive; his power of imitation is just as keen. His world is made up of imagination and imitation. If we would have him love music and desire it, we must go to him where he is, rather than expect him to come to us with our grown-up ideas."

A central feature of Hughey's method was her assertion that music instruction should begin before a child is able to walk, through play with the mother. She maintained that children aged three to five could learn music more quickly and accurately, and with greater enjoyment, than at any later age, provided they received appropriate early instruction. She contrasted this with conventional teaching methods, in which a child was seated on a stool and guided through scales and five-finger exercises under close supervision, an approach she argued was more likely to produce anxiety and discourage a lasting interest in music.

From earliest infancy children were attracted by colors; Hughey had simply taken advantage of this fact and developed a natural and logical system from it. A thorough test of the color method had been made before presenting it to the public, and the eagerness with which children took up the lessons, and their enthusiasm over the work, had amply demonstrated its practicability. By its means the drudgery attendant upon the first period of the child's musical studies was eliminated.

The method could be adopted by the mother in the nursery for the instruction of her own children; any private student could use it with a small group of children belonging to the families of friends and neighbors as an amateur instructor, and the professional music and public school teacher could apply it to their regular classes.

The part played by color was easily grasped. Tonic, Dominant and Third were the three primary colors, red, blue and yellow, respectively; the second was Orange (red plus yellow); and the fourth was Green (blue plus yellow), the Octave light red; the sixth Violet (blue and light red), and the seventh Pink (violet and light red). Instead of these technical names for the scale degrees, the Tonic Sol-fa names doh, ray, me, fah, soh, lah, te, were used, and the colors were supposed to be brought down from Rainbow Land by beautiful, bright-hued birds with sweet, soft voices that sound the several tones. The Doh-bird came down first, then the Soh-bird, and so on. The children placed the tacks corresponding in color to the several birds on the appropriate "perches" (lines or spaces); they were taught to sing the tones in perfect tune and to point out the proper "nest" (piano-key) for each bird. All this was in the spirit of happy play and innocent rivalry.

== Personal life ==
On July 19, 1888, Fannie McKinney married Rev. Albert Stinson Hughey (1856-1930) and they had two children: Albert S. Hughey Jr. and Florence Hughey.

She died in 1929 and is buried at Fort Hill Cemetery, Auburn, with her husband.
