= 9th New York Heavy Artillery Regiment =

9th New York Heavy Artillery Regiment, U.S. Volunteers
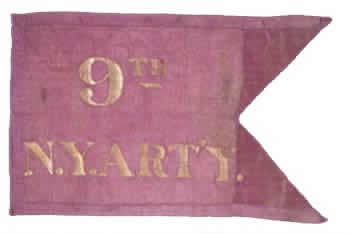
- 9th New York Heavy Artillery Flank Marker
- Active: September 6, 1862 – July 6, 1865
- Disbanded: July 6, 1865
- Country: United States
- Allegiance: Union
- Branch: Artillery
- Type: Heavy Artillery
- Role: Heavy Artillery and Infantry
- Size: 3,227 (Total Enrollment)
- Part of: XXII Corps and VI Corps
- Garrison/HQ: Fort Kearney, Fort Mansfield, Fort Simmons, Fort Bayard, Fort Gaines, Fort Foote, Fort Reno, Fort Summner, Fort Thayler, Fort Fisher (Petersburg), other forts
- Nicknames: Second Auburn Regiment, Second Wayne and Cayuga Regiment, Seward's Pets, Life Insurance Regiment
- Patron: Secretary of State William H. Seward
- Colors: Red and gold
- March: Belle Brandon
- Rifle: Smooth-bored Muskets, model 1842 (.69 caliber)
- Engagements: Overland Campaign Shenandoah Valley Campaign of 1864; Siege of Petersburg Appomattox Campaign
- Battle honours: Cold Harbor, Petersburg, Monocacy, Opequon, Cedar Creek, Petersburg, April 2d, and Sailor's Creek

Commanders
- Regimental Commander: Colonel James W. Snyder (November 28, 1864 – July 6, 1865)
- Regimental Commander: Colonel Edward P. Taft (May 21, 1864 – September 15, 1864)
- Regimental Commander: Colonel William H. Seward Jr. (May 21, 1864 – September 15, 1864)
- Regimental Commander: Colonel Joseph Welling (August 22, 1862 – May 20, 1864)
- Notable commanders: Colonel William H. Seward Jr.

Company M in 1865 in one of the Washington, DC forts

The 9th New York Heavy Artillery Regiment, U.S. Volunteers was a regiment in the American Civil War. It was one of the nine Heavy Artillery regiments to suffer over 200 killed. It is also mentioned as one of Fox's 300 Fighting Regiments.

== History ==
=== Formation and defences of Washington, D.C. ===
The regiment was originally mustered in on September 8, 1862, as the 138th New York Infantry Regiment, was quickly taken to Washington D.C. to be used in the defenses of the nation's capital. On December 19, 1862, it was redesignated as the 9th New York Heavy Artillery Regiment. On February 5, 1863, an additional Company M was created within the regiment with the transfer of the 22d N.Y. Volunteer Battery. Company L was organized in Albany between November 4 and December 9, 1863.

Amongst the regimental commanders, William H. Seward Jr. stands out as he is the son of then-Secretary of State William H. Seward. Due to this, William H. Seward visited the regiment often, and as a consequence, it gained the nickname, "Seward's Pets."

The Regiment was divided into three battalions. After the formation of the regiment, its duties were the protection of the capital. While there, it built and garrisoned Fort Mansfield, Fort Bayard, Fort Gaines, and Fort Foote until spring, 1864. A letter to the editor of the Dem. Press gives the condition of the regiment on March 11, 1864, about two months before the 9th began combat operations. The letter is taken from the New York State Military Museum and Veterans Research Center.

The 9th Artillery—their number, services, condition, &c.
Hospital Dep't, 9th N. Y. Artillery,
Fort Mansfield, Md., March 11, '64.
TO THE EDITOR DEM. PRESS:—There has been a great deal said in Lyons and vicinity respecting the number of men in the Ninth Artillery--the number ranging, as stated by different reports, at all points from eighteen hundred up to three thousand. For the information of those who are not posted, I will state that the aggregate number in the Report which was this morning sent to Brigade Headquarters was 1,674; of this number 79 are recruits who have lately arrived, and are not yet assigned to companies. The number of men in each Company is as follows: Co. A, 127; B, 147; C, 99; D, 121; E, 91; F, 132; G, 102; H, 146; I, 148; K, 147; L, 147; M, 137. These numbers, of course, do not include commissioned officers.

Allow me, also, to disabuse the minds of your readers in regard to another point. This regiment has been styled the "pet Regiment," Life Insurance Regiment, &c. Probably there is not a Regiment in the Defences of Washington that has done more fatigue duty and real hard work than the Ninth. If it has not fought as many battles as some Regiments, the work which it has done has been as valuable to the Government. Besides building Forts Simmons, Mansfield, Bayard, Gaines and Foote, (one of the largest in the Defences,) it helped build Forts Reno and Sumner, two very large Forts, and has dug miles upon miles of rifle pits and built miles upon miles of Military roads and in addition chopped over more land then a good many of the farms in Wayne County put together would compose. Notwithstanding this vast amount of "drill" with the pick, shovel and axe, Col. Welling has brought the Regiment to as high a state of discipline as can be desired. If the boys have not worked, who has?
Yours, W. L. G.

=== Combat operations ===
==== Overland Campaign ====
In May 1864, Lt. General Ulysses S. Grant took command of the Union Army, embarking on an aggressive campaign, called the Overland Campaign, against the south. Due to heavy casualties suffered by Union Army, more troops were needed to embark on the campaign. To achieve this, General Grant ordered most of the troops defending the capital, including the 9th New York Heavy Artillery, to the front to increase troop numbers. They would now be Heavy Artillery in name only, donning their rifles and assuming the duties of infantrymen. Two battalions, 1st and 2nd, of the 9th joined the VI Corps and the Army of the Potomac as infantry, while one, the 3rd battalion (Cos. C, I, L, and F), joined the Artillery Brigade. They numbered 1,944 men on May 26, 1864, as reported by Maj. Charles Burgess, before commencement of combat operations.

===== Battle of Cold Harbor =====
The 9th New York Heavy Artillery joined the VI Corps on the banks of North Anna River on May 26, 1864, and then marched to the Pamunkey during the nights of May 27 and 28. From there, it departed for Cold Harbor on May 29, guarding the wagon train along the way, where it saw its first offensive action on June 1, 1864, at the Battle of Cold Harbor, where the brigade they were part of charged at 6 pm and captured several hundred prisoners, and also managed to hold against several counterattacks on June 2. It also participated in the major attack on June 3, being placed second and third in the line of battle in Keifer's Brigade (110th Ohio and 122nd Ohio Infantry in the first line of battle, and 6th Maryland, 126th Ohio, and 138th Pennsylvania Infantry in the fourth line) in the 3rd Division, where they were ordered at 6 am to proceeded to advance 200 yards, whereupon they entrenched under heavy fire. Over the course of the Battle of Cold Harbor the 9th numbered 43 killed and mortally wounded, 99 wounded, and 6 missing, for a total of 148.

=== Timeline ===
Defense of Washington D.C. (September 1862 – May 1864)

- September 1862-August 1863: The Regiment stationed near Washington DC ( Fort Kearney, Fort Mansfield, and Fort Reno).

- August 1863 – May 1864: Construction of Fort Foote.

May 18, 1864: Joines the Army of the Potomac, begins to march torwards it

Overland Campaign (May through June 1864)

- May 26: Battle of North Anna, 9th NYHA meets up with the main body.

- May 26–28: On line of the Pamunkey River

- May 28–31: Battle of Totopotomoy Creek, 3rd battalion (Cos. C, I, L, and F) detached to join Artillery Brigade.

- June 1–12: Battle of Cold Harbor 43 killed and mortally wounded, 99 wounded, and 6 missing, total: 148

- June 1–3: Bethesda Church

- June 18-July 6: Beginning of the Siege of Petersburg
- June 22–23: Battle of Jerusalem Plank Road, Weldon Railroad Jerusalem Plank Road
- July 6–8: Move to Baltimore
- July 9: Battle of Monocacy, 51 killed, 79 wounded, 175 missing, total of 305 casualties, the highest of any regiment suffered at Monocasy.

Shenandoah Valley Campaign of 1864 (August 7 – November 28)

- August 21–22: Battle of Summit Point

- August 29: Battle of Summit Point

- September 19: Battle of Winchester, 22 killed and mortally wounded, and 20 wounded for a total of 42

- September 22: Battle of Fisher's Hill

October 3:*3rd battalion (Cos. C, I, L, and F) rejoins the regiment

- October 19: Battle of Cedar Creek, lost 64 killed and mortally :wounded and 144 wounded, for a total of 208 casualties
- October through December: Duty at Kernstown
- December 3: Moved to Washington, D.C., then to Petersburg

Siege of Petersburg (December 1864-April 1865), 15 killed

- March 25, 1865: Fort Fisher

Appomattox Campaign (March 28-April 9)

- April 2: Assault and fall of Petersburg, 4 killed

- April 5: Battle of Amelia Springs

- April 6: Battle of Sayler's Creek (also known as Sailor's Creek, Hillsman Farm, or Lockett Farm), 1 killed

- April 9: Battle of Appomattox Court House: surrender of Lee and his Army

- April 17–27: Expedition to Danville

2 men died on picket in Virginia and 2 at an unknown location. 41 died as prisoners of war.

=== Post War Activities ===
- April through June: Duty at Danville and Richmond
- June 8: Corps Review in Washington D.C.

After the war, the soldiers of the Regiment not eligible for discharge from service were transferred to the 2nd New York Heavy Artillery Regiment. They formed four companies, I, K, L and M. These men continued to provide protection for Washington, D.C. and the surrounding areas as the country moved from hostilities to peacetime.

=== Total regimental losses and calculated percentages ===
Regiment losses included 6 officers and 198 men killed or mortally wounded. 3 officers and 254 enlisted men died by disease. The total deaths were 461.

Killed and Died of Wounds: 204
Died of Disease, Accidents, etc.: 257
Died in Confederate Prisons (Previously Included): 41
Total Dead: 461
Total Wounded: 363
Total Casualties: 824

Total Percentage Dead: 14.29%
Total Percentage Killed (Previously Included): 6.32%
Total Percentage Wounded: 11.25%
Total Casualty Percentage: 25.53%

== Notable members ==
This list of notable members (in no particular order) is based on biographies given in Alfred Seelye Roe's book, The Ninth New York heavy artillery, a history of its organization, services in the defenses of Washington, marches, camps, battles, and muster-out, with accounts of life in a Rebel prison, personal experiences, names and addresses of surviving members, personal sketches, and a complete roster of the Regiment.

- Colonel William H. Seward Jr., son of Secretary of State William Henry Seward
- Private John Henry DeVoe, who married Emma Smith DeVoe, a famous Woman's Suffragist, and assisted in her campaigns.
- Major Dwight Scott Chamberlain, a surgeon during the Civil War, Medical Doctor, banker, and prominent citizen of Lyons, New York, United States.
- 1st Lieutenant Reuben Burton, prominent Reverend and businessman.
- Major George W. Brinkerhoff, assemblyman for eastern Wayne, supervisor of the town of Wolcott, abolished fees for the services of county clerks and sheriffs
- Private Alfred Seelye Roe, a teacher, author, member of the legislature for Massachusetts, and State Senator. He was also chronicler and amateur historian for the 138th New York Infantry/9th New York Heavy Artillery, and other regimental histories.

== See also ==
- List of New York Civil War units
- Roster of the 9th New York Heavy Artillery
