= Auburn Community Hospital =

New York (state) hospital system

Geography
- Location: Auburn, Cayuga County, New York, United States
- Coordinates: 42°56′29″N 76°33′53″W

Organization
- Type: General

History
- Former names: Auburn City Hospital, Auburn Memorial Hospital
- Opened: 1878

Links
- Lists: Hospitals in New York State

Auburn Community Hospital (ACH) is an acute-care medical facility in Auburn, New York. The hospital hosts a VA community-based outpatient clinic. ACH is the largest employer in Cayuga County.

== History ==
"Auburn City Hospital" was founded in 1878, helped in no small part by a bequest of $30,000 from James S. Seymour, President of the Bank of Auburn. William H. Seward Jr. was one of the incorporators. The hospital was built of the Lansing Property, former home of Rev. Dirck Cornelius Lansing of Auburn Theological Seminary.

In 1885, the construction of an annex added twenty additional beds to the original thirteen. Three years later a nursing school was added. The West Pavilion was built in 1902. In 1927, a new hospital building was completed. In 1944, ACH became the polio care center for the county. The War Memorial Wing was added in 1946, bringing the total bed capacity to 274.

In 1953, at the annual meeting of the Hospital Association, the name was changed from Auburn City Hospital to "Auburn Memorial Hospital". In 1960, the first floor of the War Memorial Wing was converted to a psychiatric unit. The following year an ICU was opened on the fourth floor of the Memorial Wing. The nursing home extended care unit was opened in 1966. With the opening of a nursing curriculum at Auburn Community College, the School of Nursing closed. In 2022 The hospital established The Auburn Community Hospital Nursing Student Angel Fund to assist with funding for Nursing program students’ transportation to campus and to their clinical assignments.

In 2012 Auburn Memorial Hospital changed its name to "Auburn Community Hospital", nominally to reflect the stronger connections which the hospital was developing through the communities in the Finger Lakes Region.

== Present day ==
ACH is a Health Care Delivery System that includes the Hospital, an 80-bed Long Term Care and Rehabilitation Center, 3 Urgent Care Centers, as well as Primary Care and Specialty Care Services. The hospital has a heliport. In the Fall, ACH sponsors a Women's Health Expo generally held at the Holiday Inn.

In 2017 the hospital signed an agreement with St. Joseph's Health (Syracuse, New York) and the University of Rochester Medical Center (URMC) to share services with each maintaining their own identity and independence: This includes retaining the name "Auburn Community Hospital" (ACH).

In 2019, hospital administration was criticized for being slow to investigate complaints regarding a doctor's inappropriate and allegedly abusive behavior. A lawsuit was later filed alleging the doctor's carelessness caused a patient's death, The doctor is no longer employed at ACH.

In 2021, the NY Health foundation awarded Auburn Community Hospital (ACH) a grant to support the launch of a rural residency program to address physician shortages and improve health care access for rural residents in Central New York. In July 2022, it was announced that the hospital plans to construct a Radiation Treatment Center. "When the expansion is finished, patients will no longer need to drive to Syracuse or Rochester for treatment..."
