= Dylan Seward =

American baseball player (born 2008)

Norco High School
- Shortstop
- Born: September 9, 2008 (age 18)
- Bats: Switch Throws: Right

Dylan Seward (born September 9, 2008) is an American high school baseball shortstop.

== Career ==
Seward attends Norco High School in Norco, California. As a junior in 2026, he hit .436/.519/.727 with seven home runs and 17 stolen bases. During the Summer after that season, he played in the High School All-American Game. He also played for USA Baseball's 18U National Team.

Seward is considered one of the top prospects for the 2027 Major League Baseball draft and the potential number one overall pick. He is committed to play college baseball at the University of Tennessee.
