= William H. Seward Jr. =

US Army general (1839–1920)

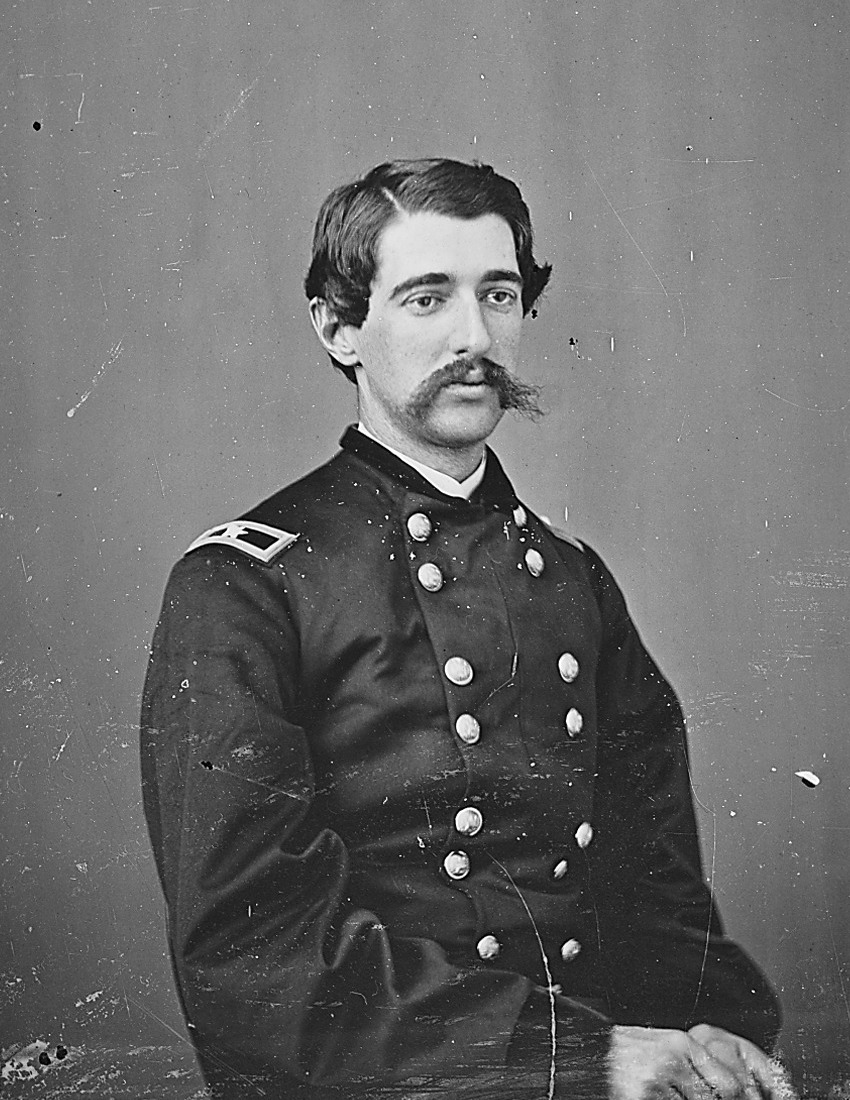
- Portrait by Brady c. 1862–1865

Personal details
- Born: William Henry Seward Jr. June 18, 1839 Auburn, New York, U.S.
- Died: April 29, 1920 (aged 80) Auburn, New York, U.S.
- Resting place: Fort Hill Cemetery, Auburn, New York
- Spouse: Janet MacNeil Watson
- Children: 3
- Parent(s): William H. Seward; Frances Adeline Miller

Military service
- Allegiance: United States of America; Union
- Branch/service: United States Army; Union Army
- Years of service: 1862–1865
- Rank: Brigadier General
- Commands: 9th New York Heavy Artillery Regiment
- Battles/wars: American Civil War

William Henry Seward Jr. (June 18, 1839 – April 29, 1920) was an American banker and brigadier general in the Union Army during the American Civil War. He was the youngest son of William H. Seward, the United States Secretary of State under Abraham Lincoln and Andrew Johnson.

== Early life ==
Seward was born in Auburn, New York. His father, William Henry Seward Sr., had just taken office as Governor of New York when he was born, and his mother, Frances Adeline Seward, was the daughter of Judge Elijah Miller, a law partner of Seward who had built the family home in Auburn in 1816. His elder brothers were Augustus Henry Seward, a brevet colonel in the Paymaster Corps, and Frederick William Seward, who served as Assistant Secretary of State to his father.

== Career ==
=== Banking ===
Educated at home, Seward became interested in finance and later started a partnership with Clinton McDougall, was private secretary to his father, then a U.S. Senator from New York, in 1860, and opened a private bank in Auburn in 1861. He left banking on August 22, 1862, to join the Union Army in the U.S. Civil War.

=== Military career ===
Seward was appointed lieutenant colonel of New York's 138th Infantry Regiment, which became the 9th New York Heavy Artillery Regiment in December 1862. The regiment served in the defenses of Washington, D.C. until it was converted back to an infantry regiment and sent to the Army of the Potomac because of the losses sustained by that army in the Overland Campaign. After fighting at the Battle of Cold Harbor, Seward was appointed colonel of the regiment on June 10, 1864.

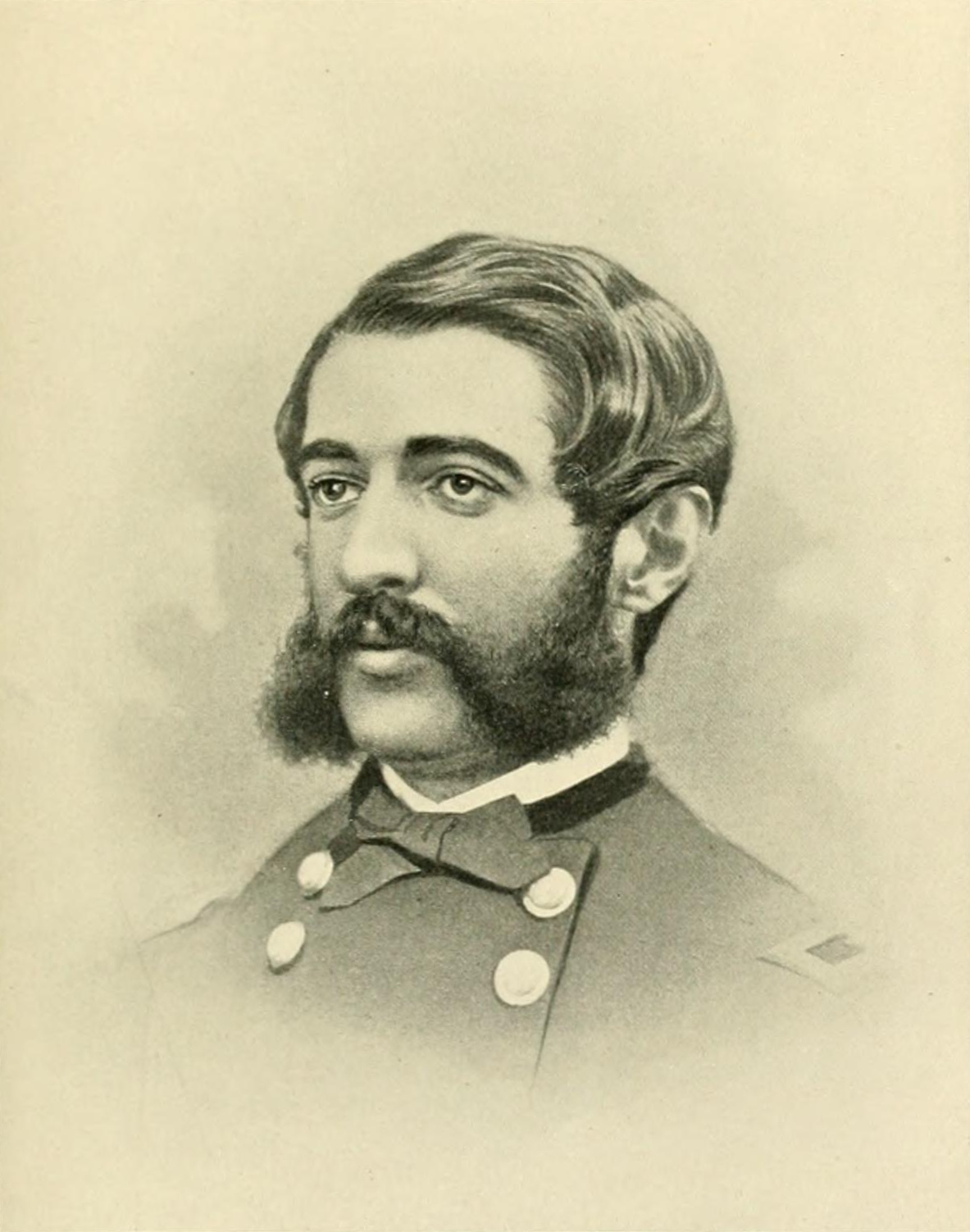
Seward shortly after his promotion to Brigadier General in 1864

A few weeks after Seward's promotion to colonel, his regiment was sent north to meet the threat to Washington, D.C. posed by Confederate Lieutenant General Jubal Early's Valley Campaigns of 1864. Seward was slightly wounded in his arm and suffered a broken leg when his horse fell on him after the horse was shot at the Battle of Monocacy on July 9, 1864. He was promoted to brigadier general on September 13, 1864, and in January 1865 was assigned to command a brigade in the Department of West Virginia, which he did until April 1865. He was thereafter known within his family as "The General". Seward commanded the 3rd Division for 6 days after Confederate partisan rangers captured Brigadier General George Crook on February 20, 1865.

=== Post-military career ===
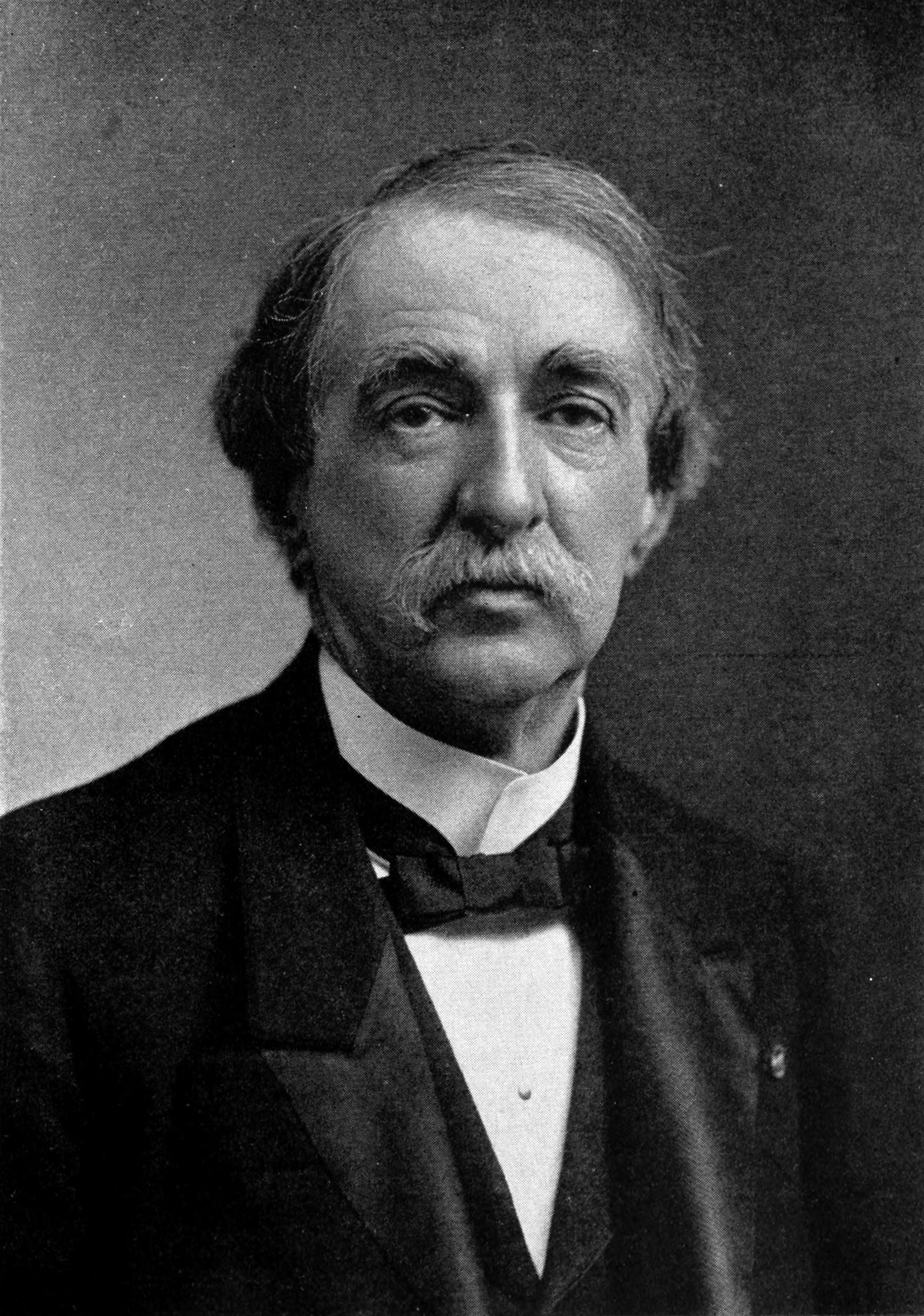
Seward c. 1913

Seward resigned his commission on June 1, 1865. After the war, Seward returned to banking and lived with his wife in the family homestead in Auburn, New York. In addition to his banking career, he engaged in politics, charitable work, and patriotic and historic societies and he became a director of several corporations. In 1875, he was one of the incorporators of the Auburn City Hospital.

In 1886, he was elected as a companion of the New York Commandery of the Military Order of the Loyal Legion of the United States and was assigned insignia number 4696.

== Personal life ==
Seward married Janet MacNeil Watson (1839–1913), with whom he had three children:

- Cornelia Margaret Seward Allen (1862–1921)
- William Henry Seward III (November 10, 1864 – February 16, 1951)
- Frances Janet Seward Messenger (1880–1957)

William Henry Seward Jr. died in Auburn, New York, on April 26, 1920, at the age of 80, and is buried in Auburn's Fort Hill Cemetery, next to his father.

== See also ==
- List of American Civil War generals (Union)
