= Frances Adeline Seward =

First Lady of New York

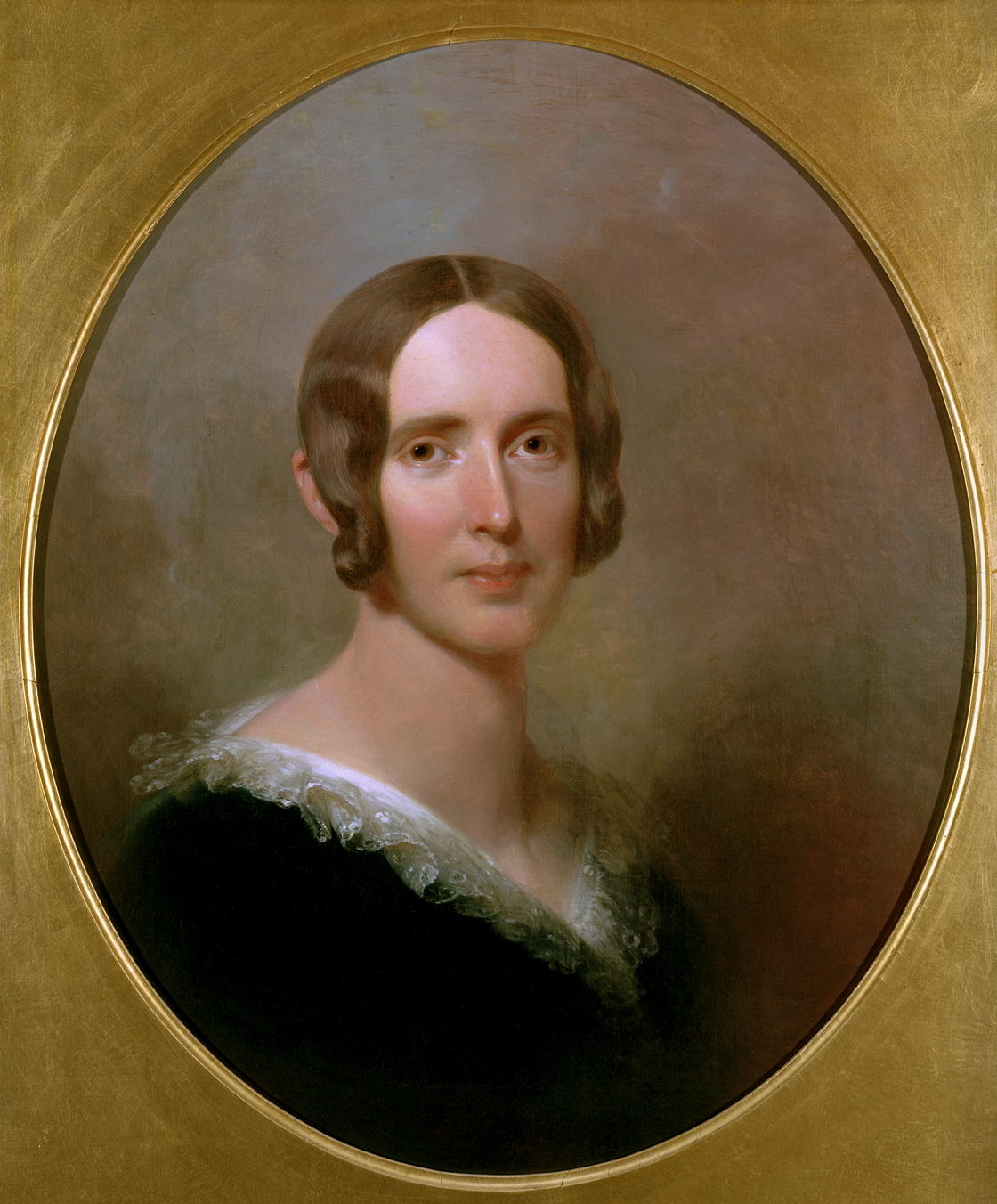
- Frances Adeline Seward in 1844

First Lady of New York
- In role January 1, 1839 – December 31, 1842
- Governor: William H. Seward
- Preceded by: Dolly Newell Marcy
- Succeeded by: Catharine Lawyer Bouck

Personal details
- Born: Frances Adeline Miller; September 25, 1805 Cayuga County, New York, U.S.
- Died: June 21, 1865 (aged 59) Washington, D.C., U.S.
- Spouse: William H. Seward (m. 1824)
- Children: 5, including Augustus, Frederick, William Jr., and Frances
- Education: Troy Female Seminary

Frances Adeline Seward (née Miller; September 25, 1805 – June 21, 1865) was the First Lady of New York and the wife of William Henry Seward, a senator in the New York legislature, Governor of New York, a senator from New York and United States Secretary of State under President Abraham Lincoln.

== Early life ==
Frances Adeline Miller was born on September 25, 1805, in Cayuga County, New York. She was the daughter of Judge Elijah Miller (1772–1851) and Hannah Foote Miller (1778–1811), who was born in Williamstown, Massachusetts. She studied at the Troy Female Seminary (now known as Emma Willard School).

== Life ==
Frances was deeply committed to the abolitionist movement. In the 1850s, the Seward family opened their Auburn home as a safehouse to fugitive slaves on the Underground Railroad. Seward's frequent travel and political work suggest that it was Frances who played the more active role in Auburn abolitionist activities. In the excitement following the rescue and safe transport of fugitive slave William "Jerry" Henry in Syracuse on October 1, 1851, Frances wrote to her husband, "two fugitives have gone to Canada—one of them our acquaintance John."

Another time she wrote, "A man by the name of William Johnson will apply to you for assistance to purchase the freedom of his daughter. You will see that I have given him something by his book. I told him I thought you would give him more." In early 1859, the Sewards sold a small piece of land on the outskirts of Auburn to the well-known former slave and activist Harriet Tubman, with whom the Sewards were well-acquainted.

Frances also played a crucial role in her husband's political and legal decisions. For example, during the 1846 Freeman trial in Auburn, New York, William H. Seward acted as the defense lawyer for William Freeman, an African American man charged with murdering four members of the Van Nest family. Before agreeing to represent Freeman in court, Frances and William were consistently harassed by Auburnites not to defend Freeman. Ultimately, it was because of Frances's appeal, and adamant belief that Freeman was in fact insane in order to commit such a crime without a clear motive, that her husband declared his intention to defend Freeman in court.

=== Assassination attempt ===
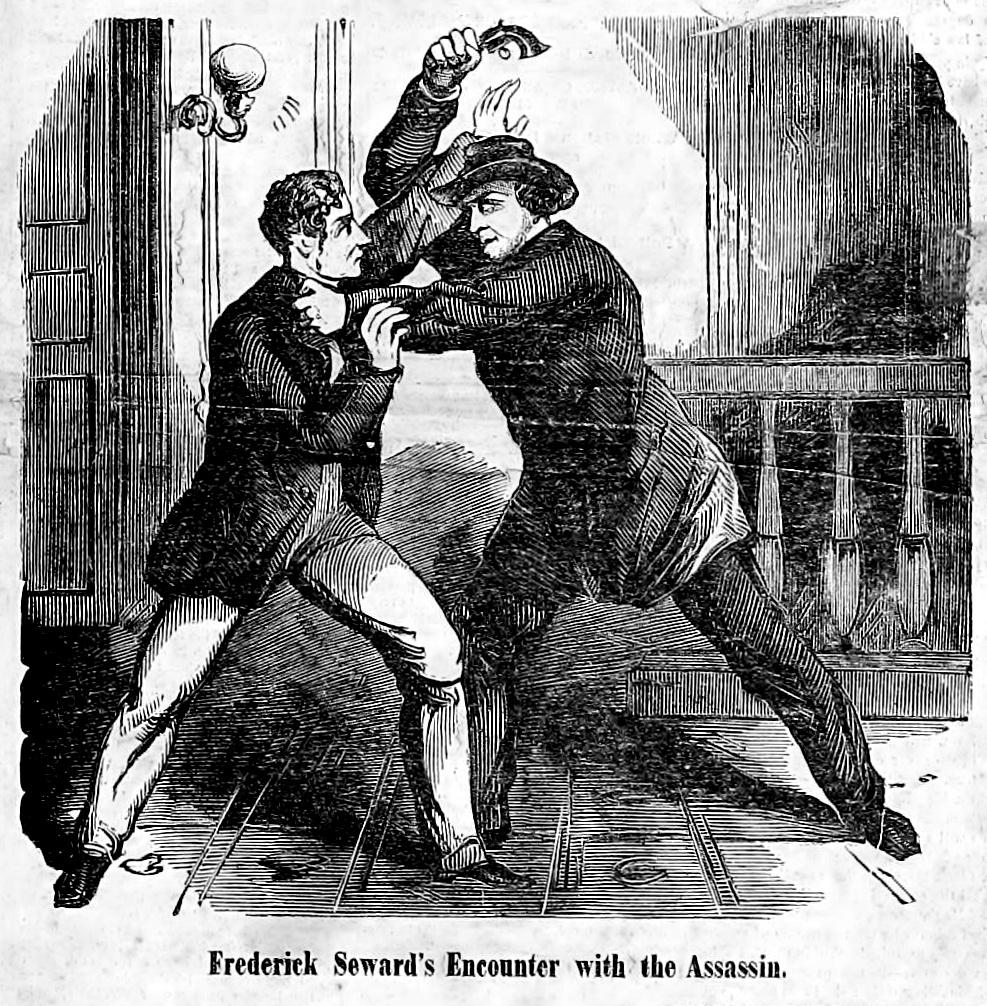
Lewis Powell attacking Frederick Seward after attempting to shoot him

On April 14, 1865, Frances's husband and three of their children (Frederick, Augustus, and Fanny) were injured in an assassination attempt on her husband in their house.

The man responsible was Lewis Powell, a conspirator of John Wilkes Booth. Booth had shot President Lincoln the same night; Lincoln died early the next morning. The attack put Frances into a state of great anxiety about her family. She feared Frederick would die of his injuries, although he survived.

== Personal life ==
On October 20, 1824, Frances Adeline Miller married New York attorney William Henry Seward (1801–1872), after meeting him through his sister, a classmate, in 1821. Her life and growing awareness as a "sub-rosa abolitionist" and champion of women's rights, is portrayed in the nonfiction book "The Agitators: Three Friends Who Fought for Abolition and Women's Rights." The couple raised five children:

- Augustus Henry Seward (1826–1876)
- Frederick William Seward (1830–1915)
- Cornelia Seward (1836–1837), who died young of smallpox.
- William Henry Seward Jr. (1839–1920)
- Frances Adeline "Fanny" Seward (1844–1866)

Frances died on June 21, 1865, of a heart attack, two months after the assassination attempt. She was buried at Fort Hill Cemetery in Auburn, New York.

Honorary titles
Preceded by Dolly Newell Marcy	First Lady of New York; 1839–1843	Succeeded by Catharine Lawyer Bouck
