= Samuel S. Seward =

American politician

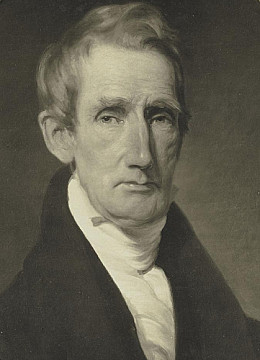
- Samuel S. Seward
- Born: December 5, 1768; Hardyston Township, New Jersey, US
- Died: August 24, 1849 (aged 80)
- Occupations: Physician, businessman, jurist, and politician

Samuel Sweezy (Swezy) Seward (December 5, 1768 – August 24, 1849) was an American medical doctor, businessman, jurist, and politician.

== Early life ==
Samuel Sweezy Seward was born in Hardyston Township, New Jersey, the third son of John and Mary (Swayze) Seward. The early years of his life were spent in Morris County, New Jersey.

== Career ==
Around 1800, Seward settled in Florida, New York, in Orange County, New York, where he practiced medicine, was a land speculator, and owned a mercantile business. Seward studied medicine at Columbia University.

Samuel S. Seward was also active in politics and government. In 1804, Seward served in the New York State Assembly. In 1815, he became a judge of the Orange County, New York Court and subsequently served as First Judge, a position he held for seventeen years.

Records indicate Seward amassed a substantial fortune by the 1840s, some of which was devoted to philanthropic endeavors. In 1846, Seward established the S. S. Seward Institute. He created a $20,000 endowment for the institute and provided for the purchase of land and the erection of the school building.

== Personal life ==
Seward married Mary Jennings of Goshen, New York in 1795, and they had five children together, including:

- William H. Seward (1801–1872), who served as governor of New York State (1839–1842), a United States senator (1849–1861), and United States Secretary of State in the administrations of Abraham Lincoln and Andrew Johnson (1861–1869).

Seward died on August 24, 1849.
