= Bill Seward =

American sportscaster (1958–2022)

Bill Seward (June 26, 1958 – January 14, 2022) was an American broadcaster, actor, and coach. In addition to calling various professional and college sports in America, Seward has been “on the mic” for NBC’s Summer and Winter Olympic coverage, Rugby World Cup on NBC, Rugby World Cup Sevens on NBC Sports Network, Varsity Cup, Red Bull Cliff Diving World Series, FIS Alpine Skiing World Cup, FIS Nordic Skiing World Cup, European Figure Skating Championships, FINA Synchronized Swimming World Cup, Vuelta a Espana, Eneco Cycling Tour, Tour of Belgium, Tour of Norway, 4 Days of Dunkirk, Paris Marathon, IBU Biathlon World Championships, Tour de Ski and the Four Hills World Cup ski jumping event. Seward is the host of "Robot Wars" on Discovery Science and has appeared on NBC’s "Early Today" along with programs on MSNBC, CNBC, USA Network, Universal Sports and the horse racing networks HRTV and TVG.

== Broadcasting career ==
At CBS Radio in Los Angeles, Seward has earned several Golden Mikes and multiple "Best Radio Anchor Staff" awards, the top honor presented by the Southern California Sports Broadcasters. He also anchored pregame segments on the Dodgers Radio Network and hosted the postgame call-in show, Dodger Talk. Seward has been voted "Top Sports Update Anchor" a record 13 times by the Los Angeles Daily News.

He previously anchored at ESPN on such shows as SportsCenter, ESPNEWS, and 2Day at the Races. He was also part of ESPN's coverage of the 1984 Summer Olympic Games in Los Angeles. While at ESPN, Seward was a regular contributor to ABC World News This Morning. Seward was the Sports Director at KVIQ in Eureka, California. He also worked for KTIE in Oxnard, California, and WNHT in Concord, New Hampshire before returning to his hometown to become an award-winning anchor at KCBS-TV and KNX-AM in Los Angeles.

== Acting ==
In addition to his broadcasting career, Seward has been featured in Danny Boyle's Steve Jobs, Dan Gilroy's Nightcrawler, David Fincher’s Zodiac and Jay Roach's Recount, along with appearances on television shows Modern Family, I'm Dying Up Here, It's Always Sunny In Philadelphia, Scandal, Key & Peele, Revenge, Touch, Monk, Everybody Hates Chris, Medium, Numbers, and several others. Seward is also the host of Sega's popular video game, Virtua Fighter 5.

== Personal life ==
A graduate of Loyola Marymount University, Seward was the youngest head football coach in the nation at Saint Bernard High School in Playa del Rey, California, where he was honored as "Bay Area Coach of the Year." Seward coached at Saint Bernard and at Notre Dame High School in Sherman Oaks, California, and had the privilege of working with several future MLB, NBA and NFL players.

Seward died on January 14, 2022, at the age of 63.
