= Fort Hill Cemetery =

Founded in 1851 in Auburn, New York

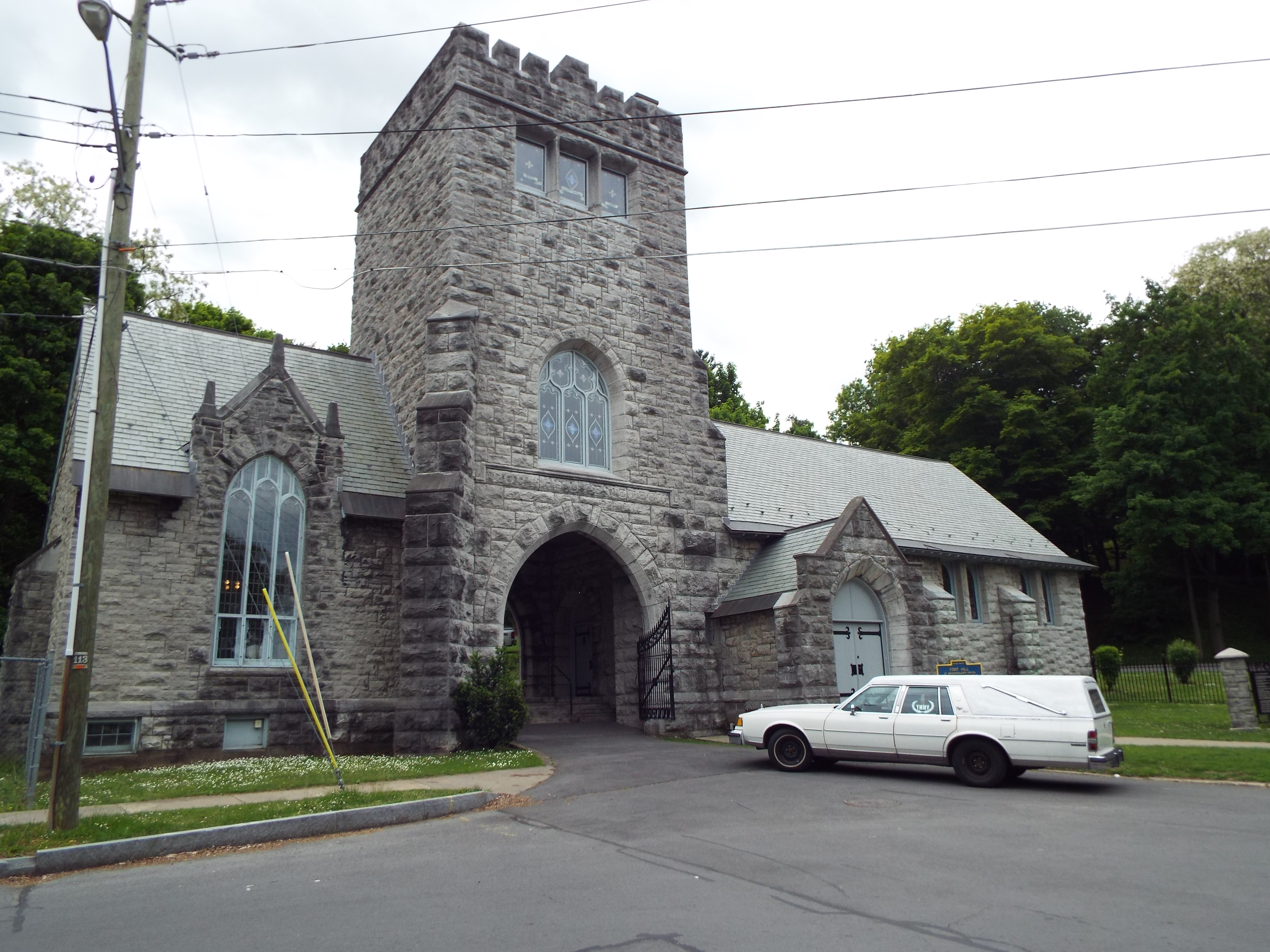
- Gatehouse
- Interactive map of Fort Hill Cemetery

Details
- Established: 1851 (Chapel built in 1893)
- Location: 19 Fort St, Auburn, New York
- Coordinates: 42°55′29″N 76°34′18″W
- Style: Gothic Revival
- Website: www.forthillcemetery.net

Fort Hill Cemetery is a cemetery located in Auburn, New York, United States. It was incorporated on May 15, 1851, under its official name: "Trustees of the Fort Hill Cemetery Association of Auburn". It is known for its headstones of notable people such as former Secretary of State William H. Seward, his son, William H. Seward Jr. and abolitionist and freedom fighter Harriet Tubman. It is built on what was once a fortified village of the Cayuga Nation. The cemetery features a 56 ft (17 m). high limestone obelisk monument to Chief Logan, famed chief of the Haudenosaunee.

== Notable burials ==
The cemetery features headstones of such notable people as:

- Elizabeth Hazelton Haight, a pioneering early female classicist, who worked at Vassar College.
- Myles Walter Keogh, civil war Brevet Lt. Colonel; fell at the Battle of the Little Bighorn with Custer.
- Fannie E. McKinney-Hughey, music teacher who developed the Color-Music method to teach music to children.
- Benjamin C. Mead, United States Attorney for the Northern District of New York.
- Thomas Mott Osborne, Warden of Sing Sing
- Sereno E. Payne (1843–1914), U.S. Representative and House Majority Leader
- Walter G. Robinson (1879–1940), Adjutant General of New York
- Frances Adeline Seward, wife of William H. Seward and abolitionist
- William H. Seward, New York Governor, Senator and U.S. Secretary of State
- William H. Seward Jr., banker and brigadier general in the Union Army during the American Civil War
- Harriet Tubman, who is resting on Fort Hill Cemetery's "West Lawn C", beneath a large tree with two small bushes on each side of her headstone
- Martha Coffin Wright, feminist, abolitionist, and signatory of the Declaration of Sentiments.

=== Other ===
The Bradley Mortuary Chapel (which also serves as the cemetery office and gatehouse) was designed by the architect Julius A. Schweinfurth in a Gothic Revival style and completed in 1893. Julius A. Schweinfurth was a brother and partner to Charles F. Schweinfurth.

== Gallery ==
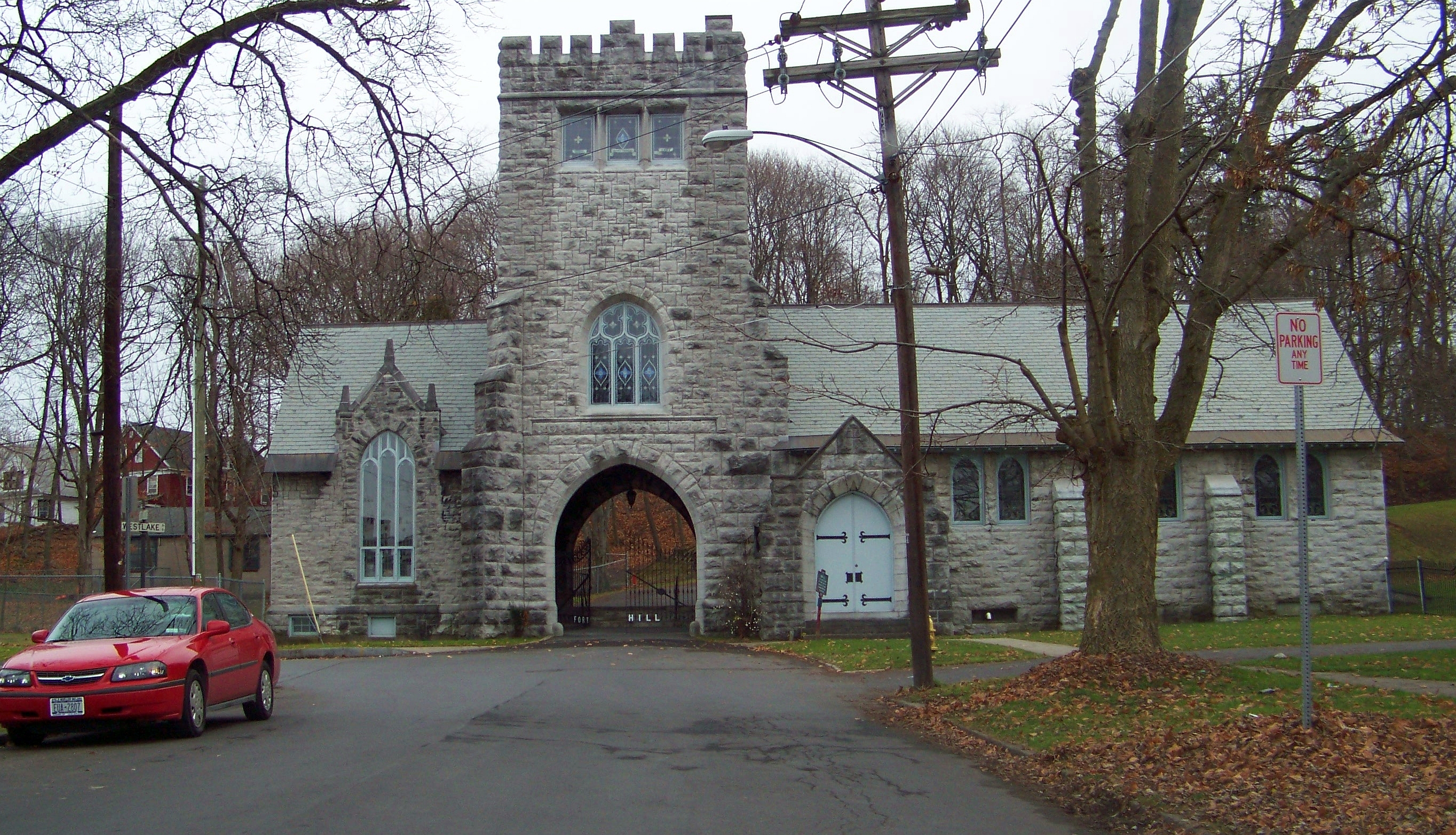
Gate

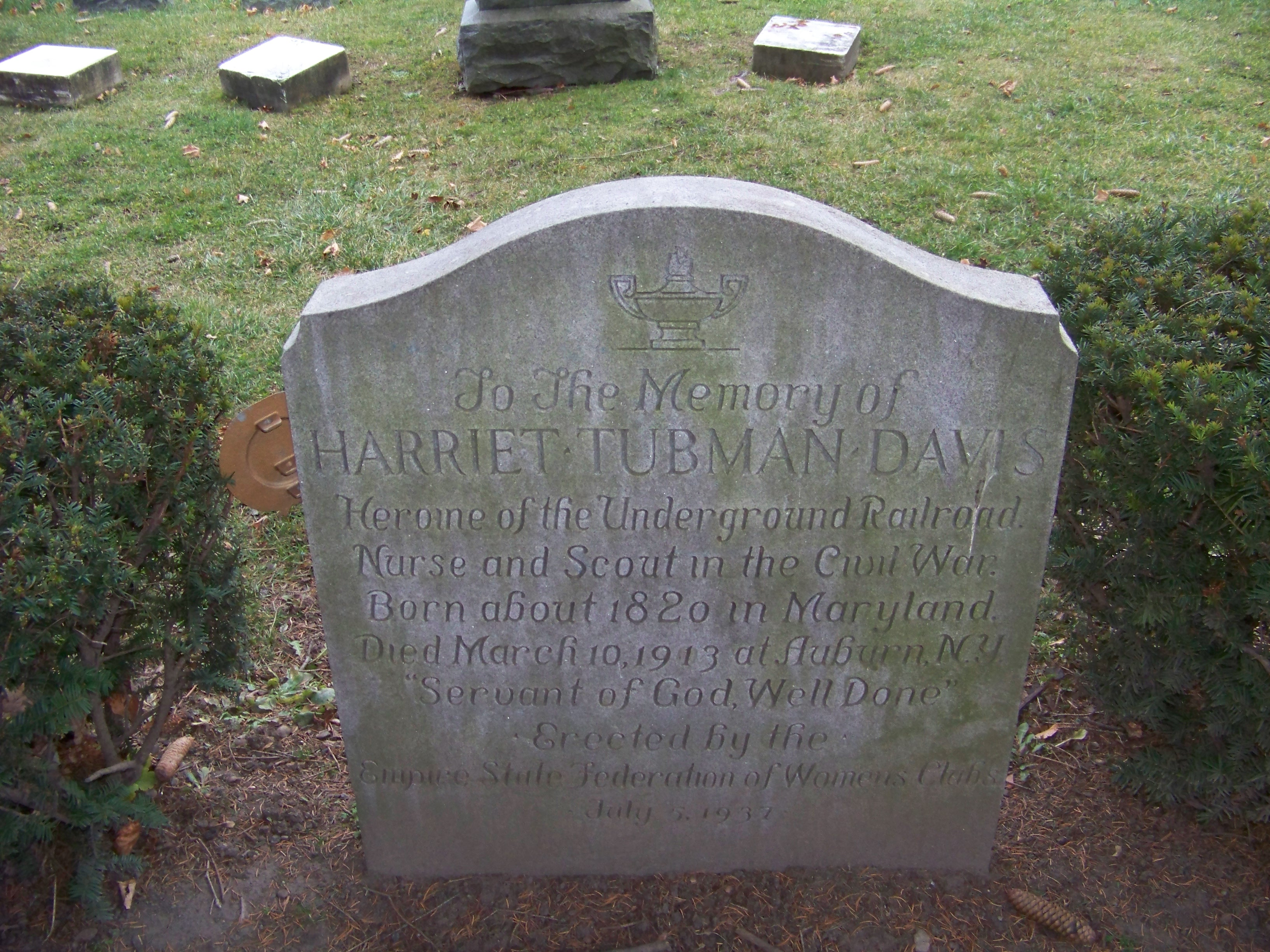
The Harriet Tubman Grave is listed on the National Register of Historic Places

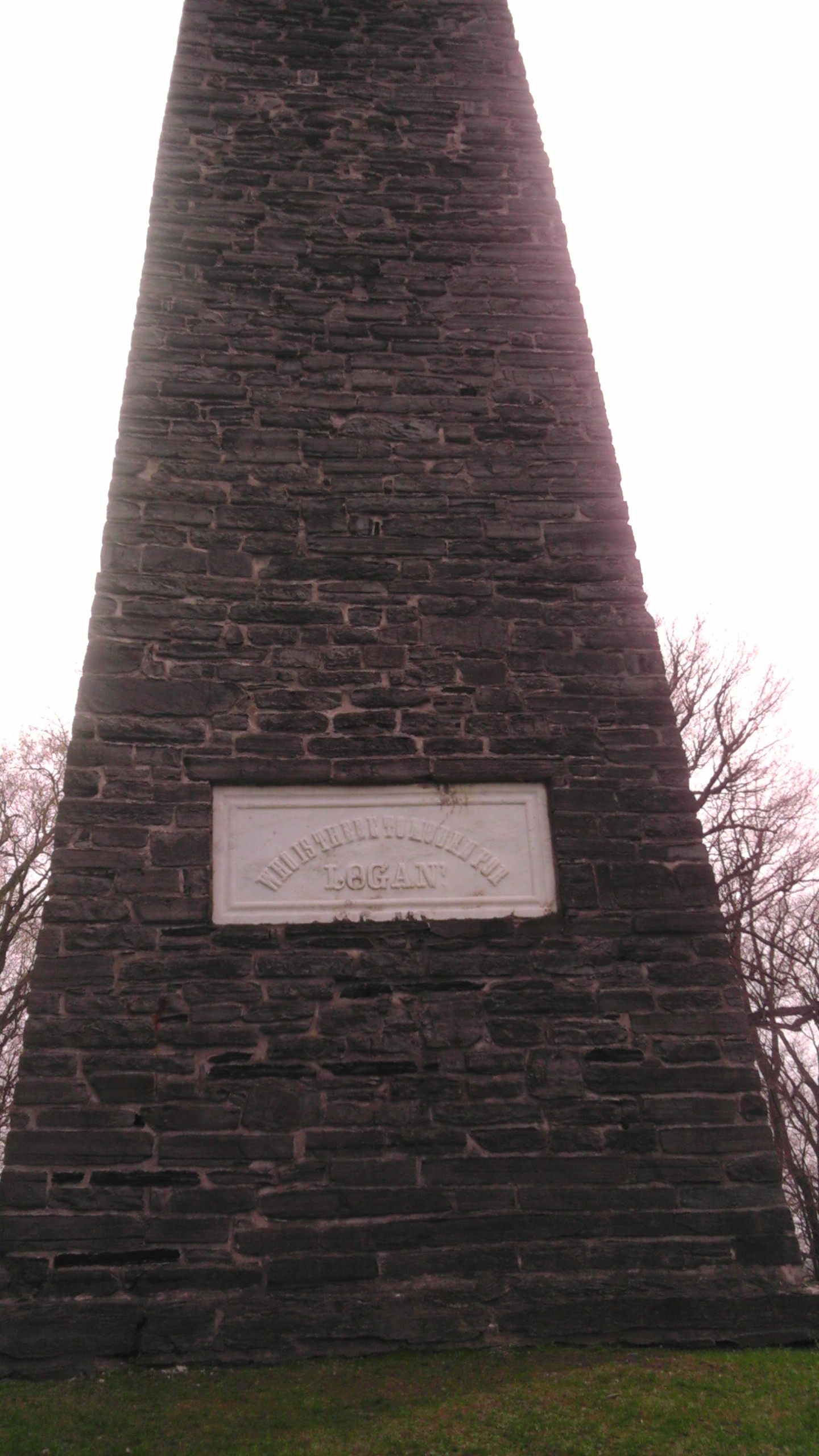
Monument to Chief Logan at Fort Hill Cemetery

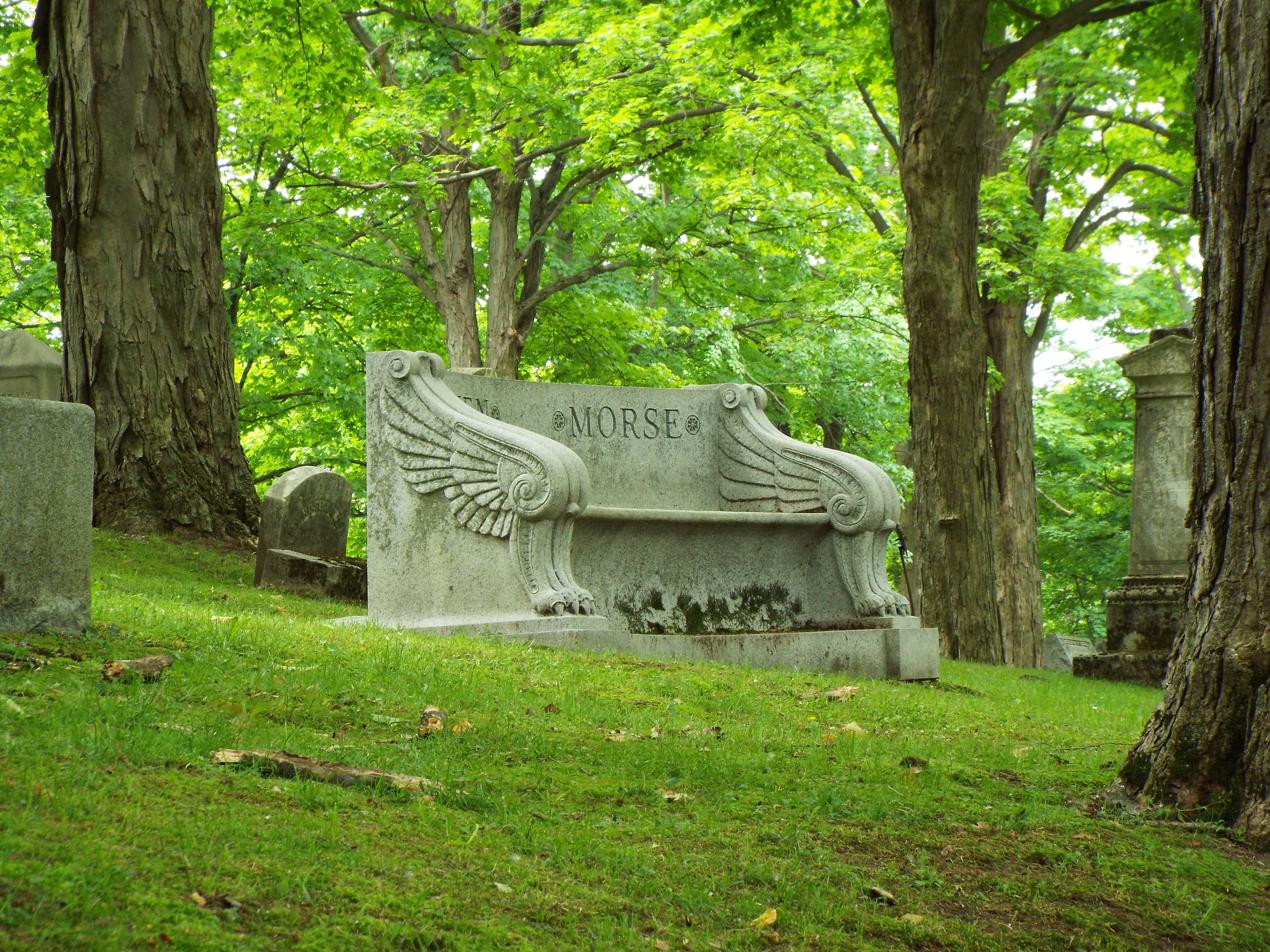
Morse bench in Fort Hill Cemetery

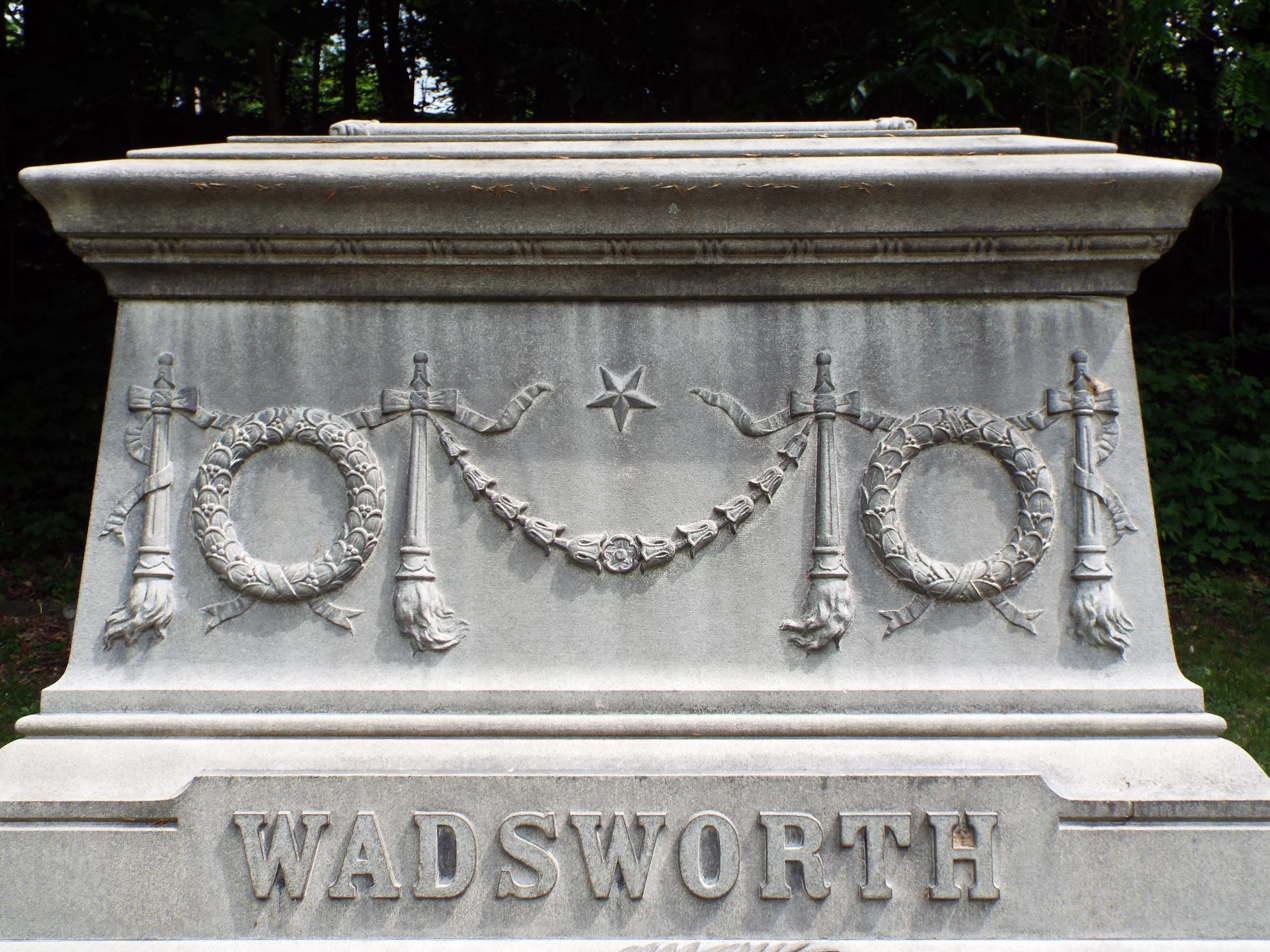
Wadsworth memorial

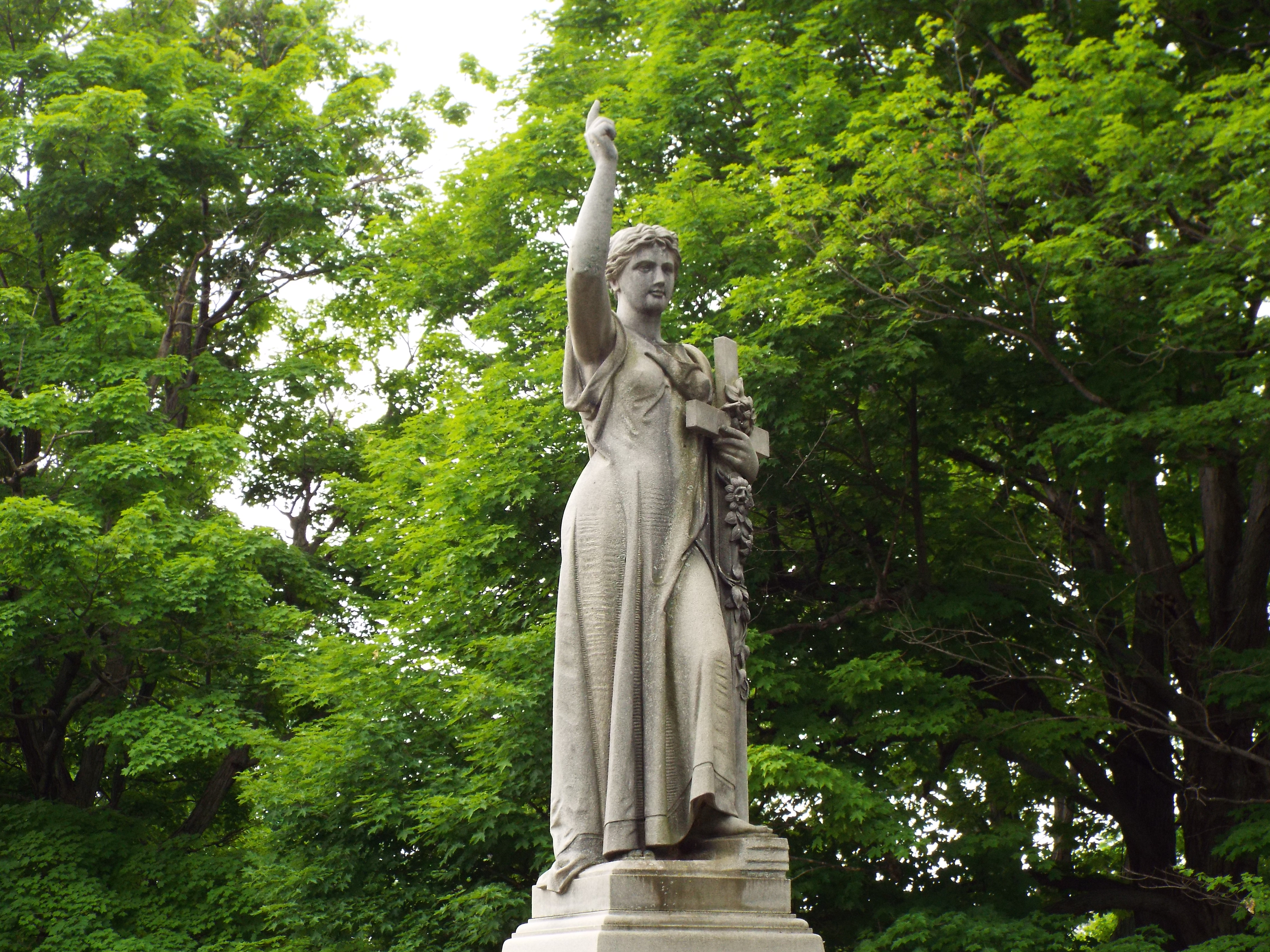
Corning memorial

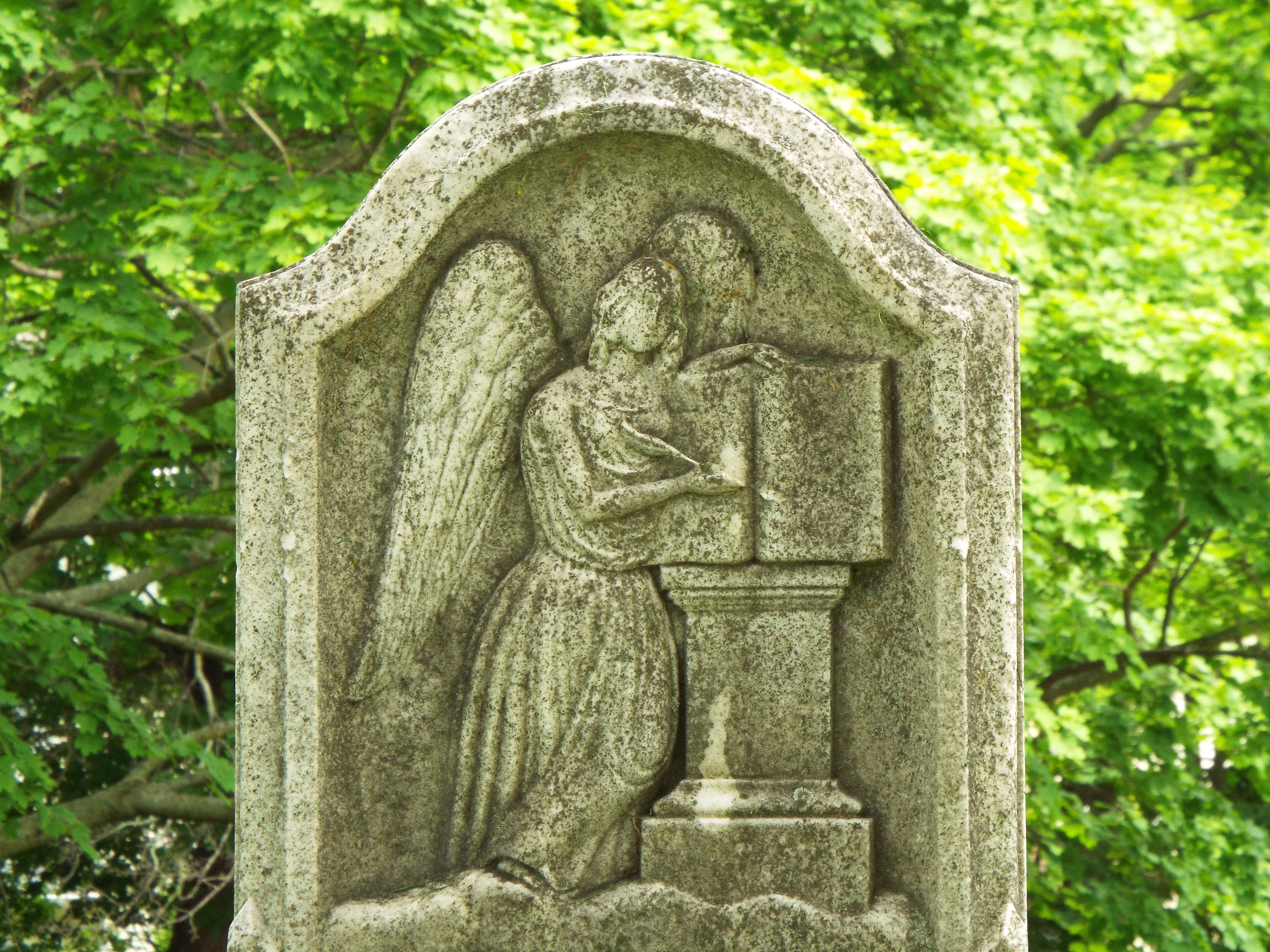
Angel headstone scene

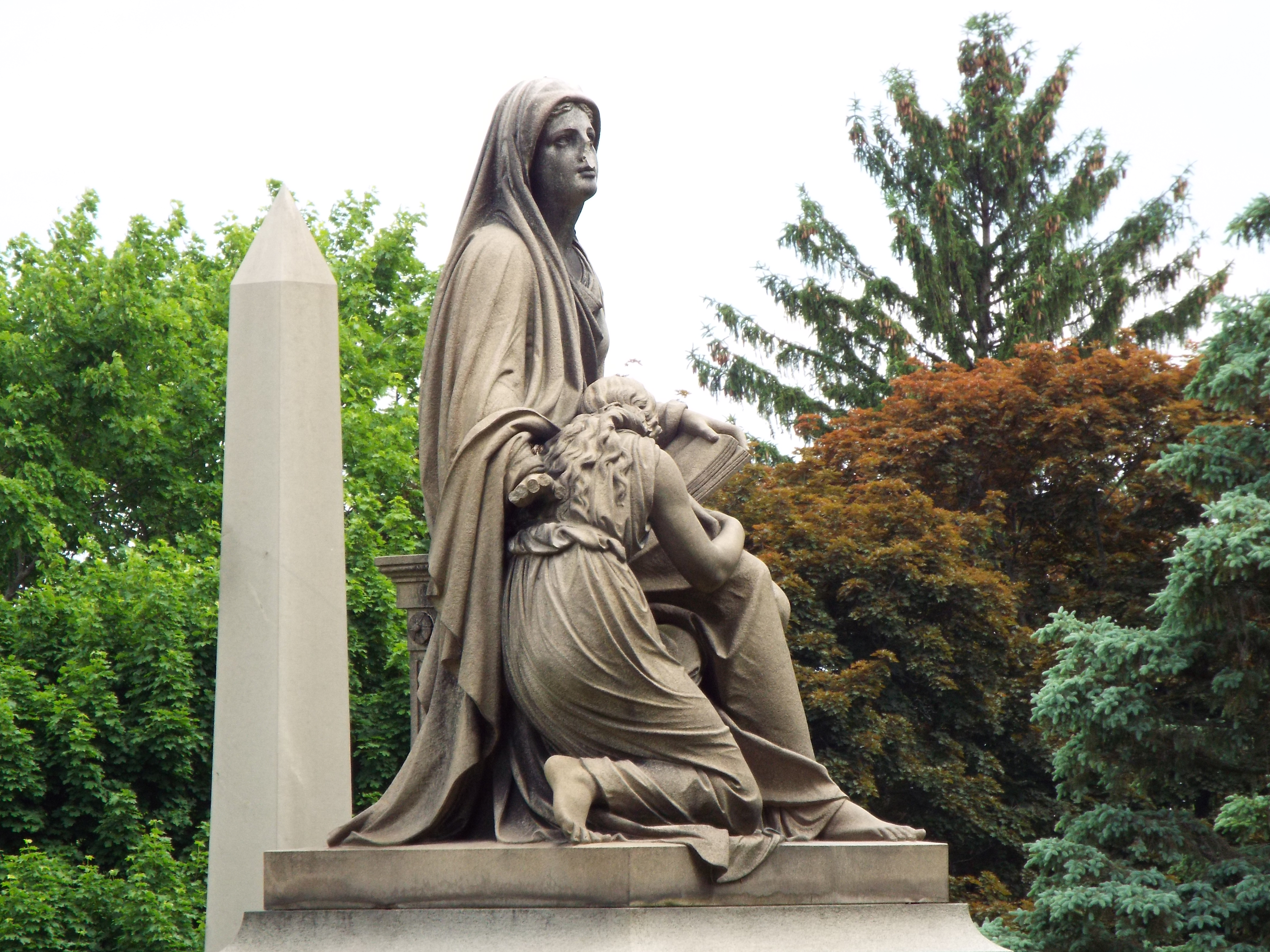
Case & Willard memorial
