= William H. Bell =

William H. Bell may refer to:

- William Bell (photographer) (1830–1910), English-born American photographer
- William H. Bell (Wisconsin politician) (1863–1937), member of the Wisconsin State Assembly
- William Henry Bell (1873–1946), English composer
- William Henry Bell (businessman), businessman and politician in Hong Kong
- William Henry Dillon Bell (1884–1917), New Zealand politician
- William H. Bell (servant), African-American servant of William Seward
- William Hemphill Bell (1834–1906), US Army brigadier general
