= 17th Michigan Infantry Regiment =

- Michigan state flag
- Active: August 8, 1862, to June 3, 1865
- Country: United States (Union)
- Allegiance: Michigan
- Branch: United States Army
- Type: Infantry
- Size: 1,079 officers and men at beginning of service
- Engagements: Battle of South Mountain; Battle of Antietam; Battle of Fredericksburg; Siege of Vicksburg; Knoxville Campaign; Battle of the Wilderness; Battle of Spotsylvania Court House; Battle of Cold Harbor; Siege of Petersburg; Appomattox Campaign

The 17th Michigan Infantry Regiment was an infantry regiment that served in the Union Army during the American Civil War.

== Service ==
The 17th Michigan Infantry was organized at Detroit, Michigan, between August 8 and 22, 1862. Most of the soldiers in the regiment were from south-central Michigan, and Company E was composed largely of students from Michigan State Normal College, today known as Eastern Michigan University. Due to the large number of students in its ranks, Company E acquired the nickname "Normal Company". They trained at Fort Wayne under their first commander, Colonel William H. Withington, until August 27 when they left for Maryland.

At the Battle of South Mountain, Maryland, on September 14, 1862, the regiment saw its first major action. Although they took heavy casualties, the 17th performed well for an untried unit and earned the nickname "Stonewall Regiment". Three days later, they participated in the Battle of Antietam as part of the 1st Brigade, 1st Division, IX Corps. After the battle, the regiment left with its command and returned to Virginia.

In October 1863, the regiment was assigned to the Army of the Tennessee. On October 14, 1863, the regiment, then attached to the 3rd Brigade, 1st Division, IX Corps, marched from Knoxville to Loudon, Tennessee, to oppose the advance of the Confederate General James Longstreet. It lay under its arms during the night, and on the following morning commenced falling back closely followed by the Confederates. It continued to retreat, acting as a rear guard for the rest of the corps. While crossing Turkey Creek, Longstreet's men attacked in force, causing a severe engagement to occur. In this action, the regiment lost 7 men killed, 19 wounded and 10 missing. During the retreat to Knoxville and during the siege the men suffered greatly, especially while being besieged from the want of proper and sufficient rations. When the siege was lifted by the retreating Confederates, the 17th was ordered to Annapolis, Maryland, where 200 new recruits were incorporated into its ranks.

From Annapolis, the regiment set out with Ulysses S. Grant's campaign of 1864; when in May of that year it lost 7 men killed, and 39 wounded in the Battle of the Wilderness. On May 12, 1864, the 17th Michigan was actively engaged in the Battle of Spotsylvania Court House, and charged the southern Confederate works at Spotsylvania Court House. In this charge the regiment lost 23 killed, 73 wounded and 93 taken prisoner. The loss in prisoners was owing to the regiment being surrounded by a greatly superior force under the command of Longstreet.

On May 16, 1864, the regiment was designated as an engineer unit, and served in that capacity the remainder of the year. It moved with its corps from the North Anna River, thence to Cold Harbor, across the Chickahominy and the James Rivers to the Siege of Petersburg, where it remained until the city fell. From the time it arrived in front of Petersburg until its fall, the Regiment was actively building and reconstructing fortifications, all the while being held in reserve, if needed as infantry.

After Lee's surrender at Appomattox Court House, the regiment proceeded to Washington, D.C. to participate in the Grand Review, remaining there until June 3, 1865, when it was mustered out of service and started for Detroit, arriving there on June 7, 1865, to be paid off and disbanded.

== Recognition and honors ==
Eight men from the regiment were awarded the Medal of Honor:

- Private Frederick Alber, Company A, Battle of Spotsylvania Court House, May 12, 1864
- Private Joseph E. Brandle, Company C, Lenoire Station, Tennessee, November 16, 1863
- Corporal John A. Falconer, Company A, Fort Sanders, Knoxville, Tennessee, November 20, 1863
- Private Andrew J. Kelley, Company E, Knoxville, Tennessee, November 20, 1863
- Sergeant Daniel McFall, Company E, Battle of Spotsylvania Court House, May 12, 1864
- Corporal Irwin Shepard, Company E, Knoxville, Tennessee, November 20, 1863
- Lieutenant Colonel Frederick W. Swift, Lenoire Station, Tennessee, November 16, 1863
- Sergeant Charles A. Thompson, Company D, Battle of Spotsylvania Court House, May 12, 1864

== Execution of Lincoln assassination convicts ==
Captain Christian Rath of the 17th Michigan acted as the executioner at the hanging of four people convicted of involvement in the assassination of President Lincoln: George Atzerodt, David Herold, Lewis Powell, and Mary Surratt.

== Total strength and casualties ==
The regiment had an initial enlistment of 1,079 officers and enlisted men. The regiment suffered 7 officers and 128 enlisted men who were killed in action or mortally wounded and 154 enlisted men who died of disease, for a total of 289 fatalities, or just over one-quarter (25.8%) of its initial strength.

== Commanders ==
- Colonel William H. Withington
- Colonel Constant Luce
- Colonel Frederick W. Swift

== See also ==
- List of Michigan Civil War Units
- Michigan in the American Civil War
