= Andrew Kelly =

Andrew or Andy Kelly may refer to:

- Andrew Kelly (Australian politician) (1854–1913), New South Wales politician
- Andy Kelly (hurler) (1898–?), Irish hurler
- Andy Kelly (rugby league) (born 1960), English rugby league footballer
- Andy Kelly (American football) (born 1968), American football quarterback
- Andrew Kelly (rugby union, born 1981), Scottish rugby union player for Glasgow Warriors
- Andrew Kelly (rugby union, born 1982), Scottish rugby union player for Edinburgh Rugby
- Andrew Kelly (footballer) (born 1984), English footballer
- Andrew Kelly (bowls) (born 1989), New Zealand lawn and Indoor bowler
- Andrew Kelly (Redwater), fictional character
- Andrew Kelly (sprinter), winner of the 300 yards at the 1917 USA Indoor Track and Field Championships

== See also ==
- Andrew J. Kelley, American Civil War soldier and Medal of Honor recipient
- Andrew Kelley, designer of the programming language Zig
