= Joseph E. Brandle =

- Born: October 8, 1839; Seneca County, Ohio
- Died: May 13, 1909 (aged 69)
- Burial place: Coldwater, Michigan
- Military career
- Allegiance: United States of America
- Branch: United States Army; Union Army
- Rank: Private
- Unit: 17th Regiment Michigan Volunteer Infantry
- Awards: Medal of Honor

Joseph E. Brandle (October 8, 1839 – May 13, 1909) was an American soldier who received the Medal of Honor for valor during the American Civil War.

== Biography ==
Brandle served in the American Civil War in the 17th Regiment Michigan Volunteer Infantry for the Union Army. He received the Medal of Honor on July 20, 1897, for his actions at Lenoir City, Tennessee.

== Medal of Honor citation ==
Citation:

While color bearer of his regiment, having been twice wounded and the sight of one eye destroyed, still held to the colors until ordered to the rear by his regimental commander.

== See also ==
- List of American Civil War Medal of Honor recipients: A-F
