= Frederick W. Swift =

Colonel in US in 1897

Frederick William Swift
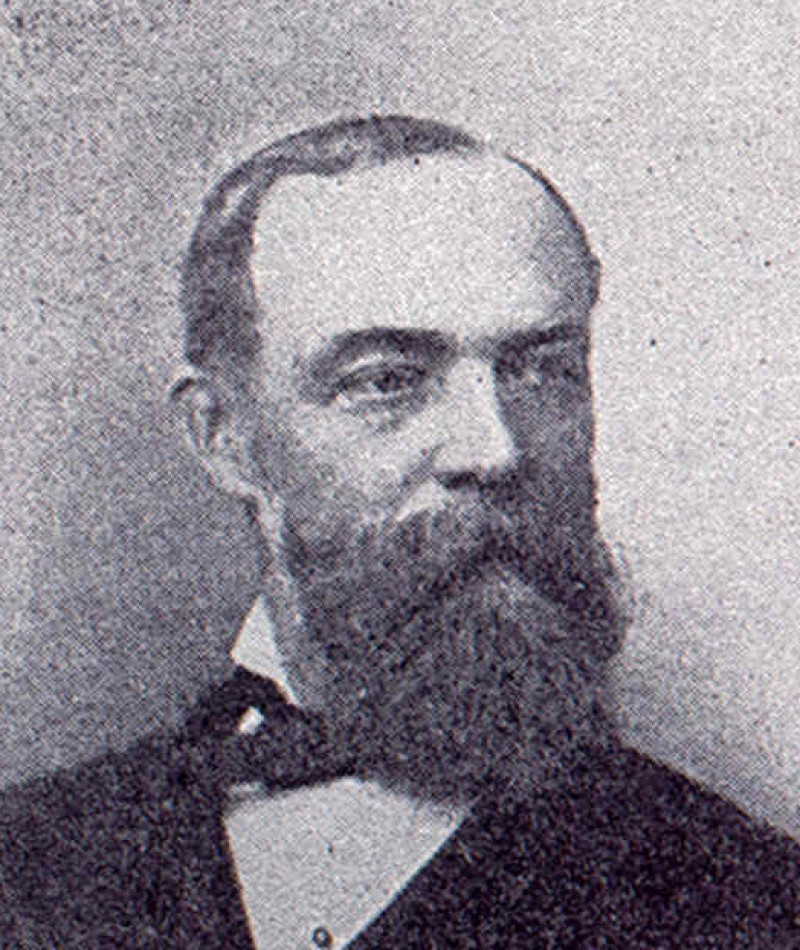
- Born: January 30, 1831; Mansfield, Connecticut, US
- Died: January 30, 1916 (aged 85); Detroit, Michigan, US
- Burial place: Elmwood Cemetery, Detroit
- Military career
- Allegiance: United States: Union
- Branch: Union Army
- Service years: 1862–1865
- Rank: Colonel; Brevet Brigadier General
- Commands: 17th Michigan Infantry Regiment
- Conflicts: American Civil War: Battle of Antietam; Battle of Fredericksburg; Siege of Vicksburg; Battle of Lenoir's Station
- Awards: Medal of Honor

Frederick William Swift (January 30, 1831 – January 30, 1916) was a Colonel of the United States Army who was awarded the Medal of Honor for gallantry in the American Civil War. He was awarded the medal on February 15, 1897, for actions performed at the Battle of Lenoir's Station in Tennessee in November 1863.

== Personal life ==
Swift was born on January 30, 1831, in Mansfield, Connecticut. He married twice, first to Mary Amelia Bradford in 1855 and then to Ella Berdan and fathered three total children. After the war, he served as postmaster of Detroit. He died on January 30, 1916, in Detroit and was buried in Elmwood Cemetery.

== Military service ==
Swift enlisted in the Army as a captain on July 29, 1862, in Detroit and was assigned to Company F of the 17th Michigan Infantry Regiment on August 26, 1862. On November 16, 1863, while acting as the rearguard of the Union force under General Ambrose Burnside in their retreat towards Knoxville, the 17th was attacked by the advance units of Confederate general James Longstreet's force. Demoralised and facing a charge from Confederate troops, the 17th's line was about to break. Swift, however, was able to take command by grabbing the unit colors and inspiring the men to form up on him. With a volley of musket fire, Swift was able to repulse the Confederate advance. For this action, Swift was awarded the Medal of Honor.

Swift's Medal of Honor citation reads:

The President of the United States of America, in the name of Congress, takes pleasure in presenting the Medal of Honor to Lieutenant Colonel Frederic William Swift, United States Army, for extraordinary heroism on 16 November 1863, while serving with 17th Michigan Infantry, in action at Lenoire Station, Tennessee. Lieutenant Colonel Swift gallantly seized the colors and rallied the regiment after three Color Bearers had been shot and the regiment, having become demoralized, was in imminent danger of capture.

— R. A. Alger, Secretary of War

Swift was promoted to lieutenant colonel on November 26, 1863, and assumed command of the 17th that same day. He was captured by the Confederates on May 12, 1864, at the Battle of Spotsylvania Court House in Virginia and was held in Macon, Georgia, until he was exchanged for Confederate prisoners of war on August 3, 1864, in Charleston, South Carolina. He was added to General Orlando B. Willcox's staff in October 1864. He was promoted to colonel in December 1864 and after the war received a brevet promotion to brigadier general, backdated to March 13, 1865. He was mustered out of the army on June 3, 1865, at Delaney House, Washington, D.C.

== See also ==
- List of American Civil War brevet generals (Union)
