= William H. Bell (servant) =

African-American servant of William Seward

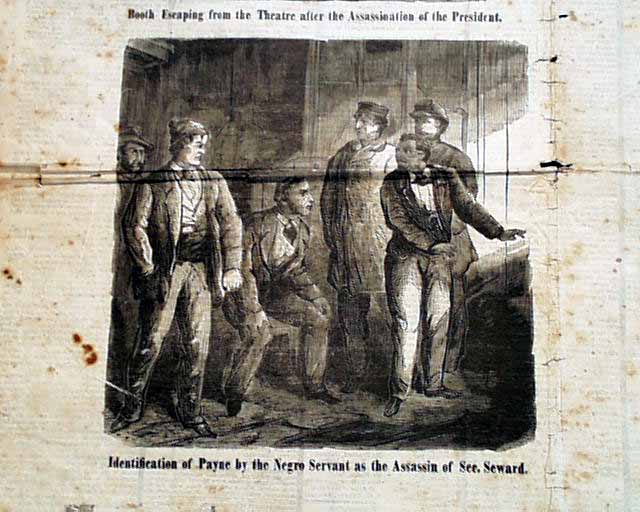
Pictured above is the newspaper story from the April 29, 1865, National Police Gazette of Bell picking Lewis Powell (also known as Lewis Payne) out of a police line up at General Augur's headquarters shortly after Powell was apprehended.

William H. Bell was an African American servant of William Seward, who is best known for being the doorman who greeted William Seward's would-be assassin Lewis Powell the night of April 14, 1865, and for giving testimony against him during the Abraham Lincoln military tribunal. William H. Bell was born around 1845, probably enslaved, and had ~4-5 years of schooling. Bell worked as a waiter at the time of the assault. He later went on to practice law.

== Early life ==
William H. Bell was an African American man likely born a slave around 1845. He did not know his actual age. He estimated himself to be 19–21 years old at the time of the military tribunal that followed the Lincoln assassination. At the trial he was noted to be racially a mulatto. At sometime in his early life, he received four or five years of education.

If born a slave, it is unknown how he received his freedom; however, it is known that he was not freed by the Washington D.C. Emancipation Act as no Emancipation Petition was filed. As he grew older, he eventually became a servant in William Seward's Washington home and served for only nine months prior to the attack.

== Night of April 14, 1865 ==
At about 10:10 P.M., on the night of April 14, 1865, the same night that John Wilkes Booth entered Ford's Theater, William H. Bell answered the door to Lewis Powell, who told Bell that he needed to bring Seward some medicine from Dr. Tullio Verdi, (Seward's doctor) to help him recover from a previous carriage accident. After a long conversation, Powell insisted that only he could bring the medicine to Seward and would not tell Bell why. Bell refused admission, so Powell pushed past Bell and tried to go directly to Seward's room upstairs. However, Bell then ran ahead of Powell as they climbed the stairs to Seward's bedroom. He asked Powell to walk more quietly up the stairs in his boots.

Upon hearing the commotion on the steps, Seward's son Frederick came out of his room to see what the commotion was all about. Frederick asked Powell to leave. When his sister Fanny shows up, Bell witnessed Powell attack Frederick Seward with a gun. Powell originally tried to shoot Frederick but his gun misfired, and he decided to hit Frederick repeatedly in the back of the head with the pistol, causing Fred's skull to split. Frederick received life-threatening injuries which he later recovered from, but he was never the same.

After Powell attacked Frederick Seward, Bell ran next door to General Augur's headquarters to get help. As he ran down the street he shouted, "Murder, murder, murder!" After reaching General Augur's headquarters, hoping to get the soldiers' attention, Bell ran back to the Seward house in time to witness Powell exiting the house. Bell watched Powell slowly ride off on a horse. Bell chased after Powell all the way to I Street and Fifteen but could not catch up to him.

In the moments that Bell was getting help, Powell ran into William Seward's bedroom and stabbed and slashed Seward repeatedly in the neck and facial region. Powell also stabbed George F. Robinson, a guard on duty in Seward's room, the other son, Augustus and a clerk from the State Department. Even though William Seward was repeatedly stabbed in the neck, a neck brace he was wearing from a previous injury protected him from a lethal wound. Thinking he had inflicted a mortal wound, Powell exited the house yelling "I am mad! I am mad!"

== Identifying Lewis Powell ==
After the events of the night of April 14, 1865, at about 2:30 in the morning, Bell was questioned about the assassination attempt inside the Seward home. He had not slept since the attack. Bell played a large role in identifying Powell to be tried. He was called to the police station to look at suspects and identified Powell out of the line-up. He noticed his hair, boots and pantaloons. This recognition was one of the main reasons Powell went to trial and was convicted. In one account afterwards, Bell said "As soon as I saw him, I put my finger right on his face and said, 'I know him; that was the man.'" Detective Sampson who was leading the investigation said afterwards "I had never seen a more positive identification in my life."

== Military tribunal testimony ==
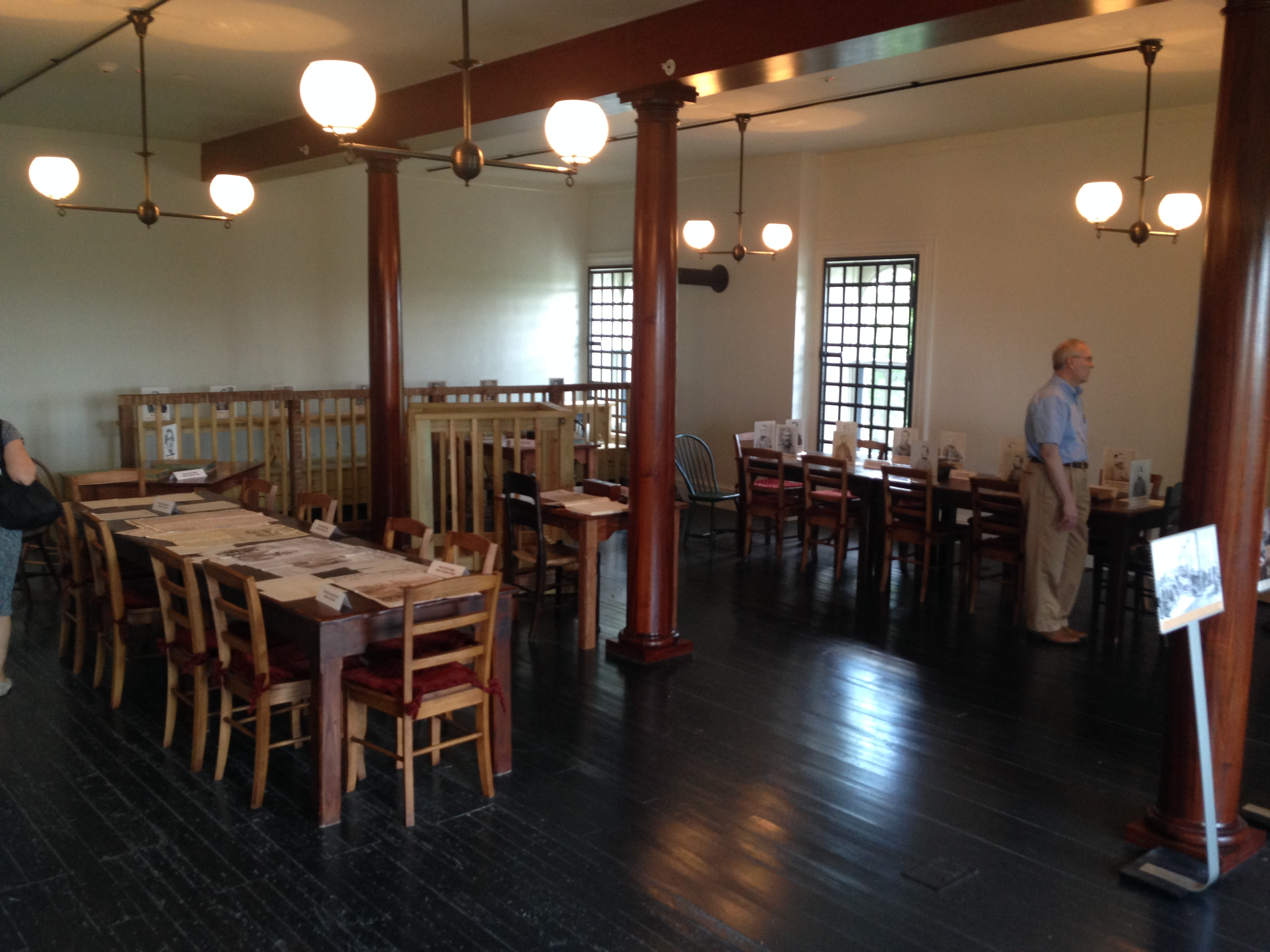
Above is the military tribunal room which has been re-staged to look as it did during the 1865 Abraham Lincoln Military Tribunal Conspiracy Trial. The stand where Bell would have testified can be seen in the center of the picture.

During the trial, Bell was a key witness against Lewis Powell. It was rare for an African American to testify against a white man during this time period. Bell was asked many questions about how he recognized Lewis Powell. He told the military judges that he could tell which of the accused men was Seward's assassin because the assassin was wearing the same boots and pants (pantaloons). Bell specifically remembered the assassin's boots because of how heavily the assassin walked up the stairs the night of the attack.

Another way Bell recognized him was by his coarse black hair and the way he spoke. Bell noticed that when Powell spoke, he raised his lip and also had a little wrinkle on his jaw. It appeared as if his teeth were very tight on his lips. Finally, Bell claimed to recognize Powell by his figure. Bell stated Powell was a muscular man with a tall, broad frame. Bell said during his testimony to ask Powell, (if he had not already confessed) if it was not Bell who opened the door to him.

There were some contradictions in Bell's testimony. Bell testified that Powell had a slight dimple when he talked and claimed to have recognized Powell's voice and tone in the earlier police line-up. However, it was pointed out that Powell never spoke during the actual police line-up. At the beginning of his testimony, Bell also referred to Powell as short, which would contradict his earlier statements that Powell was tall. This contradiction may have been because Powell was seated at the moment of the reference. Bell's testimony is the main source for most depictions of the attack on Seward.

== Modern portrayal ==
Bell has been rarely recognized for his actions during the attack. An example of this can be seen in later depictions of the act like the 2010 film The Conspirator. In this film, Bell's character simply lets Lewis Powell into the Seward home without a struggle. Furthermore, Bell's role in finding help, getting a make on Powell's horse, picking Powell out of the police line up, and courtroom testimony is not included.

In Philip Van Doren Stern's 1939 novel The Man Who Killed Lincoln, Powell said to Bell: "Get out of my way now, igger! I'm going up". This comment never happened. Nonetheless, this quote later appeared in books such as Jim Bishop's 1954's study The Day Lincoln got Shot and again in Bill O'Reilly and Martin Dugard's book Killing Lincoln.
