= Charles A. Thompson =

American Union soldier during Civil War

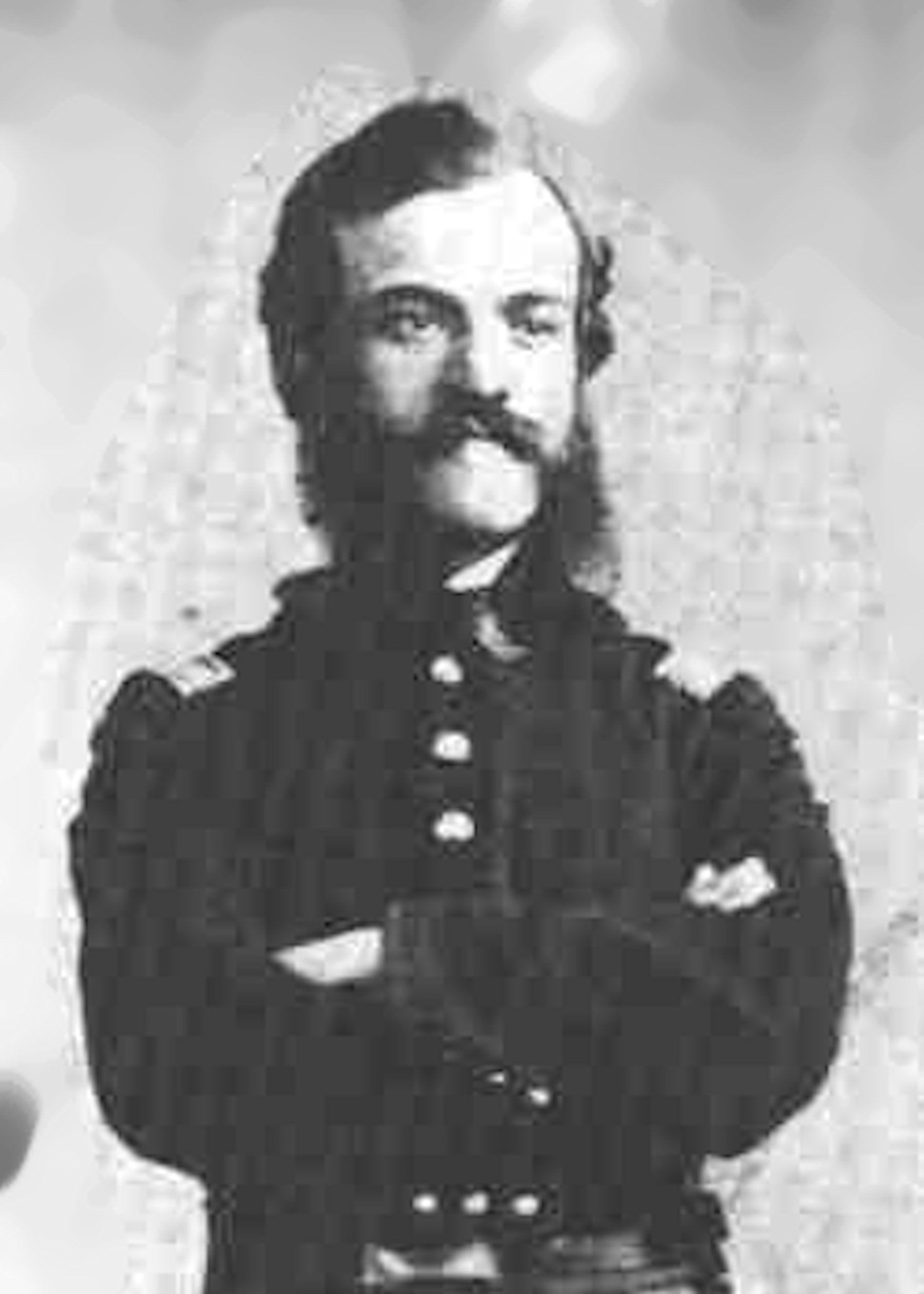

Charles A. Thompson (February 16, 1843 – August 24, 1900) was an American soldier who fought for the Union Army as an Officer in the American Civil War. He was awarded the Medal of Honor for his actions on 12 May, 1864 at The Battle of Spotsylvania. He served with Company D of the 17th Michigan Infantry. He is now buried at Evergreen Cemetery in Rutland, Vermont.

== Medal of Honor Citation ==
After the regiment was surrounded and all resistance seemed useless, fought single-handed for the colors and refused to give them up until he had appealed to his superior officers.

Date Issued: 27 July, 1897
