= Christian Rath =

German-American soldier and businessman

Christian Rath (October 22, 1831 – February 14, 1920) was a German-American soldier and businessman. Among his duties as an officer in the U.S. Army was to act as the executioner for several of the conspirators in the assassination of Abraham Lincoln.

== Early life ==
Rath was born to Johann Adam and Anna Marie (Schlee) Rath in Pfalzgrafenweiler, Landkreis Freudenstadt, Baden-Württemberg, in modern Germany. At the age of 18, he left home to participate in the revolutionary movement sweeping the region at that time.

At the age of 19, he emigrated to the United States. He served in the United States Navy for a brief time, and then settled in Jackson, Michigan.

== U.S. Army service ==
After the outbreak of the American Civil War, Rath enlisted in the 17th Michigan Volunteer Infantry Regiment.

=== Execution of Lincoln conspirators ===
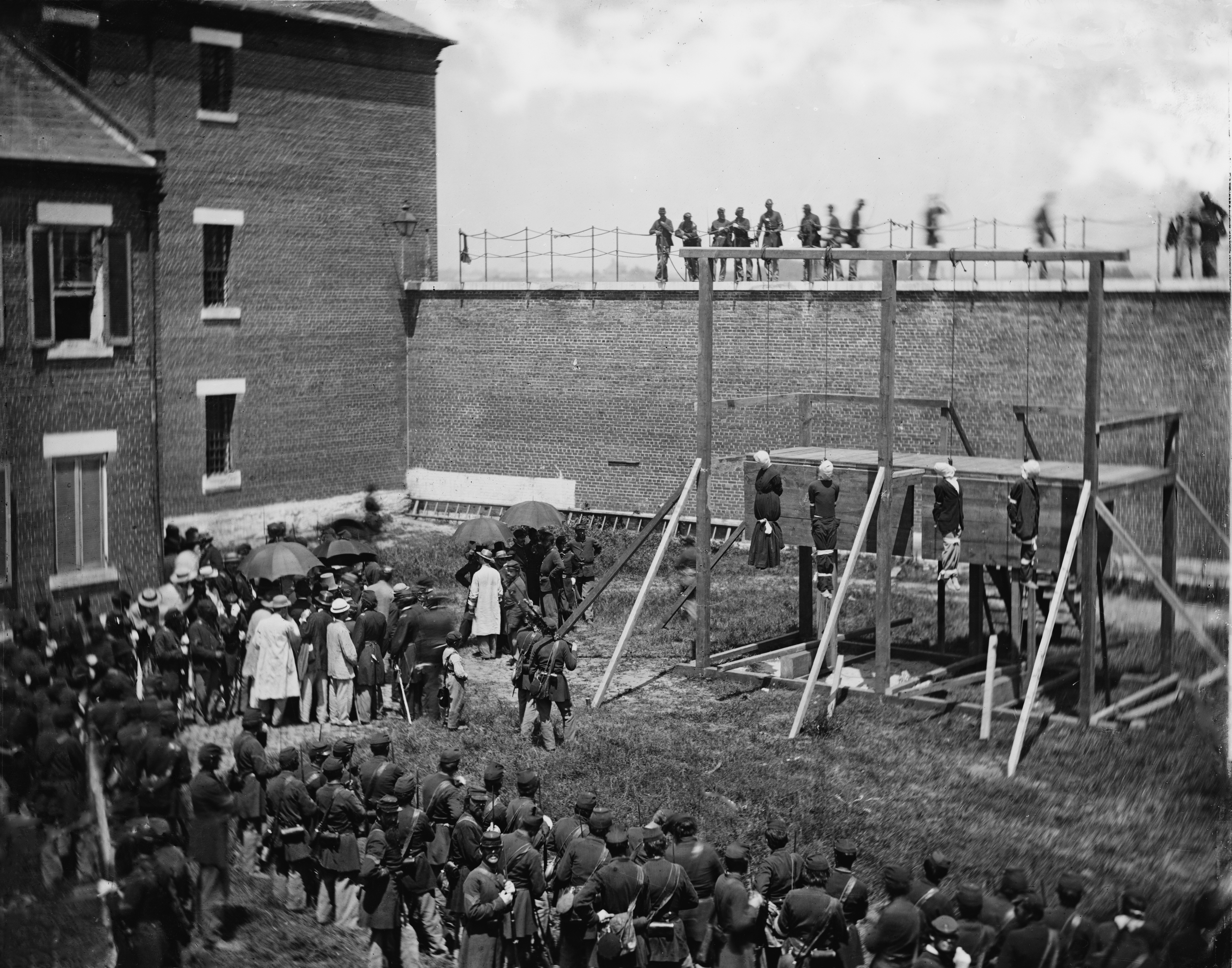
Execution of (left to right) Surratt, Powell, Herold, and Atzerodt on July 7, 1865, at the Washington Arsenal in Washington, D.C.

While detailed to the staff of Major General John F. Hartranft, Rath was assigned various duties related to the executions by hanging of Mary Surratt, Lewis Powell, David Herold, and George Atzerodt on July 7, 1865, due their guilty verdicts stemming from the assassination of Abraham Lincoln. These duties included making and hanging the nooses, giving the command for the prisoners to be hung, and arranging for their bodies to be put into coffins and buried.

== Later life ==
Rath's grave at Mount Evergreen Cemetery

Rath was discharged from the Union Army on July 19, 1865, twelve days after his participation in the execution, and returned to his home in Jackson, Michigan. He died there on February 14, 1920, and was buried at Mount Evergreen Cemetery.
