= Frederick Alber =

Union Army Medal of Honor recipient (1838–1913)

- Born: June 28, 1838; Germany
- Died: September 12, 1913 (aged 75); Columbiaville, Michigan, U.S.
- Burial place: Oregon Township Cemetery, Lapeer County, Michigan
- Military career
- Allegiance: United States of America; Union
- Branch: United States Army; Union Army
- Service years: 1862–1865
- Rank: Private
- Unit: 17th Michigan Infantry
- Conflicts: American Civil War: Battle of Spotsylvania Court House
- Awards: Medal of Honor

Frederick Alber (June 28, 1838 – September 12, 1913) was a United States soldier who fought for the Union Army as a member of Company A, 17th Michigan Infantry during the American Civil War. He was awarded his nation's highest military honor, the U.S. Medal of Honor, on July 30, 1896, for valor during the Battle of Spotsylvania Court House in 1864.

== Formative years ==
Born in Germany on June 28, 1838, Frederick Alber emigrated to the United States in 1846, and settled in Michigan, where he became a farmer.

== Civil War ==
At the age of 24, Alber enrolled for a three-year term of Civil War military service at Manchester, Michigan on July 2, 1862. He then officially mustered in for duty as a private with Company A of the 17th Michigan Infantry on August 19.

Engaged with the 17th Michigan in the Battle of Spotsylvania Court House in 1864, he captured two enemy soldiers after freeing Lieutenant Charles Todd, one of the officers from his regiment who had been captured by Confederate troops. On February 21, 1865, he was recognized for his valor when Major General John G. Parks, commanding officer of the U.S. Ninth Army Corps, recommended him for the Medal of Honor.

On June 3, 1865, Alber honorably mustered out at Delaney House in Washington, D.C.

== Post-war life ==
Following his honorable discharge from the military, Alber returned to Michigan. Married to Mary S. Alber, he was widowed by her on December 8, 1896.

== Death and interment ==
Alber died in Oregon Township, Michigan at the age of 75 on September 12, 1913, and was buried at that township's cemetery in Lapeer County.

== Medal of Honor citation ==
Rank and organization: Private, Company A, 17th Michigan Infantry. Place and date: At Spotsylvania, Va., May 12, 1864. Entered service at: Manchester, Mich. Born: 1838, Germany. Date of issue: July 30, 1896.

Citation:

Bravely rescued Lt. Charles H. Todd of his regiment who had been captured by a party of Confederates by shooting down one, knocking over another with the butt of his musket, and taking them both prisoners.

In November 1999, U.S. Senator Spencer Abraham (R-MI) paid tribute to Alber. According to the November 10, 1999 edition of the Congressional Record – Senate, Abraham delivered the following addressed to his colleagues:

Mr. President, I rise today to pay tribute to the late Frederick Alber of Lapeer County, MI. On November 13, 1999, the community of Oregon Township will dedicate a new headstone for Mr. Alber and also honor other veterans buried in the Oregon Township Cemetery. Frederick Alber enlisted in the Seventeenth Michigan Infantry on July 2, 1862 at age 24 and served valiantly during the Civil War. On July 30, 1896, Private Alber was issued the Medal of Honor for his undaunted bravery in the wilderness and his heroic actions at Spotsylvania. On May 12, 1864, Private Alber rescued Lieutenant Charles Todd of the 17th Michigan Infantry who was in the hands of a party of rebels. Private Alber shot down one enemy rebel and knocked over another with the butt of his musket. He then took the rebels as prisoners and conducted them both to the rear of the formation.

== See also ==
- List of Medal of Honor recipients
- List of American Civil War Medal of Honor recipients: A–F
