= Andrew J. Kelley =

American soldier (1845–1918)

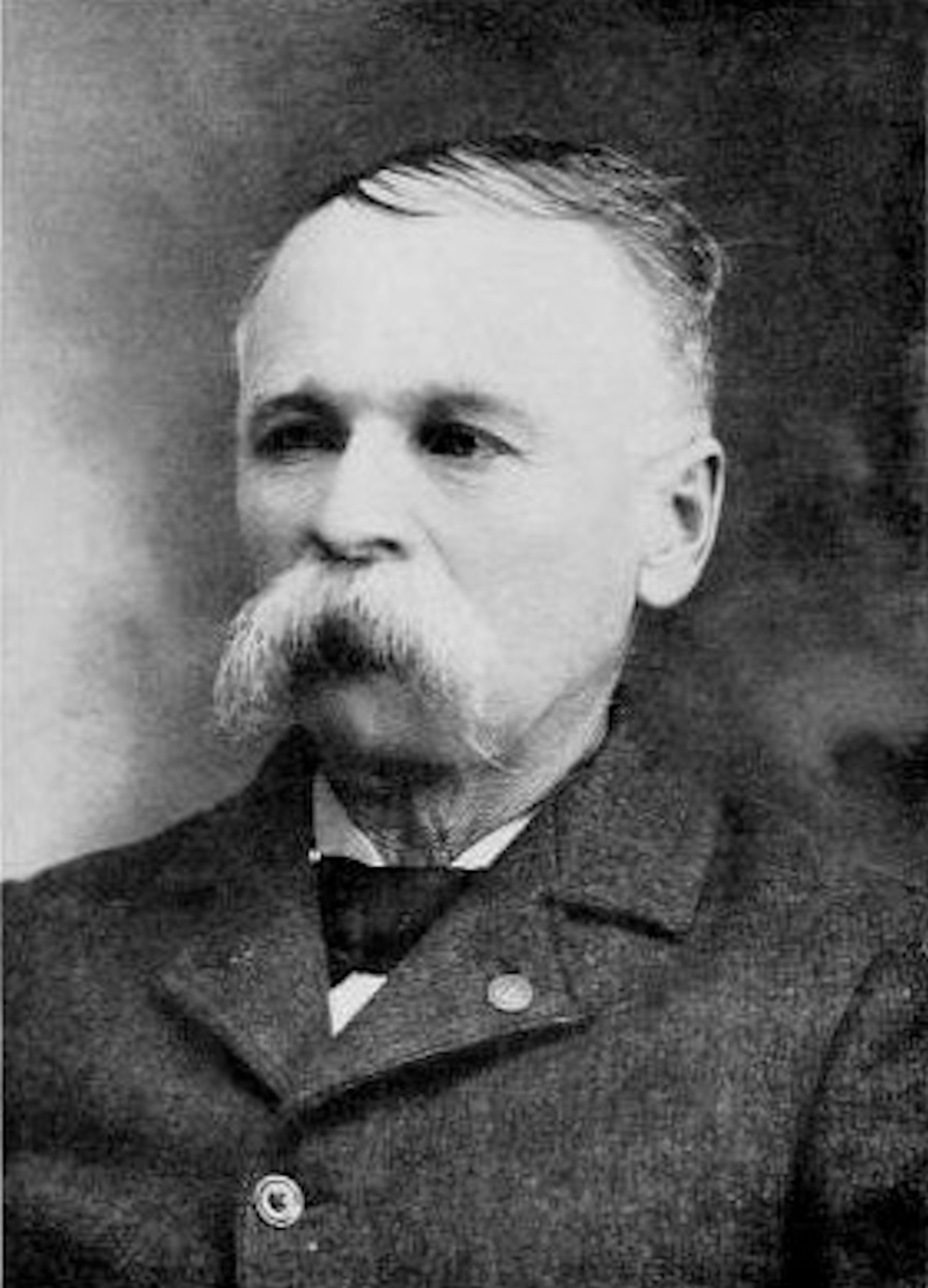
Andrew J. Kelley, c. 1895

Andrew John Kelley (September 2, 1845 - June 4, 1918) was an American recipient of the Medal of Honor and soldier in the American Civil War.

== Biography ==
Kelley was born in LaGrange County, Indiana on September 2, 1845. He enlisted as a private in Company E of the 17th Michigan Volunteer Infantry Regiment on August 12, 1862. He earned his medal in action during the Siege of Fort Sanders, Knoxville, Tennessee on November 20, 1863. He reached the rank of sergeant on May 1, 1865. He was mustered out a year later on June 3, 1865. He died in Crookston, Minnesota on June 4, 1918, and is now interred in Oakdale Cemetery, Crookston, Minnesota.

== Medal of Honor citation ==
For extraordinary heroism on 20 November 1863, in action at Fort Sanders, Knoxville, Tennessee. Having voluntarily accompanied a small party to destroy buildings within the enemy's lines whence sharpshooters had been firing, disregarded an order to retire, remained and completed the firing of the buildings, thus insuring their total destruction; this at the imminent risk of his life from the fire of the advancing enemy.
