= Lewis Powell (conspirator) =

American soldier and conspirator (1844–1865)

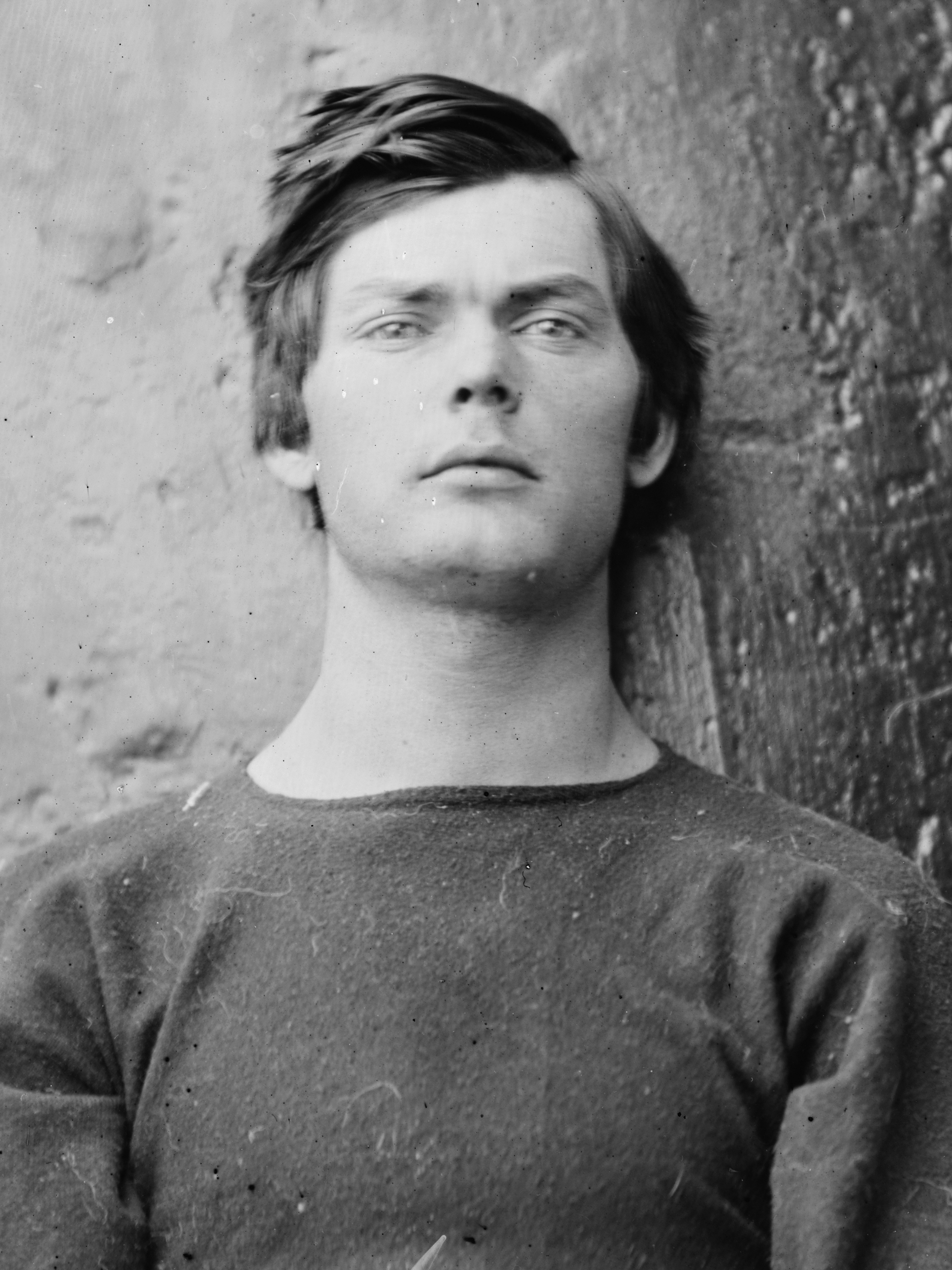
- Powell aboard USS Saugus, 1865. Photograph by Alexander Gardner
- Born: Lewis Thornton Powell; April 22, 1844; Randolph, Alabama, U.S.
- Died: July 7, 1865 (aged 21); Arsenal Penitentiary, Fort McNair, Washington, D.C., U.S.
- Cause of death: Execution by hanging
- Resting place: Geneva Cemetery, Florida
- Other names: Lewis Paine; Lewis Payne
- Known for: Lincoln assassination plot
- Conviction: Conspiracy to assassinate Abraham Lincoln
- Penalty: Death
- Accomplices: John Wilkes Booth; George Andrew Atzerodt; David Edgar Herold; John Harrison Surratt Jr.; Mary Elizabeth Surratt

Details
- Date: April 14, 1865, 10:15 p.m.
- Locations: Washington, D.C.
- Target: William Henry Seward
- Injured: 5
- Military career
- Branch: Confederate Army
- Years of service: 1861–1865
- Units: 2nd Florida Infantry; Mosby's Rangers
- Campaigns: Peninsula campaign; Gettysburg campaign

Lewis Thornton Powell (April 22, 1844 – July 7, 1865) was an American Confederate soldier who attempted to assassinate William Henry Seward as part of the Lincoln assassination plot. Wounded at the Battle of Gettysburg, he later served in Mosby's Rangers before working with the Confederate Secret Service in Maryland. John Wilkes Booth recruited him into a plot to kidnap Lincoln and turn the president over to the Confederacy, but then decided to assassinate Lincoln, Seward, and Vice President Andrew Johnson instead, and assigned Powell the task to kill Seward.

Co-conspirator David Herold was to guide Powell to Seward's home, then help him escape, but fled before Powell was able to exit the Seward home. Powell arrived at the boarding house run by Mary Surratt, mother of co-conspirator John Surratt, three days later while the police were there conducting a search, and was arrested. Powell, Mary Surratt, Herold, and George Atzerodt were sentenced to death by a military tribunal, and executed at the Washington Arsenal.

== Early life ==
Lewis Powell was born in Randolph County, Alabama, on April 22, 1844, to George Cader and Patience Caroline Powell. He was the youngest son in a family of eight children. Powell's father was ordained a Baptist minister in 1847, and in 1848, the family moved to Stewart County, Georgia, where his father had received an appointment as pastor of Beulah Church in the village of Green Hill. About this time, Powell's father freed the three slaves he owned. Powell and his siblings were all educated by their father, who was the local schoolmaster.

In his early years, Powell was described as quiet and introverted, and well liked by others. He enjoyed carving, fishing, singing, reading, and studying. He also loved attending church, Sunday school, and prayer meetings. He often nursed and cared for sick and stray animals, earning the nickname "Doc" from his sisters. Powell could also be immensely stubborn, and the entire family was well known for their hot tempers.

When Powell was 13, his jaw was broken by a mule kick, leaving the left side of his jaw more prominent. In 1859 the Powells were forced to sell their farm and they moved to the village of Bellville in Hamilton County, Florida. The following year, George Powell established a church in Apopka, a town on the border between Orange and Seminole County, and the family moved to a farm outside Live Oak Station in Suwannee County.

== Military service ==
=== 2nd Florida Infantry and capture ===
In June 1861, Lewis Powell left home and traveled to Jasper, Florida, where he enlisted in Company I of the 2nd Florida Infantry. He was accepted because he lied about his age – he claimed to be 19. Powell's unit fought in March and April 1862, in the Peninsula Campaign. Powell became a battle-hardened and effective soldier. He won praise from his commanding officers and claimed that when he shot his rifle he did so to kill – never to wound. He was alleged to have carried the skull of a Union soldier with him, which he used as an ashtray. His one-year enlistment having expired, Powell received a two-month furlough, during which time he returned home to visit his family. He re-enlisted at Jasper on May 8, 1862. In November 1862, Powell fell ill and was hospitalized at General Hospital No. 11 in Richmond, Virginia. He returned to active duty within a few weeks and fought in the Battle of Fredericksburg. His unit was then assigned to Third Corps, Army of Northern Virginia, which was organized at the beginning of 1863. Third Corps finally went into combat at the Battle of Gettysburg.

Powell was shot in the right wrist on July 2. He was captured, and sent to a prisoner of war hospital at Pennsylvania College. Transferred to Camp Letterman, the vast medical field hospital northeast of Gettysburg, on July 6, Powell worked as a nurse in the camp and at Pennsylvania College until September 1, when he was turned over to the Provost Marshal. He was taken by train to Baltimore, Maryland, and—still a POW—began working on September 2, at West Buildings Hospital. In Baltimore, Powell met and developed a relationship with a woman named Margaret "Maggie" Branson, who was volunteering as a nurse. It is believed that Branson assisted Powell in escaping from the hospital on September 7. Some historians contend that she actually provided him with a Union Army uniform.

=== Escape and Mosby's Rangers ===
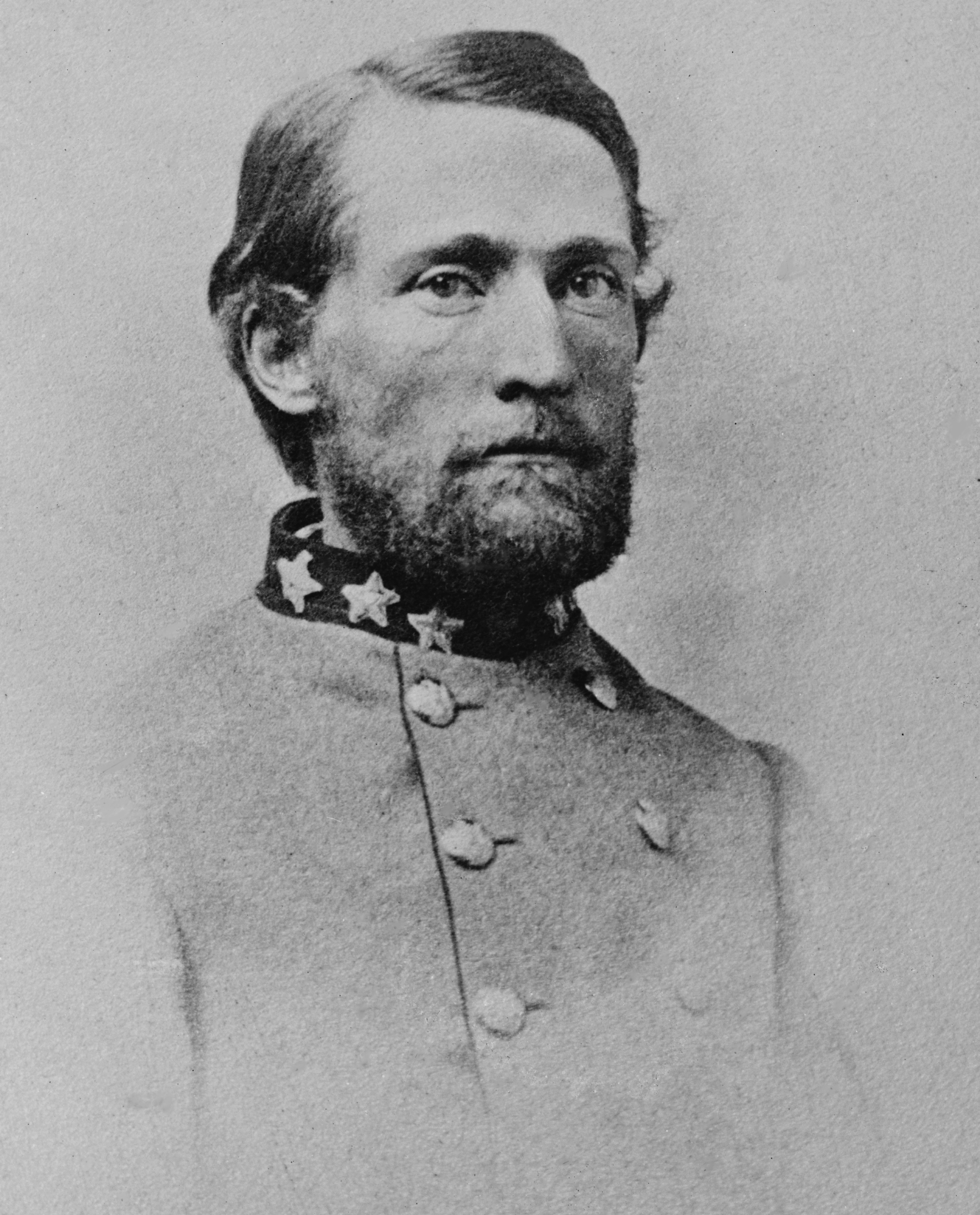
Colonel John S. Mosby

Branson took Powell to her mother's boarding house at 16 North Eutaw Street in Baltimore. Maryland was split during the Civil War. West of the Atlantic Fall Line, the central and western parts of the state, largely settled by Germans from Pennsylvania and other Northerners during the 18th century, tended to support the Union, as evidenced by Governor Thomas Holliday Hicks's plan to stop secession by moving the Maryland General Assembly to Frederick, where on April 29, 1861, secession had been voted down 53–13, this taking place before Maryland was placed under martial law. East of the Fall line, the city of Baltimore and all of the land between the Mason–Dixon Line and the Potomac and the Eastern Shore for the most part was peopled by Confederate sympathizers, who either directly or indirectly aided the Confederacy. The few exceptions to this rule included Hicks's successor, Augustus Bradford, who had his home in North Baltimore burned to the ground in 1864 by Frederick native Confederate General Bradley T Johnson and his Maryland troops. Johnson was the first to concoct the idea of kidnapping President Lincoln while he was visiting the soldiers home, but whether there were any direct connections to Booth and Powell is unknown.

The Branson boarding house was a well-known Confederate safe house and frequent rendezvous point for members of the Confederate Secret Service – the Confederacy's spy agency. Powell may have spent up to two weeks at the Branson house before heading south. While still in Maryland, he learned the location of Harry Gilmor and his "Gilmor's Raiders"—a unit of Confederate cavalry detached from Second Corps—and spent a few days with them. He crossed into Virginia and on September 30, he ended up at the home of John Scott Payne, a prominent doctor and Confederate sympathizer who lived at Granville Tract, a plantation about 4 miles (6 km) from Warrenton. By now, Powell was wearing a ragged Confederate uniform, and Payne welcomed him into the home for a meal and a night's stay. They discussed the exploits of Colonel John S. Mosby's Mosby's Rangers, a large detached unit of partisans based in Warrenton. Powell joined Mosby the following day.

For more than a year, Powell served under Mosby. Mosby considered Powell to be one of his most effective soldiers, and Powell earned the nickname "Lewis the Terrible" for his ferocity and murderousness in combat. He lived as a civilian with the Paynes, putting on his uniform and participating in military activities only when conducting a partisan raid. Powell participated in a number of actions, including the Wagon Raids of October and November 1863; the Battle of Loudoun Heights on January 10, 1864; the battle of Second Dranesville on February 20–21; the action at Mount Zion Church on July 3 and 6; the Berryville Wagon Raid on August 13; the Raid on Merritt's Cavalry Division in September; the Manassas Gap Railroad Raid on October 3–7; the Greenback Raid on October 14; the Valley Pike Raid on October 25; and the Rout of Blazer's Command on November 17. This last raid proved to be a turning point for Powell. Union Army Lieutenant Richard R. Blazer was a noted Native American fighter who had been sent to destroy Mosby's Rangers. Instead, Blazer's unit was routed and Blazer captured. Powell and three others were given the privilege of taking Blazer to prison in Richmond, Virginia, in late November.

Powell's visit to Richmond changed him. He returned to Warrenton morose and introspective. Historian Michael W. Kauffman argues that Powell saw a Baltimore acquaintance in Richmond, and that turned his thoughts back to the time he had spent in September 1863, romancing Margaret Branson and her sister, Mary, at the Branson boarding house. Powell biographer Betty Ownsbey, however, argues that his Richmond trip made him aware that the Confederate cause was lost, and his depression was caused by his desire to get out of the fighting. Several other historians claim that the Confederate Secret Service had already recruited him into its ranks during the previous year—with Mosby's consent—and that Powell's moodiness came from moral misgivings he had as he contemplated being sent north to assist with various kidnap plots against Abraham Lincoln. (Note: There is significant dispute as to whether Mosby was involved with the Confederate Secret Service. Historian Jeffry D. Wert noted that, in the absence of hard evidence, there is not enough circumstantial evidence to prove Mosby's involvement. C. Wyatt Evans goes even further, and has concluded there is absolutely no evidence whatsoever to link Mosby to Confederate spy organization.)

== Involvement in conspiracy ==
=== Recruitment ===
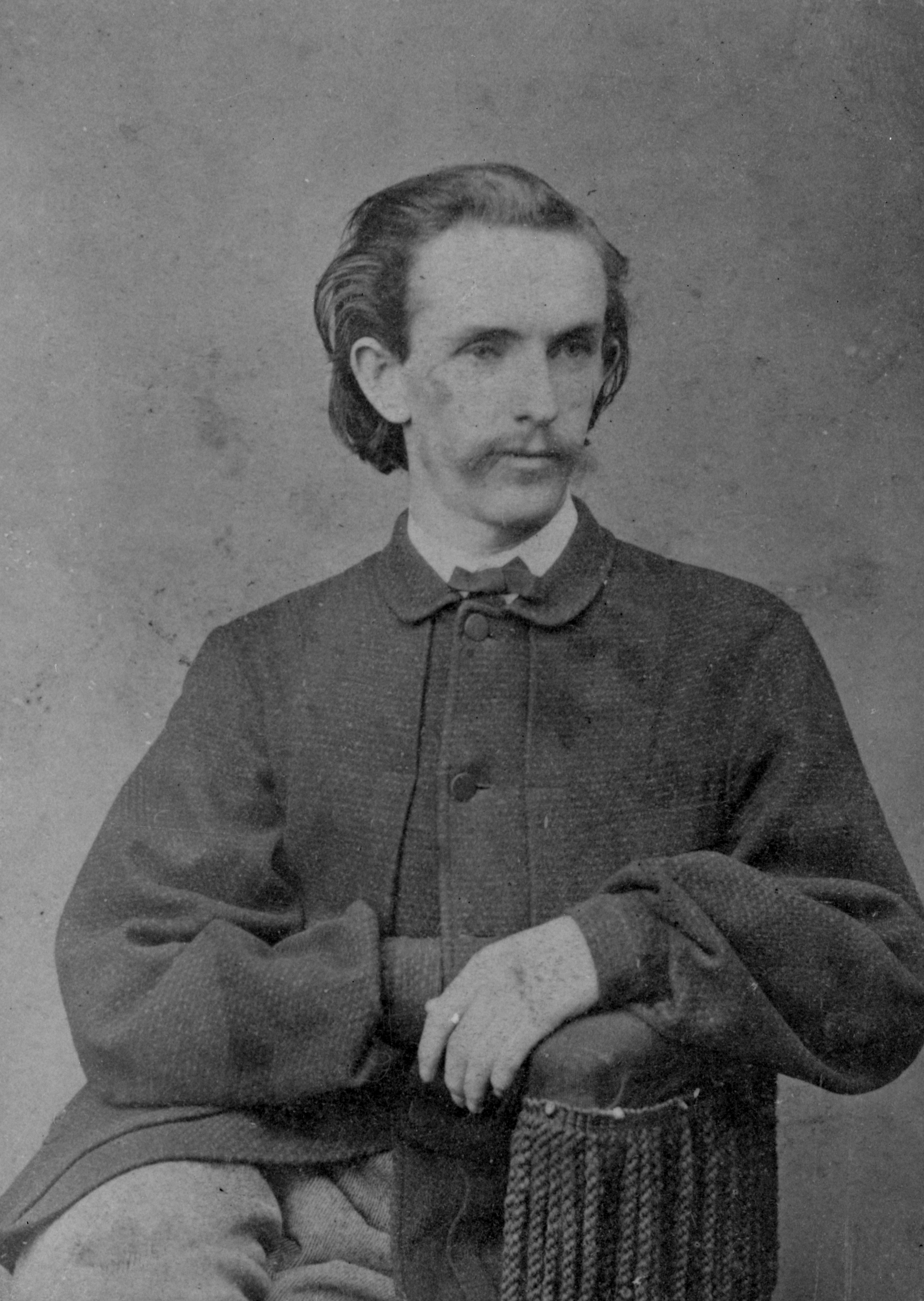
John Surratt in 1868

It is known that Powell deserted on January 1, 1865. He made his way to Richmond, where he sold his horse and purchased a ticket on a train headed for Alexandria. On January 13, he entered the Union Army's lines at Alexandria, claimed to be a civilian refugee, and—under the name "Lewis Payne"—took an oath of allegiance to the United States. (Note: Powell later claimed that he had to use an alias, because Mosby's men would kill him for deserting.) On January 14, Powell arrived in Baltimore and checked into Miller's Hotel. He made contact with the Bransons, and soon took up residence in their boarding house again. He used the name "Lewis Payne", and the Bransons introduced him to David Preston Parr, a merchant whose china shop was used for meetings, as a mail drop, and as a safe house for Confederate agents and spies. Over the next few weeks, Powell met frequently with Parr, a Confederate Secret Service agent.

The same day that Powell arrived in Baltimore, John Surratt and Louis J. Weichmann purchased a boat at Port Tobacco in Charles County, Maryland. Surratt, and to a much lesser degree Weichmann, were members of a group led by John Wilkes Booth which planned to kidnap President Abraham Lincoln and spirit him into Virginia, where he could be turned over to Confederate military authorities. The boat was needed to ferry Lincoln across the Potomac River. The two men then traveled to Baltimore on January 21. In testimony for the prosecution in June 1865, Weichmann said that Surratt had $300 (~$6,310 in 2025) which he needed to give to a man in Baltimore. Although Surratt never revealed the man's name, the prosecution at Powell's 1865 trial attempted to show that this man was Lewis Powell. Historian Edward Steers Jr. agrees that it is likely that Surratt met Powell at this time, while historians David Griffin Chandler and Elizabeth Trindal present their meeting at Parr's China Hall store as fact.

Either in late January or early February 1865, Powell encountered John Wilkes Booth outside Barnum's Hotel in Baltimore. Booth treated Powell to lunch at the hotel, and recruited him into the plot to kidnap Lincoln. Powell became a fervent believer in Booth, and Booth came to trust Powell implicitly. Although several others had been part of the conspiracy for some time, Powell swiftly became the second most important person in the plot – next to John Surratt. Booth made arrangements for Powell to stay at Herndon House boarding house under the name "Reverend Lewis Payne" whenever he traveled to Washington, D.C. During this time, Powell used a variety of aliases in addition to "Lewis Payne", including use of the last names Hall, Kensler, Mosby, Paine, and Wood.

=== Kidnap conspiracy at Surratt's boarding house ===
In early February, Powell, using the alias "Mr. Wood," appeared at Mary Surratt's boarding house in Washington. Mary was John's mother, and she had taken up residence in the boarding house in the fall of 1864 after renting out her tavern in Surrattsville, Maryland, to former District of Columbia police officer John M. Lloyd. Powell asked for John Surratt, who was not at home. He then requested something to eat and a place to stay, and Mary granted both requests after her son returned home and vouched for "Mr. Wood." Powell told Louis J. Weichmann, who was a boarder in the house, that "Wood" was a clerk in Parr's china shop in Baltimore. Powell left the next day.

Powell's role in the plot almost came to an end when, on March 12, 1865, he beat a black maid at the Branson boarding house. She had him arrested and accused him of being a Confederate spy. It was a serious charge: Maryland was under martial law, and the Union Army's Provost Marshal had supervision over such cases. Using the name "Lewis Paine," Powell swore he was from Fauquier County, Virginia, and knew nothing about the war. Declaring he was only 18 years old, he pretended to be stupid and not understand the English language too well. Lacking evidence that he was a spy, the Provost Marshal released Powell on March 14. Powell took an oath of allegiance to the United States, and the Provost Marshal wrote on his allegiance form that "Lewis Paine" was to live north of Philadelphia, Pennsylvania, for the duration of the war.

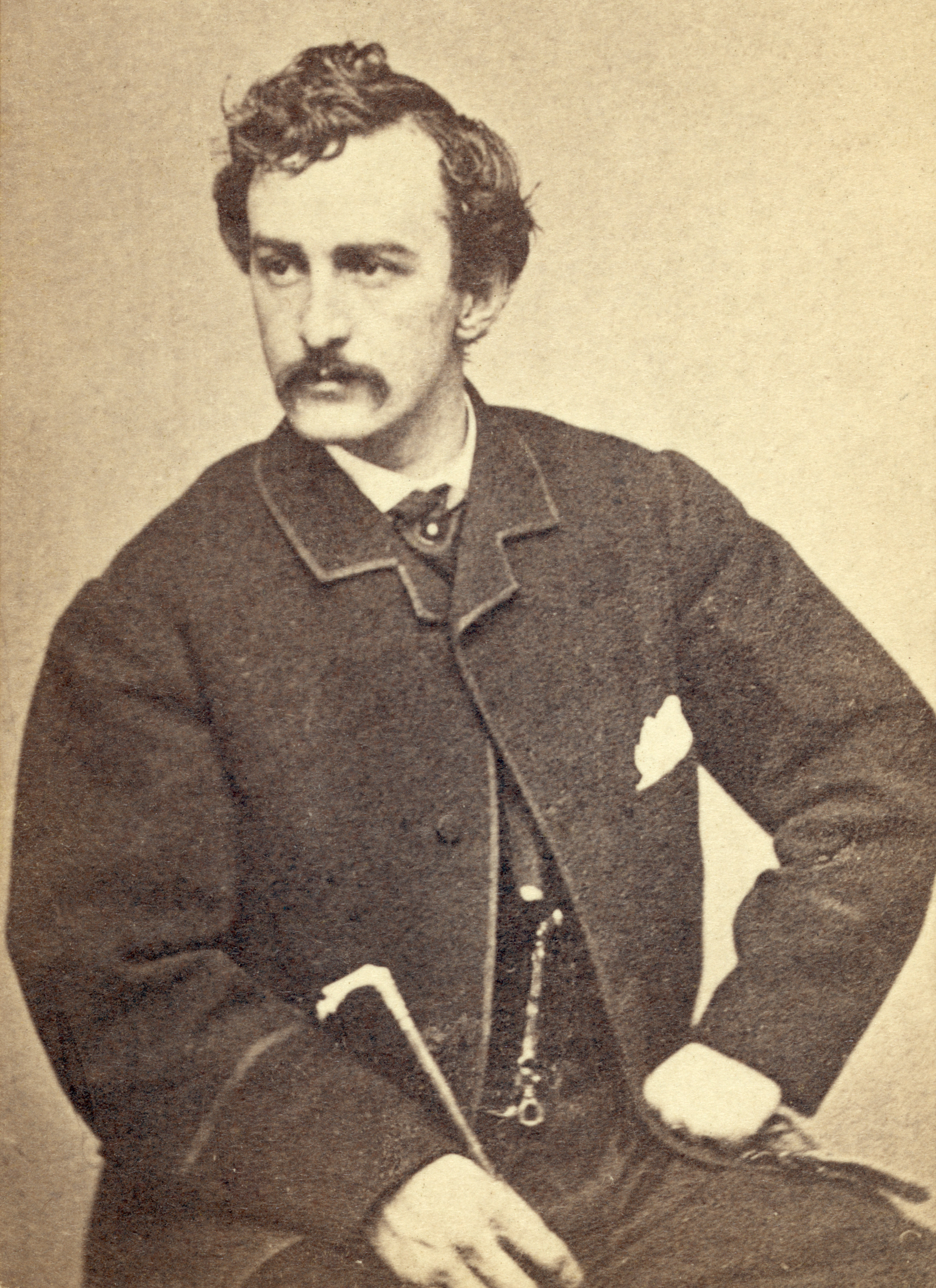
John Wilkes Booth in 1865

The day before Powell was released, John Surratt sent a telegram to Parr in Baltimore, telling him to send Powell immediately to Washington. Powell was freed just in time to take the 6:00 p.m. train to the capital. (Note: Steers claims that this telegram also told Parr to give $300 to Powell. But the text of the telegram printed in Kauffman and in Griffin shows no such order.) Powell arrived at the Surratt boarding house and identified himself as "Reverend Lewis Payne," a Baptist preacher. When members of the boarding house recognized him as Mr. Wood from several weeks earlier, Powell explained that he knew a Mr. Wood and that they had been confused. In a new suit, his demeanor suave and cultured—quite unlike his previous surly attitude—the members of the household accepted his explanation. But when "Reverend Payne" met with John Surratt, he claimed not to know him – even though on his previous visit he claimed to be a friend of John's. To Weichmann, this was highly suspicious behavior, but Mary said she was happy with "Reverend Payne's" explanations. Powell stayed for three days, then left.

Powell was not the only conspirator to have arrived in the city. Booth had assembled his entire team—which consisted of John Surratt, Lewis Powell, Samuel Arnold, George Atzerodt, David Herold, and Michael O'Laughlen—because he wanted the men to plan to kidnap Lincoln the next time he attended a play at Ford's Theatre. Booth rented the President's Box at the theater on March 15, and he provided tickets to Powell and Surratt so that they could familiarize themselves with the layout of the theater and how to gain access to the box. The two attended the theater as planned – in the company of two of Mary's female boarders.

The group then had a late-night planning meeting at Gautier's Restaurant at 252 Pennsylvania Avenue. It was the first time that Arnold and O'Laughlen met the others, and it was the first time Booth revealed his plan to kidnap Lincoln from Ford's Theatre. Booth assigned Powell—whom he called Mosby—the job of catching a handcuffed Lincoln as he was lowered from the president's box onto the stage. Arnold said that Powell, the strongest of the men, should be the one to subdue and handcuff Lincoln, not catch him from below. As the men argued, Booth kept altering his plan and Powell's role in it. Throughout the meeting, Arnold and O'Laughlen expressed their anger at Booth. They said they had joined a plot to kidnap Lincoln in the country, where the president would be unguarded and there was little chance of encountering a military patrol. Now Booth was changing that plan significantly, and they did not like it. The meeting broke up at 5:00 a.m. after Arnold said trying to kidnap Lincoln from a theater full of people in the middle of the city was suicidal.

On the morning of March 17, Booth learned that President Lincoln had been invited to attend a matinee theatrical performance at the Soldiers' Home. The Soldiers' Home was in a rural part of the District of Columbia about 1 mile (1.6 km) from the city limits (at that time Florida Avenue), and Lincoln usually visited the facility without an escort. The group met in front of the Surratt boarding house at 2:00 p.m., to receive instructions from Booth. Booth sent Herold out to the Surratt tavern with equipment, and informed the others that they should wait at a local saloon while he rode out to the Soldier's Home to scout the area. When Booth arrived at the Soldier's Home, he learned that Lincoln had decided to address a group of Indiana soldiers at a downtown hotel instead. Powell and the other conspirators never left the tavern.

Powell returned to the Branson boarding house that evening, then traveled to New York City with Booth on March 21. Powell stayed at the Revere House, a fashionable hotel, and later moved to a boarding house. (Note: Powell often told friends and acquaintances that he was going to New York City, when in fact he was headed some place else. This appears to be the first time Powell did not use New York as a "blind" for some other activity.) There is evidence that Booth and Powell then traveled to Toronto, Upper Canada, a major center of Confederate activity. Richard Montgomery, a Confederate spy, said that he saw Powell meet with Jacob Thompson and Clement Claiborne Clay, the two heads of the Confederate Secret Service, in Toronto. On March 23, Booth sent a coded telegram to Louis Weichmann, which John Surratt understood to mean that Powell should stay at the Herndon House after he returned to Washington. Powell returned to the capital on the night of March 27, and checked into the Herndon House using the alias "Kensler". Powell joined Booth that night to watch a performance of the opera La Forza del Destino at Ford's Theatre.

On April 11, President Lincoln addressed a crowd from the balcony on the north side of the White House. In this speech, Lincoln discussed his plans for accepting the rebellious states back into the Union, and singled out Louisiana as the first he would like to see do so. Lincoln announced that he also wanted to see African Americans given the right to vote. Booth and Powell stood on the White House lawn listening to the speech. Booth seethed at the idea of giving blacks political power, and told Powell, "That means nigger citizenship. Now, by God, I will put him through. That will be the last speech he will ever make."

== Lincoln assassination plot ==
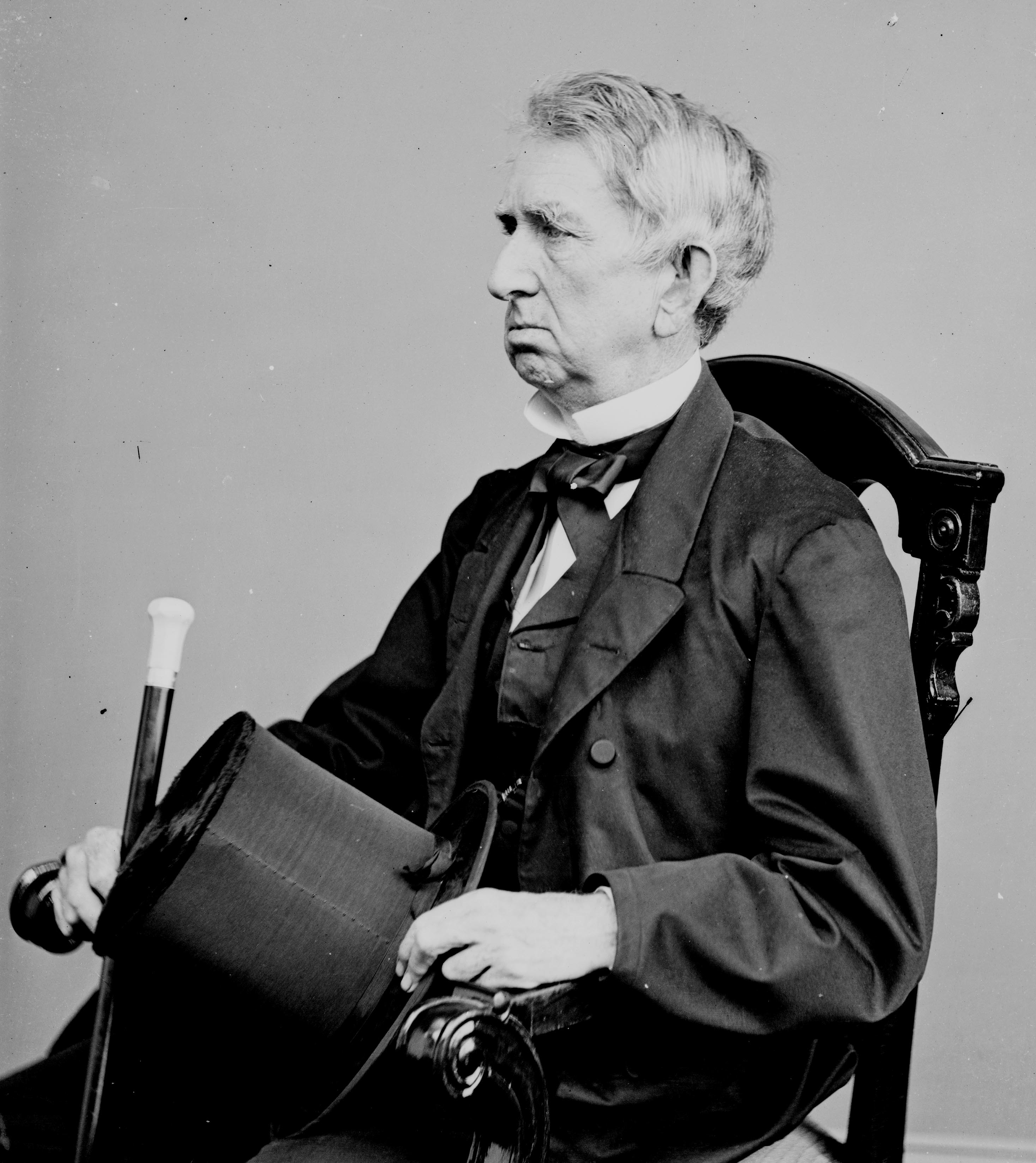
William H. Seward, the object of Powell's murder attempt

It is unclear just when Powell learned that the kidnap plot had turned to an assassination. There is testimony from the nurse attending the Secretary of State indicating that Powell may have learned of his role to assassinate Seward on Thursday, April 13. A man fitting Powell's description appeared at the Seward home that day to inquire about the Secretary's health. Powell himself was inconsistent. He once said he learned he was to kill Seward on the morning of Friday, April 14, but later claimed he did not know until the evening of April 14.

On the afternoon of April 14, Booth learned that Abraham Lincoln would be attending a play at Ford's Theatre that night. Booth decided that the time had come to kill Lincoln. Booth sent David Herold to tell Powell the news. Booth and Powell probably spent the afternoon and early evening at the Canterbury Music Hall on Pennsylvania Avenue, where Powell met and possibly had a tryst with Mary Gardner, a performer there.

At 8:45 p.m. that night, Booth, Atzerodt, Herold, and Powell met in Powell's room at the Herndon House in Washington, D.C., where Booth assigned roles. They would strike that very night, Booth said. Powell (accompanied by Herold) was to go to the home of Secretary of State William H. Seward and kill him. Atzerodt was to assassinate Vice President Andrew Johnson. (Note: Johnson was staying in the Kirkwood Hotel, and Atzerodt checked into a room at the hotel on the morning of April 14. Atzerodt failed in his task because he lost his nerve and got drunk.) Booth was to murder Lincoln at Ford's Theatre.

=== The attack on Seward ===
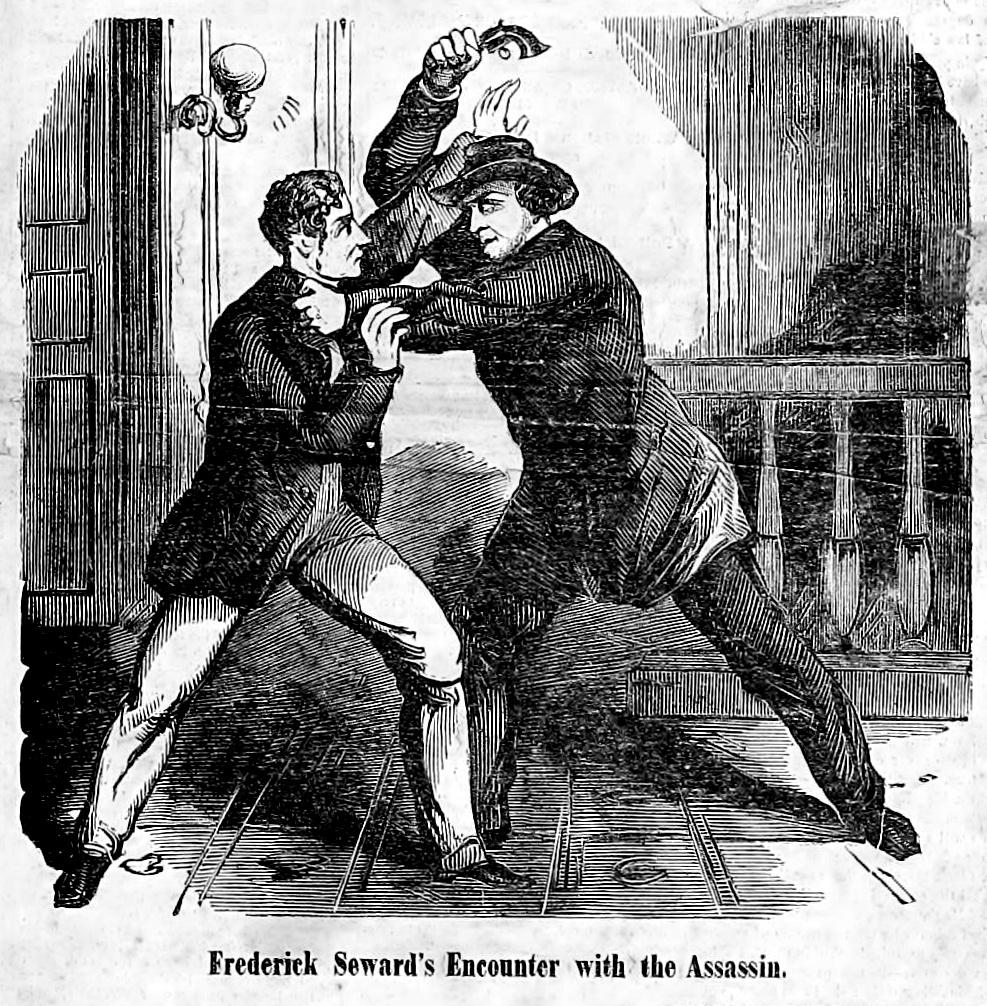
Powell attacking Frederick Seward after attempting to shoot him

At about 10:10 p.m., the same time Booth made his way to the unguarded presidential box at Ford's Theater, Powell was escorted to the Seward residence on Lafayette Square near the White House by David Herold. Seward had been injured in a carriage accident on April 5, and suffered a concussion, broken jaw, broken right arm, and many serious bruises. Local newspapers reported that Seward was at home convalescing, so Powell and Herold knew where to find him. Powell was armed with a Whitney revolver and large knife, and wore black pants, a long overcoat, a grey vest, a grey dress coat, and a hat with a wide brim. Herold waited outside, holding Powell's horse. Powell knocked and rang the bell, and the door was answered by William Bell, Seward's African American maître d’hôtel. Holding up a small bottle, Powell claimed that Seward's physician, T. S. Verdi, had sent some medicine to the house. Bell was suspicious, as Verdi had departed the home only an hour earlier and left instructions for Seward not to be disturbed. Bell asked Powell to wait, but Powell pushed past him and began mounting the stairs to the second-floor bedrooms.

Seward's son, Frederick W. Seward, appeared at the top of the steps. When Powell reached the second floor, he told Frederick that he was delivering medicine, but Frederick refused Powell's request. As Lewis Powell and Frederick bickered over the medicine story, Seward's daughter, Fanny Seward, stuck her head out of her father's bedroom door and warned the men that Seward was sleeping. She then returned to the bedroom. Once Fanny went into her father's bedroom, Frederick asked Powell to leave. Powell was about to take a few steps, but he pulled out his revolver and pulled the trigger with the barrel of the gun against Frederick's head. The revolver misfired, and Powell pistol-whipped Frederick, beating him bloody and knocking him to the floor unconscious. Bell fled the house, screaming "Murder! Murder!", and raced to the office of General Christopher C. Augur next door for help.

Powell's pistol-whip attack on Frederick left his revolver completely broken, useless. Thus, in a rage-fueled frenzy, Powell drew out his knife and burst through Seward's bedroom door. Inside were Seward's Army nurse, Sergeant George F. Robinson, and Fanny Seward. Powell slashed Robinson on the forearm, and the soldier fell; Powell pushed Fanny aside and leapt onto the bed. He savagely began knifing Seward in the face and throat. Seward, however, was wearing a metal and canvas splint on his jaw, which deflected most of Powell's blows. Powell nonetheless managed to cut through and slice open Seward's right cheek and along the right side of his throat, causing a large amount of blood flow which Seward began choking on. (Note: Seward was badly maimed for life by this attack.) Believing Seward to be dead, Powell hesitated.

Meanwhile, terrified by Fanny and Bell's screams of "Murder!", Herold fled on his own steed, leaving Powell on his own to escape from Seward's mansion. At 10:15pm, just as Booth mortally wounded President Lincoln at Ford's Theatre, Seward's other son, Augustus Henry Seward, burst into the room. Powell stabbed him several times after Augustus dragged Powell onto the floor. Robinson and Augustus Seward wrestled with the strong, uninjured Powell. Powell stabbed Robinson in the shoulder and slashed a portion of Augustus' scalp from his head, before making his escape.

Powell was confronted by State Department messenger Emerick "Bud" Hansell in the hallway. Hansell had just arrived at the house moments earlier and found the front door ajar. As Hansell turned to flee, Powell stabbed him in the back. Powell ran down the stairs and out of the house, still in a fit of rage, yelling "I'm mad! I'm mad!" He then threw his knife into the gutter of the street, got onto his waiting horse, and disappeared through the night.

=== Flight and capture ===
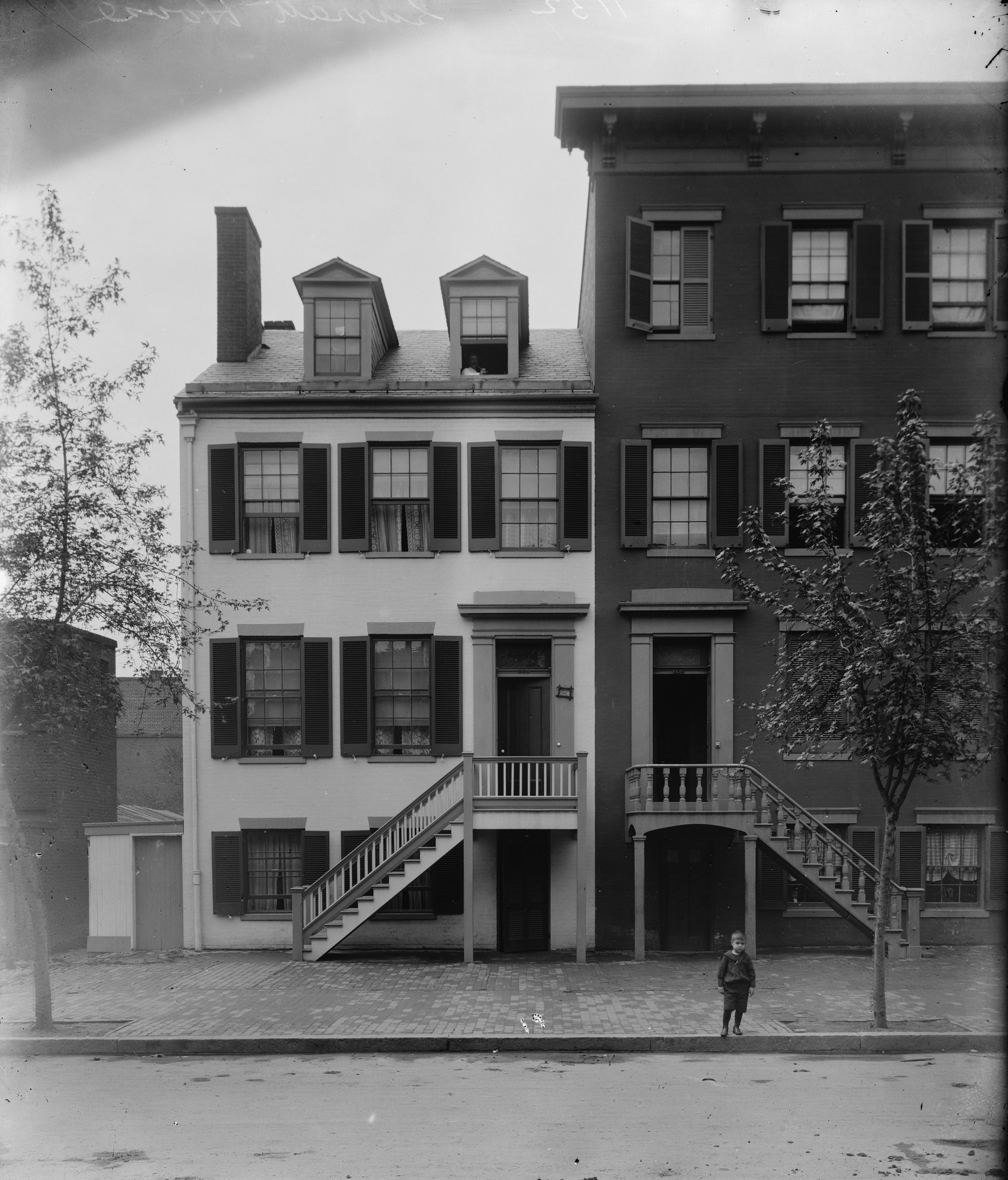
Mary Surratt's boarding house

Powell now realized that David Herold had abandoned him. Powell had almost no knowledge of the streets of Washington, D.C., and without Herold he had no way of locating the streets he was to use for his escape route. (Note: Powell biographer Betty Ownsbey admits that "countless" historians have concluded that Powell did not know his way around the city. Ownsbey, however, asserts he knew his way around and was headed for Baltimore. She cites an 1880 article by J.W. Clampitt, one of Mrs. Surratt's attorneys, in which Clampitt says that Powell told him he was headed for Baltimore.) He mounted his horse, and began riding at a relatively slow pace north on 15th Street.

Powell's exact movements from the time he was seen cantering up 15th Street until the time he appeared at the Surratt boarding house three days later are not clear. It is well established that he ended up (by riding or walking) in the far northeast part of the District of Columbia near Fort Bunker Hill, where he discarded his overcoat. (Note: Ownsbey claims that Fort Bunker Hill is "behind" Congressional Cemetery, but the fort is 4 miles (6.4 km) north-northwest of the cemetery.) In the overcoat pockets were Powell's riding gloves, a false mustache, and a piece of paper with Mary Gardner's name and hotel room number on it. Sources differ widely on what happened next. Historian Ernest B. Furgurson says Powell's horse gave out near Lincoln Hospital (now Lincoln Park), a mile east of the United States Capitol on East Capitol Street. He then hid in "a cemetery" (without specifying which). Ownsbey says Powell hid in a tree for three days.

Historians William C. Edwards and Edward Steers Jr. claim Powell made it to both Fort Bunker Hill and Congressional Cemetery (at 18th and E Streets SE), while Ralph Gary claims that Powell hid out in a marble burial vault at Congressional Cemetery. Andrew Jampoler, however, says Powell just wandered the streets of the city. Whether Powell abandoned his horse, was thrown by it, or both is unclear, and Powell never gave a public or formal statement about what had happened. (Note: The horse was later found near Camp Barry, an artillery training camp on the D.C.-Maryland border at Bladensburg Road and Eastern Avenue.) (Note: Ownsbey gives great weight to an April 3, 1892, article in the New York World newspaper by the Reverend Abram Dunn Gillette. Gillette comforted Powell in the final hours of his life, and Gillette's statement represents the only version which allegedly came from Powell himself. In Gillette's version, Powell says he was closely pursued by cavalry during his escape from Washington. His horse stumbled and Powell was thrown, so he abandoned the animal. Powell says he slept under a tree about a mile from the city, and on Saturday, April 15, he walked two or three miles through forest. Several times, cavalry or scouting parties almost discovered him, and he slept in a tree on Saturday night. Wracked with guilt, yet not willing to be captured, Powell spent Sunday preparing his disguise and Monday walking back into the city.)

Powell decided to return to Surratt's boarding house to seek help. His clothes were somewhat bloody from the attack at Seward's home, and he had dropped his hat at the Seward home. During much of the Victorian era, it was considered unseemly for any man (even a menial laborer) to be seen in public without a hat, and Powell would have been viewed with suspicion had he tried to enter the city without one. Ripping the sleeve from his undershirt, Powell placed the sleeve on his head in the hope that people would think it was a stocking cap. To complete his disguise as a common laborer, he then stole a pickaxe from a farmyard. Powell then headed for Surratt's.

Members of the Metropolitan Police Department of the District of Columbia already suspected John Surratt of complicity in Lincoln's murder, and had visited the Surratt boarding house for the first time as early as 2:00 a.m. on April 15, less than four hours after the attacks. Nothing incriminating was found. Federal authorities decided to make a second visit. Military investigators arrived at about 11:00 p.m. on Monday, April 17, to bring Mrs. Surratt and others in for questioning. As they were about to depart at 11:45 p.m., Powell showed up on the doorstep. Powell claimed to be a menial laborer who had been hired that morning by Mrs. Surratt to dig a gutter in the street. He explained his arrival at the house by saying that he wanted to know what time he should begin work in the morning. His clothes aroused intense suspicion, as he wore rather good quality boots, pants, dress shirt, vest, and coat. His pickaxe seemed unused, and his hands were uncalloused and well manicured (unlike those of a common laborer). Mary denied knowing him. She would later claim that her extremely poor eyesight and the darkness of the room prevented her from recognizing Powell. Powell stood under a bright lamp just 5 feet (1.5 m) from her when she made her denial.

Taken into custody, Powell was discovered to have a box of pistol cartridges, a compass, hair pomade, a brush and comb, two fine handkerchiefs, and a copy of his oath of allegiance (signed "L. Paine") in his pockets. These were not the possessions of a menial laborer. Although he claimed he was a poor man who barely earned a dollar a day for ditch-digging, Powell's wallet contained $25 (~$526.00 in 2025). About 3:00 a.m. on April 18, William Bell identified Powell as the man who assaulted Seward. Powell was formally arrested, and imprisoned aboard the USS Saugus, a Union monitor then at anchor in the Anacostia River at the Washington Navy Yard. A second identification was made around mid-morning on April 18 when Augustus Seward visited the Saugus and positively identified Powell as the man who attacked him and his father.

== Trial ==
The federal government arrested a great many people for their role in the Lincoln assassination. Arrests included John T. Ford, owner of Ford's Theatre; Ford's brothers, James and Harry Clay Ford; John "Peanuts" Burroughs, the African American boy who unwittingly held Booth's horse in the alley behind Ford's Theatre; Mary Surratt's brother, John Zadoc "Zad" Jenkins; Surratt's boarder, 15-year-old Honora Fitzpatrick; and many others. Some, like Judson Jarboe, had merely seen one of the key conspirators walk by. All were released, although many were incarcerated for up to 40 days or more.

The most important prisoners were kept aboard monitors, to prevent escape as well as any effort to free them. Along with Powell on the Saugus were Michael O'Laughlen, Samuel Arnold, Edman Spangler, and George Atzerodt's cousin, Hartmann Richter – who had harbored Atzerodt for four days. Aboard the USS Montauk were David Herold, George Atzerodt—he was later moved to the Saugus—and the body of John Wilkes Booth. Samuel Mudd and Mary Surratt were held at the Old Capitol Prison – now the site of the United States Supreme Court Building. (Note: Also on the Montauk was Joao Celestino, a Portuguese ship captain. He had the unfortunate luck to be overhead on April 14 advocating the assassination of William H. Seward. He was arrested in Philadelphia on April 18 and transferred to the Montauk on April 25.)

=== Confinement ===
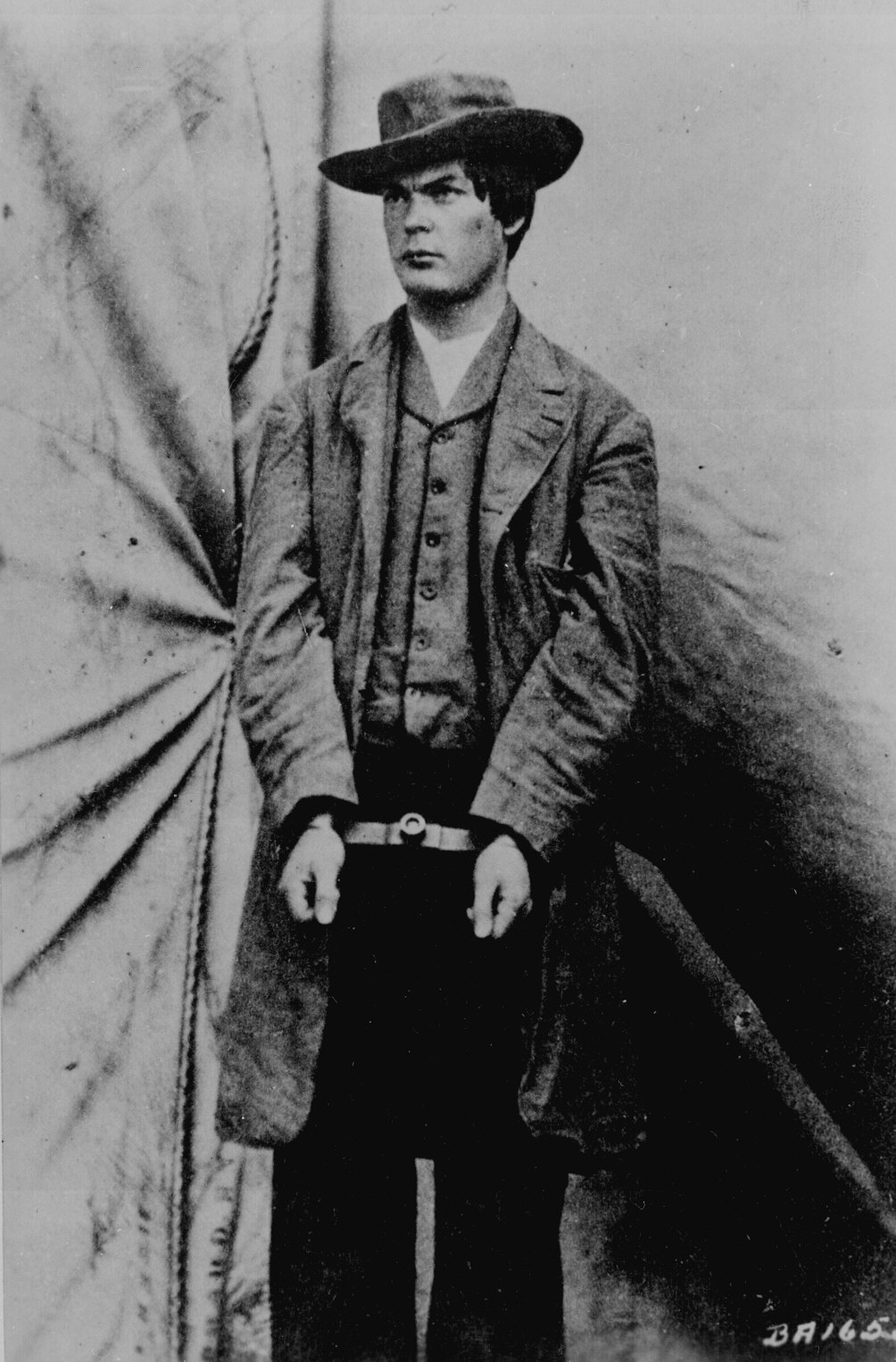
Powell in the hat and overcoat he had worn on the night of the attack

Reporters were denied access to the prisoners, but photographer Alexander Gardner received clearance. On April 27, Gardner began taking photographs of those who were caught up in the government's dragnet. One by one, each prisoner was brought on deck and photographed in a few positions. Gardner took far more photographs of Powell than anyone else. Powell obliged Gardner by posing seated, standing, with and without restraints, and modeling the overcoat and hat that he had worn the night of the Seward attacks. Among the most famous of the photographs is one in which Powell sits against the gun turret of the Saugus, staring into the camera in a modern fashion, relaxed and direct.

Powell's confinement was not easy. He was constantly shackled with a form of manacles known as "lily irons," a riveted handcuff that had two separate iron bands on each wrist that prevented bending of the wrist or use of the hands independently. Like all the male prisoners, a heavy iron ball at the end of a 6-foot (1.8 m) long chain was manacled to one of his legs. Shackles were riveted closed about the ankles, which caused Powell's feet to swell considerably. (Note: Powell's feet remained swollen, and during the trial he shuffled into court wearing nothing but stockings because his feet were too swollen for boots.) Like all the prisoners, he had only a straw pallet on which to sit or lie and a single blanket for warmth. The same meal was served four times a day: coffee or water, bread, salted pork, and beef or beef soup. On April 29, all the prisoners aboard the monitors and at the Old Capitol Prison were moved to newly constructed cells at the Washington Arsenal.

The prisoners were not permitted to bathe or wash until May 4, when all bindings and clothes were removed and they were permitted to bathe in cold water in the presence of a soldier. In early May, General John F. Hartranft, special provost marshal overseeing the prisoners, began improving the living conditions. Powell and the other prisoners began to receive fresh clothing—including undergarments—more frequently, more food, and writing instruments. When Powell was observed raising the iron ball to his head, Hartranft feared Powell might be contemplating suicide, and had the ball removed on June 2. Living conditions improved again on June 18, when the prisoners were given a box to sit on, outdoor exercise time each day, and reading material and chewing tobacco after each meal.

On April 22, Powell repeatedly banged his head into the iron walls of his cell aboard the Saugus. Whether it was a suicide attempt, as his jailers believed, or not, it deeply alarmed military officials. A canvas padded hood, with only a slit for the mouth and nostrils, was fashioned. Powell and all the other prisoners aboard the monitors were forced to wear them 24 hours a day, seven days a week, to prevent any further suicide attempts. Only Mary Surratt and Mudd were not required to wear the hoods. Powell cried when the hood was placed on him. The hoods were hot, claustrophobic, and uncomfortable, and in the humid confines of the monitors in the steaming Washington summer, the prisoners suffered immensely. On June 6, Hartranft ordered them removed except for Powell's.

The apparent suicide attempt worried prison officials for another reason. Powell allegedly could not remember what state or country he had been born in or his age. Military personnel became concerned that he was insane or was being driven mad by his confinement. Three physicians were called in to determine his sanity, and on June 17, he was interviewed for three hours and 40 minutes by Major Thomas Akaryote and John T. Gray. The military tribunal later ruled him sane. With Booth dead and John Surratt still at large, Powell was the individual who knew most about the conspiracy, and government officials pressed him for information. Major Thomas T. Eckert spent hours with Powell over the weeks until his execution, trying to get him to talk.

=== Trial ===
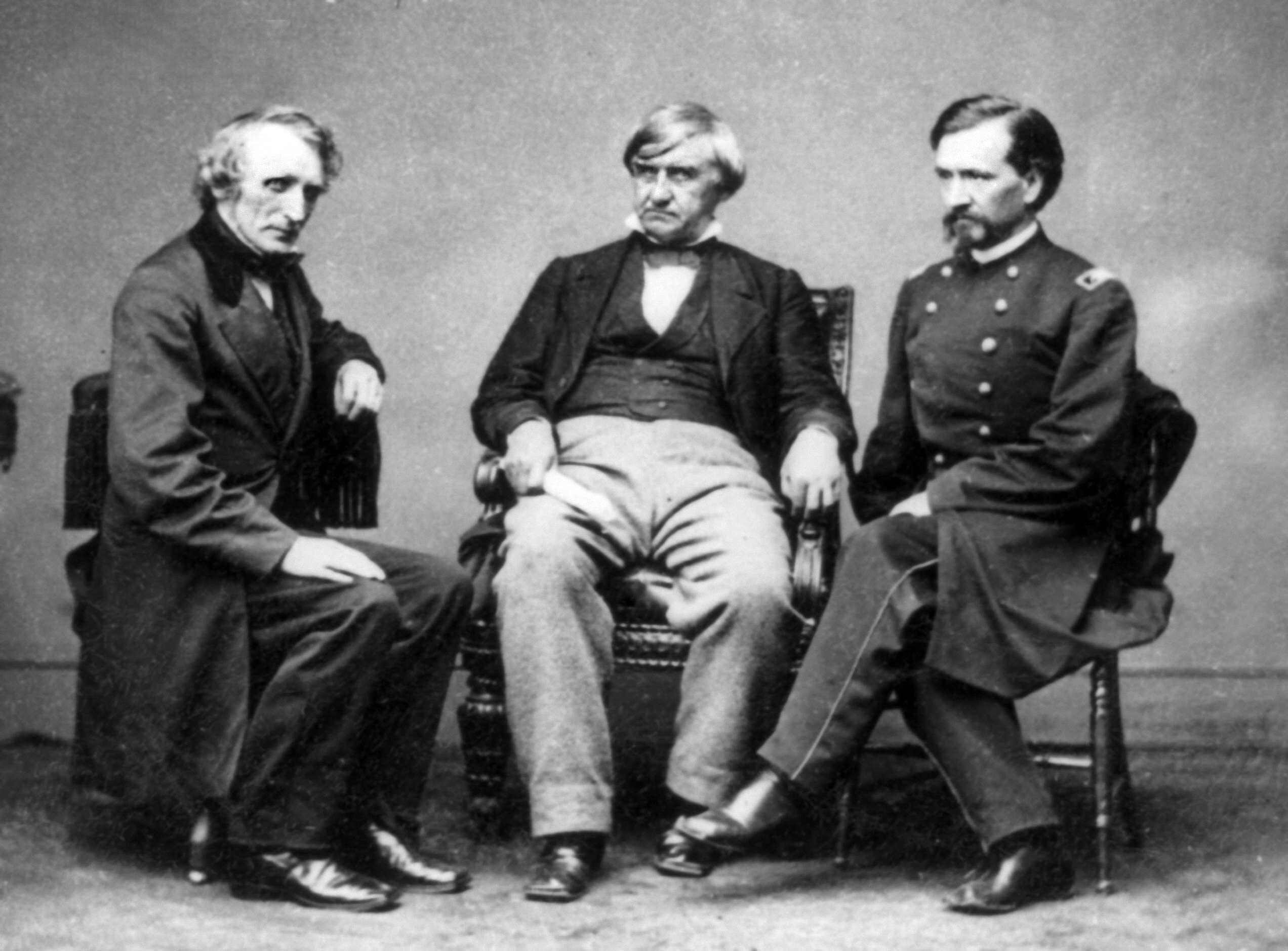
The prosecution was led by John A. Bingham, Joseph Holt, and Henry Lawrence Burnett.

The trial of the alleged conspirators began on May 9. A military tribunal, rather than a civilian court, was chosen as the prosecutorial venue because government officials thought that its more lenient rules of evidence would enable the court to get to the bottom of what was then perceived by the public as a vast conspiracy. A military tribunal also avoided the possibility of jury nullification since federal officials worried that a jury drawn from the pro-Southern populace of the District of Columbia might free the prisoners. All eight alleged conspirators were tried simultaneously.

The prosecution was led by Judge Advocate General Brigadier General Joseph Holt, assisted by Assistant Judge Advocate General Colonel Henry Lawrence Burnett, and Judge Advocate Major John Bingham. A panel of nine judges, all military officers, sat in judgment over the accused. Conviction required a simple majority of judges, while imposition of the death sentence required a two-thirds majority. The only appeal was directly to the President of the United States. (Note: Article I, Section 9 of the United States Constitution permits the suspension of the writ of habeas corpus during times of rebellion or whenever the public safety requires it. On April 27, 1861, President Lincoln issued an executive order suspending the writ of habeas corpus. Although the executive order was later successfully challenged in the courts (Ex parte Milligan, 71 U.S. 2 [1866]), Congress passed the Habeas Corpus Suspension Act of 1863, affirming Lincoln's executive order. The act gave President Johnson the power to suspend writs of habeas corpus, effectively making direct appeal to the president for mercy or clemency the only option.)

A room on the northeast corner of the third floor of the Arsenal was used as a courtroom. The prisoners sat together on long benches wearing wrist and ankle manacles and an armed guard on either side of each of them. The exception was Surratt, who sat in a chair unmanacled. Surratt and Powell received the most press attention during the trial.

Powell did not have legal representation until the third day of the trial. James Mason Campbell, son-in-law of late Supreme Court Chief Justice Roger B. Taney, declined to represent him. On the second day, Burnett asked Colonel William E. Doster to assume Powell's defense. John Atzerodt had hired Doster to represent his brother, George Atzerodt, during the trial. Although reluctant since he had his hands full with one client, Doster agreed, but for weeks, Powell refused to speak to Doster.

The prosecution opened its case against Powell on May 13. Weichmann tied Powell strongly to the Booth-led conspiracies against Lincoln. Slowly, the public realized that "Lewis Payne," the name used to formally charge the individual with conspiracy, attempted murder, and murder, was really someone named Lewis Powell. Court testimony turned to other issues for a week before the prosecution's case against Powell resumed. Seward's butler, William Bell, his son Augustus Seward, and Sergeant George F. Robinson testified about the attack on the Secretary of State and identified Powell as the assailant. The Herndon House landlady testified that Powell rented a room from her, while two police officers discussed Powell's arrest. A long list of other witnesses testified about minor pieces of evidence – such as the discovery of Powell's knife in the gutter and the recovery of his abandoned horse.

Bell's testimony proved to be a turning point. Powell was freed from his restraints and was obliged to put on his hat and overcoat. He placed his hands on Bell as if to shove him aside. Bell's reaction provoked much laughter in the courtroom, even from Powell. However, Powell was rattled by the testimony and finally agreed to speak with Doster about himself and his case. Powell expressed remorse for hurting Frederick Seward, but most of his discussion was disjointed and rambling, and he still could not remember his age or place of birth. (Note: Ownsbey suggests that Powell was purposefully playing dumb to protect his friends and family or that Powell may have been suffering trauma from his extended hooding.) Doster became convinced that Powell was half-witted. Although Powell revealed his real name, the name of his father, and where his parents lived, Powell's many fabrications left Doster too distrustful of those facts to act on them. Doster did not write to George Powell in Florida until nearly a month had passed.

The defense opened its case on June 21. Doster's defense of Powell was essentially a plea for his life. The weight of evidence against Powell was so overwhelming that Doster never attempted to disprove his guilt. Rather, Doster characterized Powell's actions as those of a soldier who "aimed at the head of a department instead of a corps". On June 2, Doster suggested to the court that Powell was insane. Dr. Charles Henry Nichols, superintendent of the Government Hospital for the Insane, testified as to his belief that Powell was insane, as did the two guards who watched over Powell. However, despite additional examinations by a number of physicians, none of them found Powell insane. Many claimed he was stupid or slow-witted, but none found him insane.

Doster made one last bid to save Powell's life by arguing that Powell had not killed Lincoln or Seward and so his life should be spared. Doster ignored the conspiracy laws of the day, which incorporated the concept of vicarious liability, which meant that Powell was responsible for Lincoln's murder even if the original conspiracy were to kidnap, rather than kill, and even if Booth had acted to kill without Powell's knowledge or consent.

== Execution ==
=== Execution eve ===
The nine judges of the military tribunal began considering the guilt and sentencing of the co-conspirators on June 29. About an hour was spent considering each defendant's guilt. On June 30, the tribunal began voting on the charges facing each individual. They disposed of the Herold and Atzerodt cases before considering Powell's guilt. He was found guilty of all charges, except the two counts of conspiracy with Edman Spangler. The tribunal sentenced Powell to death. President Johnson affirmed the verdicts and sentences on July 5, following an inevitable appeal.

On July 6, the verdicts were made public. General Winfield Scott Hancock and General Hartranft began informing the prisoners of their sentences at noon the same day. Powell was the first to be told that he was found guilty and sentenced to die, and he accepted his fate stoically. Powell asked to see two ministers: Reverend Augustus P. Stryker, an Episcopalian minister at St. Barnabas Church in Baltimore and a Confederate sympathizer, and the Reverend Doctor Abram Dunn Gillette, a loyal Unionist and pastor at the First Baptist Church in Washington, D.C. Gillette arrived shortly after Powell made his request. Powell spent several hours with Gillette, whom he had seen preach in Baltimore in February 1865. Powell told Gillette about his background, how he came to be involved in the conspiracy, and how much he regretted his actions, which he still justified as those of a soldier. Powell wept profusely during portions of their interview, and blamed Confederate leaders for his predicament.

Powell strenuously attempted to exonerate Mary Surratt. According to one source, Powell asked Gillette to bring Captain Christian Rath to him. Rath came, and Powell declared that Surratt knew nothing of the conspiracy and was innocent. Rath conferred with Eckert, and within an hour had taken down Powell's statement for consideration by President Johnson. Another source, however, says that it was the two Roman Catholic priests who were consoling Mary Surratt, Father Jacob Walter and Father B.F. Wiget, and Surratt's daughter, Anna, who visited Powell that evening and elicited the statement declaring Mrs. Surratt innocent. Whichever version is true (perhaps both), Powell's statement had no effect on anyone with authority to prevent Surratt's execution. Powell was the only one of the conspirators to make a statement exonerating Surratt.

Gillette spent the night with Powell, who alternately prayed and wept; near dawn he fell asleep for three hours. Reverend Stryker was on his way to Washington, but would not receive permission to see Powell until noon the following day.

=== Execution ===
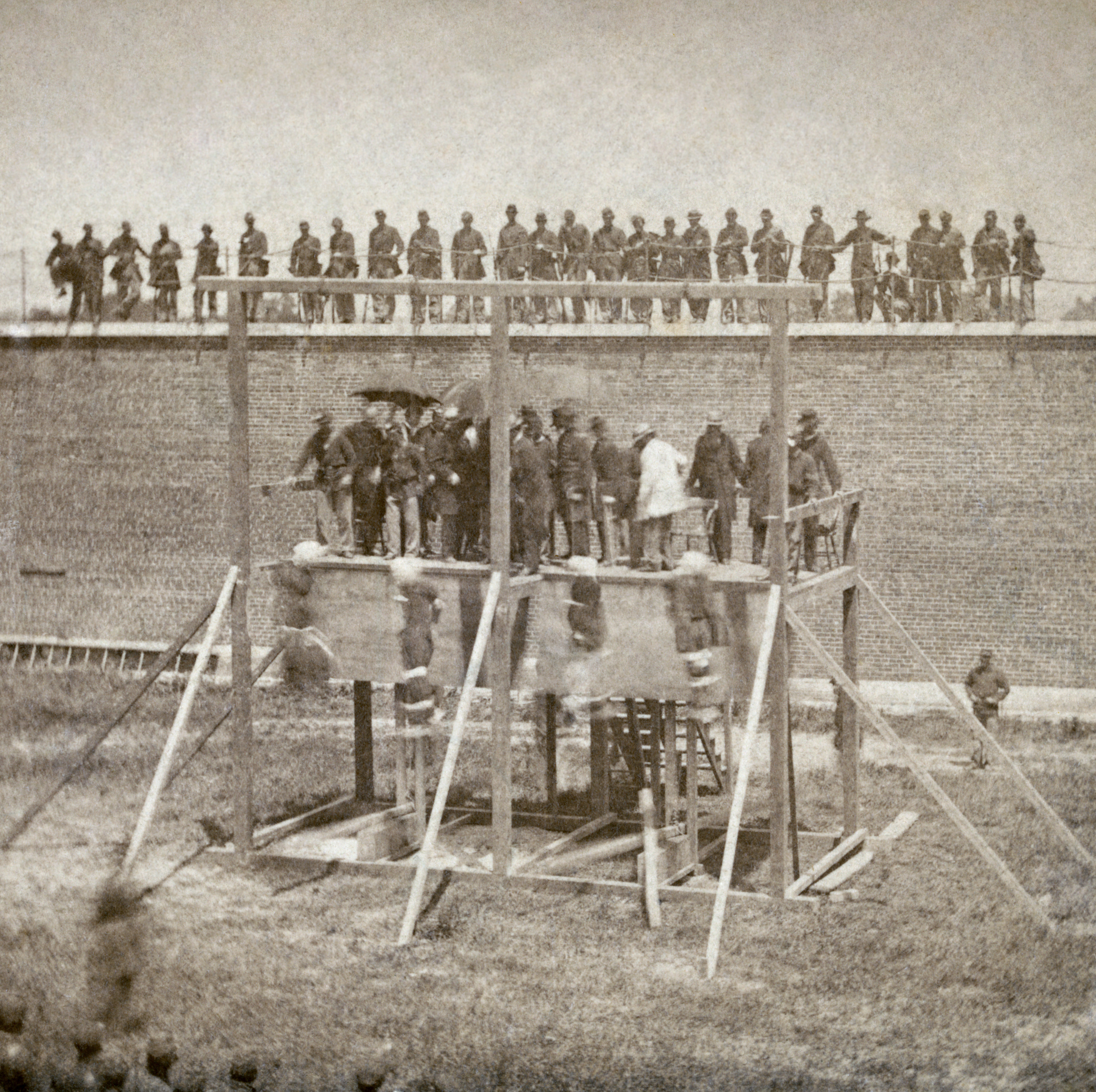
The execution of Mary Surratt, Lewis Powell, David Herold, and George Atzerodt

A gallows was constructed in the Arsenal courtyard 12 feet (3.7 m) high and large enough for all four condemned to be hanged at once. Powell asked to see General Hartranft and impressed upon him once more Mary Surratt's innocence. Hartranft wrote a memorandum to President Johnson outlining Powell's statement, adding that he believed Powell to be telling the truth. Powell then made a statement exonerating Atzerodt and declared that Atzerodt refused to kill Vice President Johnson even though Booth had ordered him to do so.

At 1:15 p.m., July 7, 1865, the prisoners were taken through the courtyard and up the steps of the gallows. Each prisoner's ankles and wrists were manacled. More than 1,000 people, including government officials, members of the US armed forces, friends and family of the condemned, official witnesses, and reporters, watched from the Arsenal courtyard and the tops of its walls. Alexander Gardner, who had photographed Powell and the others two months before, photographed the execution for the government.

Hartranft read the execution order as the condemned sat in chairs. White cloth was used to bind their arms to their sides, and to tie their ankles and thighs together. On Powell's behalf Gillette thanked the prison officials for their kindness, and said a prayer for Powell's soul; Powell's eyes filled with tears. Powell said, "Mrs. Surratt is innocent. She doesn't deserve to die with the rest of us".

The prisoners were asked to stand and move forward a few feet to the nooses. After the noose was put in place, a white bag was placed over the head of each prisoner. Powell said to Rath through his hood, "I thank you, goodbye." Rath clapped his hands, and soldiers knocked the supports from under the drops. Surratt and Atzerodt seemed to die quickly. By contrast, Herold and Powell struggled for nearly five minutes. Powell's body swung about wildly, and once or twice his legs came up so that he was almost in a sitting position.

== Burial ==
The bodies were allowed to hang for about 30 minutes before being cut down and placed in wooden gun boxes.The name of each deceased was written on a piece of paper and placed in the box in a glass vial. They were buried, along with Booth, against the east wall of the prison yard. In 1867, the coffins were reburied elsewhere within the Arsenal. In February 1869, after much pleading from the Booths and Surratts, President Johnson agreed to turn the bodies over to their families.

There is some dispute about what happened next. Historian Betty Ownsbey says that Powell's family expressed a wish to reclaim the remains, but did not do so. Historian Richard Bak believes Powell's remains were interred at Graceland Cemetery in Washington, D.C. Powell's remains were disinterred and reburied at Holmead's Burying Ground. According to Powell family legend, Bak says, the family went to Washington in 1871 to retrieve Lewis' remains; the skull was missing. On the return trip to Florida, George Powell fell ill, and Lewis Powell's remains were temporarily interred on a nearby farm.

In 1879, the remains were retrieved and the headless corpse was buried in Geneva, Florida. Betty Ownsbey says this is nothing more than a fanciful story. She argues that the events could not have occurred as related by family members, for the city of Washington, D.C., would have issued a disinterment order as well as issued a receipt for the body—neither of which occurred. There are also other reasons to believe the family legend is inaccurate. Graceland Cemetery (a burial ground primarily for African Americans) did not open until 1872, but Powell was reburied before that. Graceland closed in 1894, a date which does not fit with the date of the Holmead's burial as related by Bak or Ownsbey. (Note: Griffin provides a much truncated version of this story, and claims that Powell's body was claimed by his father and older brother and buried next to his mother in Geneva, Florida.)

Other documents describe an alternative series of events. According to this version, Powell's family declined to retrieve the body, at which point Powell was buried at Holmead's Burying Ground in either June 1869 or February 1870. A. H. Gawler of Gawler's Funeral Home handled the reburial. The burial site was unmarked, and only Gawler and a few Army personnel knew where Powell was interred at Holmead's.

Holmead's closed in 1874, and for the next decade bodies were disinterred and reburied elsewhere. Family members and friends reclaimed about 1,000 bodies. The remains of 4,200 Caucasians were removed to Rock Creek Cemetery, while several hundred African American remains were reinterred at Graceland Cemetery. According to the Washington Evening Star newspaper, Powell's body was exhumed by Gawler's on December 16, 1884. The identifying glass vial was recovered, but the paper it was supposed to contain was missing. Wesley Pippenger, a historian who has studied Holmead's Burying Ground, asserts that Powell's remains were buried at Graceland Cemetery. (Note: Pippenger cites The Sunday Star article of February 22, 1870; Allen C. Clark's 1925 Records of the Columbia Historical Society article; and John Claggett Proctor's The Sunday Star article of December 1, 1929, as sources for the Graceland claim. But none of these sources say where Powell was reinterred.) With unclaimed white remains at Graceland moved to mass graves at Rock Creek Cemetery, Powell's remains may lie there.

Powell biographer Betty Ownsbey suggests a third sequence of events. She argues Powell was interred at Graceland Cemetery, but that his remains were disinterred some time between 1870 and 1884, and moved to Holmead's Burying Ground. Powell's remains were disinterred in 1884, and buried in a mass grave in Section K, Lot 23, at Rock Creek Cemetery.

=== Discovery and burial of Powell's skull ===
In 1991, a Smithsonian Institution researcher discovered Powell's skull in the museum's Native American skull collection. After extensive research, Smithsonian and U.S. Army investigators came to believe that A.H. Gawler removed the skull at the time of its 1869/1870 interment. The skull was then donated in 1885 to the Army Medical Museum. At that time, it was stenciled with the accession number 2244 and the capital letter "P". The museum's documentation shows that the skull came from "Payne", a criminal who had been executed by hanging. The Army gave the skull to the Smithsonian on May 7, 1898, and somehow it became mixed with the Native American collection.

The Smithsonian contacted Powell's nearest living relative, his 70-year-old great-niece Helen Alderman, who requested that the skull be turned over to her. Verification of Alderman's relationship took two years. On November 12, 1994, Lewis Powell's skull was buried next to the grave of his mother, Caroline Patience Powell, at Geneva Cemetery.

== Portrayal ==
Powell was portrayed by Titus Welliver in the 1998 film The Day Lincoln Was Shot and by Norman Reedus in the 2011 Robert Redford film The Conspirator.

Powell appeared in the second episode of the first season of Timeless and was portrayed by Kurt Ostlund. In the episode, he goes to kill William Seward, but is stopped and killed by Wyatt Logan (Matt Lanter).
