= George F. Robinson =

American soldier (1832–1907)

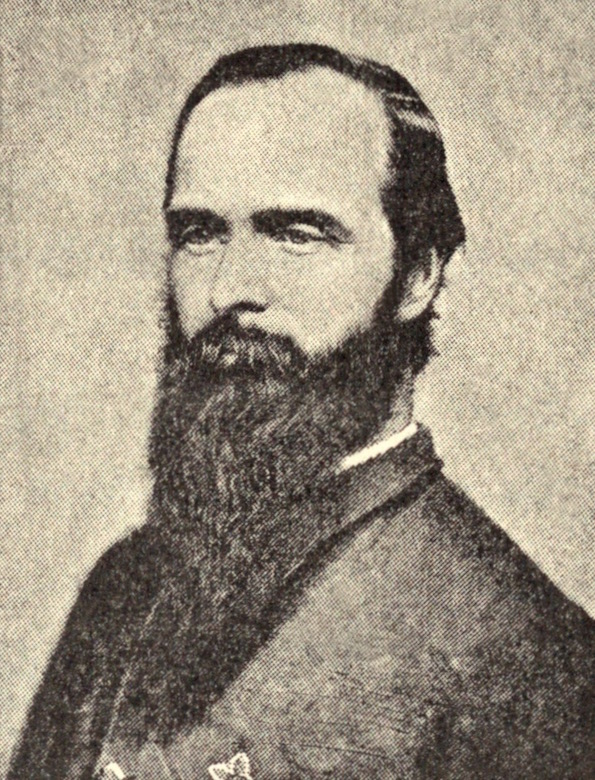
- Born: George Foster Robinson; August 13, 1832; Hartford, Maine
- Died: August 16, 1907 (aged 75); Pomona, California
- Spouse: Roxinda Aurora Clark Robinson
- Military career
- Allegiance: United States
- Branch: United States Army
- Service years: 1863–1865, 1879–1896
- Rank: Major
- Unit: 8th Maine Infantry
- Awards: Congressional Gold Medal

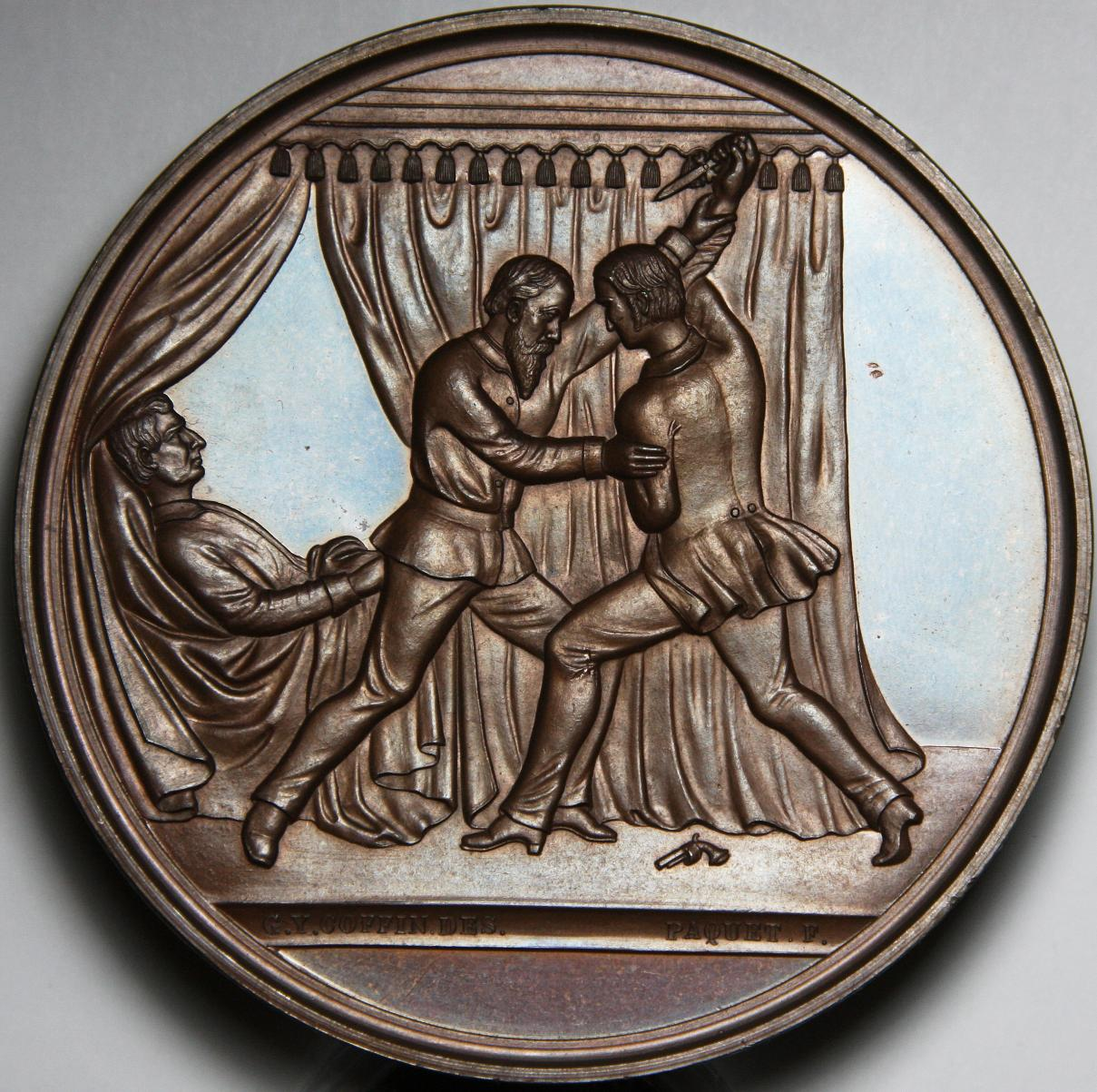
Medal presented to George F. Robinson for saving William H. Seward's life

George Foster Robinson (August 13, 1832 – August 16, 1907) was a soldier of the United States Army and the attendant of Secretary of State William H. Seward who was best known for his role in foiling the assassination attempt of William Seward by Lewis Powell for which he was awarded the Congressional Gold Medal in 1871.

Robinson joined the 8th Maine Infantry in August 1863, and was serving as an attendant to Seward while recovering from battlefield wounds. He was honorably discharged in May 1865 but returned to the Army as a major in June 1879, and was retired in August 1896 after serving for 20 years.

== Life ==
George F. Robinson was born to Isaac Watts Robinson and Deborah Thomas in Hartford, Maine, in 1832. Robinson was enlisted, in Company B, 8th Maine Volunteer Infantry Regiment.

He was wounded on 20 May 1864 at the Battle of Ware Bottom Church in Virginia and was honorably discharged from 8th Infantry Regiment Maine on 17 May 1865. But he returned to the Army as a major in 1879, and served till his retirement in 1896.

Robinson died of pneumonia at age 75 on August 16, 1907, in Pomona, California. He is buried at Arlington National Cemetery near Washington, D.C.

== Assassination attempt of William Seward ==
John Wilkes Booth had originally planned to kidnap Lincoln, and recruited conspirators, including Lewis Powell. When Booth decided to kill Lincoln, Andrew Johnson, and Seward in order to create chaos in the federal government and possibly save the South, Powell was assigned the task of killing Seward. At 10:10 P.M. on April 14, 1865, just as Booth was preparing to shoot Lincoln at Ford's Theater by gaining entry to the unguarded presidential box, Powell entered Seward's home, pretending to deliver medicine to Seward, who was in bed recovering from injuries sustained in a carriage accident. Denied entry to Seward's room by one of the suspicious family members, including the African American maître d’hôtel and Frederick, Powell started back down the stairs, but suddenly turned and drew his revolver, pointing it at Frederick's forehead. He pulled the trigger, but the gun misfired. Powell then struck Frederick several times with the pistol, and he crumpled to the floor unconscious. Fanny Seward came out of her father's room to see her brother bloody and unconscious on the floor and Powell running towards her. After Powell shoved her aside, he ran to Seward's bed and began stabbing him repeatedly in the face and neck. He missed the first time he swung his knife down, but the third blow sliced open Seward's cheek. The splint on Seward's broken jaw was the only thing that prevented Powell's blade from penetrating Seward's jugular vein.

Private George F. Robinson, a soldier assigned to attend the secretary, and Seward's son Augustus, an army officer, tried to drive Powell away. Augustus had been asleep in his room, but was awakened by Fanny's screams of terror. David Herold, a Booth conspirator, waited outside; he had been assigned to guide Powell, who was unfamiliar with the streets of Washington. Hearing Fanny scream, Herold ran away, abandoning Powell. The force of Powell's blows had driven Secretary Seward off the bed and onto the floor behind the bed where Powell could not reach him. Powell fought off Robinson and Augustus, stabbing both Robinson and Augustus in the process, and escaped through the front after stabbing Emerick Hansell, a messenger who was bringing a telegram to Seward. Despite Robinson's own injury, he and Fanny immediately applied first aid to the wounded Secretary of State, stopping his bleeding and saving his life.

== 1871 Congressional Gold Medal ==
On March 1, 1871, American Congress approved the award of the Congressional Gold Medal to Private (later Major) Robinson, who was credited with fighting off Lewis Powell and saving the life of Secretary of State William Seward on 14 April 1865. Robinson received this specially struck medal, the thanks of Congress and a monetary reward in honor of his bravery.

== Renaming of May Mountain to Robinson Mountain ==
On March 24, 1965, the Maine Legislature resolved to rename May Mountain, on whose slopes Robinson had been raised, to Robinson Mountain.
