= Joseph Gerhardt =

German American restaurateur and colonel

Joseph P. Gerhardt
- Born: May 25, 1817; Bonn, Kingdom of Prussia
- Died: August 19, 1881 (aged 64); Washington, D.C., U.S.
- Burial place: Prospect Hill Cemetery, Washington, D.C., U.S.
- Military career
- Allegiance: United States of America; Union
- Branch: United States Army; Union Army
- Service years: 1861–1863
- Rank: Colonel; Brevet Brigadier General
- Commands: 46th New York Volunteer Infantry
- Conflicts: American Civil War
- Other work: Restaurant owner, Public Servant

Joseph P. Gerhardt (May 25, 1817 – August 19, 1881) was a German American restaurant and bar owner who became a colonel in the Union Army during the American Civil War. He was breveted a brigadier general in 1863 for gallantry in the field.

== Life and career ==
Gerhardt was born in Bonn, Kingdom of Prussia (now Germany) in 1817, and educated at the University of Bonn. He took part in the Revolutions of 1848 in the city of Rastatt, where he led a battalion of revolutionaries. After the collapse of the revolution, he was forced to leave the country for his own safety and fled to the United States via Switzerland, arriving in America in 1850.

Gerhardt took up residence in Washington, D.C., which at the time had a large immigrant German population. A prominent Forty-Eighter, he established the Capitol Garden Restaurant, a beer garden, bar, and restaurant at 2nd Street and Maryland Avenue. He was frequently arrested for selling liquor on Sundays in violation of Sunday closing laws.

Gerhardt was politically active and favored the nascent Republican movement, although he largely hid these affinities due to their controversial nature. He later co-founded the German Republican Association in the city. In June 1857, a mob assaulted Gerhardt's business. Gerhardt shot one of the attackers, Henry Schoulte, and was himself shot and severely wounded. Gerhardt was tried for murder, although the prosecution ended in a hung jury. At a second trial, Gerhardt was found not guilty. In 1860, Gerhardt was elected a delegate to the Republican National Convention as a supporter of Abraham Lincoln.

=== Military career ===
After the election of Lincoln as President of the United States in November 1860, the slave-holding states threatened to secede. Anticipating the outbreak of war, Gerhardt helped organize a 65-member company of volunteer infantry known as the "Turner Rifles" on January 11, 1861. He was elected captain of the company.

He was promoted to major and placed in command of the 46th New York Volunteer Infantry on September 16, 1861. He accompanied the regiment to its temporary station at Annapolis, Maryland, and then in November to its staging area at Hilton Head, South Carolina. From December 1861 to May 1862, he led the unit in the Siege of Fort Pulaski at Tybee Island, Georgia. On June 8, the unit was sent to James Island near Charleston, South Carolina, where Gerhardt led the regiment in battle on June 16, 1862, during the Battle of Secessionville.

The unit returned to the Union base at Newport News, Virginia, in July 1862, where it was assigned to the newly formed IX Corps. He was promoted to lieutenant colonel on July 1, 1861. He fought at the First Battle of Rappahannock Station on August 22 to August 25, 1862, in Culpeper County and Fauquier County, Virginia, and the Second Battle of Bull Run on August 28 to 30, 1862, in Prince William County, Virginia. His unit played a role in helping to stabilize the Union line at Fox's Gap during the Battle of South Mountain on September 14, 1862, near Boonsboro, Maryland. His unit came under friendly fire by the 9th New Hampshire Volunteer Infantry before reaching the line of combat, and his soldiers only saved themselves by throwing themselves down on the ground. Although the IX Corps participated in the Battle of Fredericksburg on December 11 to 15, 1862, in and around Fredericksburg, Virginia, Gerhardt's unit was held in reserve and he did not fight in the battle. His unit provided covering fire for crossings of the Rappahannock River early in the battle. He was promoted to colonel on December 17. He stayed with the unit when it went into winter quarters at Falmouth, Virginia.

In mid-June 1863, the IX Corps was reassigned to the Army of the Tennessee. Gerhardt commanded the 46th New York Volunteers as it participated in the Siege of Vicksburg (then nearing its conclusion), and in the Jackson Expedition. The unit participated in the capture of Jackson, Mississippi, on July 17. The IX Corps was transferred to the Army of the Ohio in late July, and Gerhardt moved his troops to the army's headquarters at Knoxville, Tennessee. It participated in the Battle of Blue Springs on October 10, 1863, in Greene County, Tennessee. He was honorably mustered out of the volunteers due to an unspecified disability on November 8, 1863.

A friend of President Lincoln's, Gerhardt again attended the Republican National Convention in 1864 as a Lincoln delegate. On July 23, 1866, Gerhardt was breveted to brigadier general effective March 13, 1865.

=== Post-war career and death ===
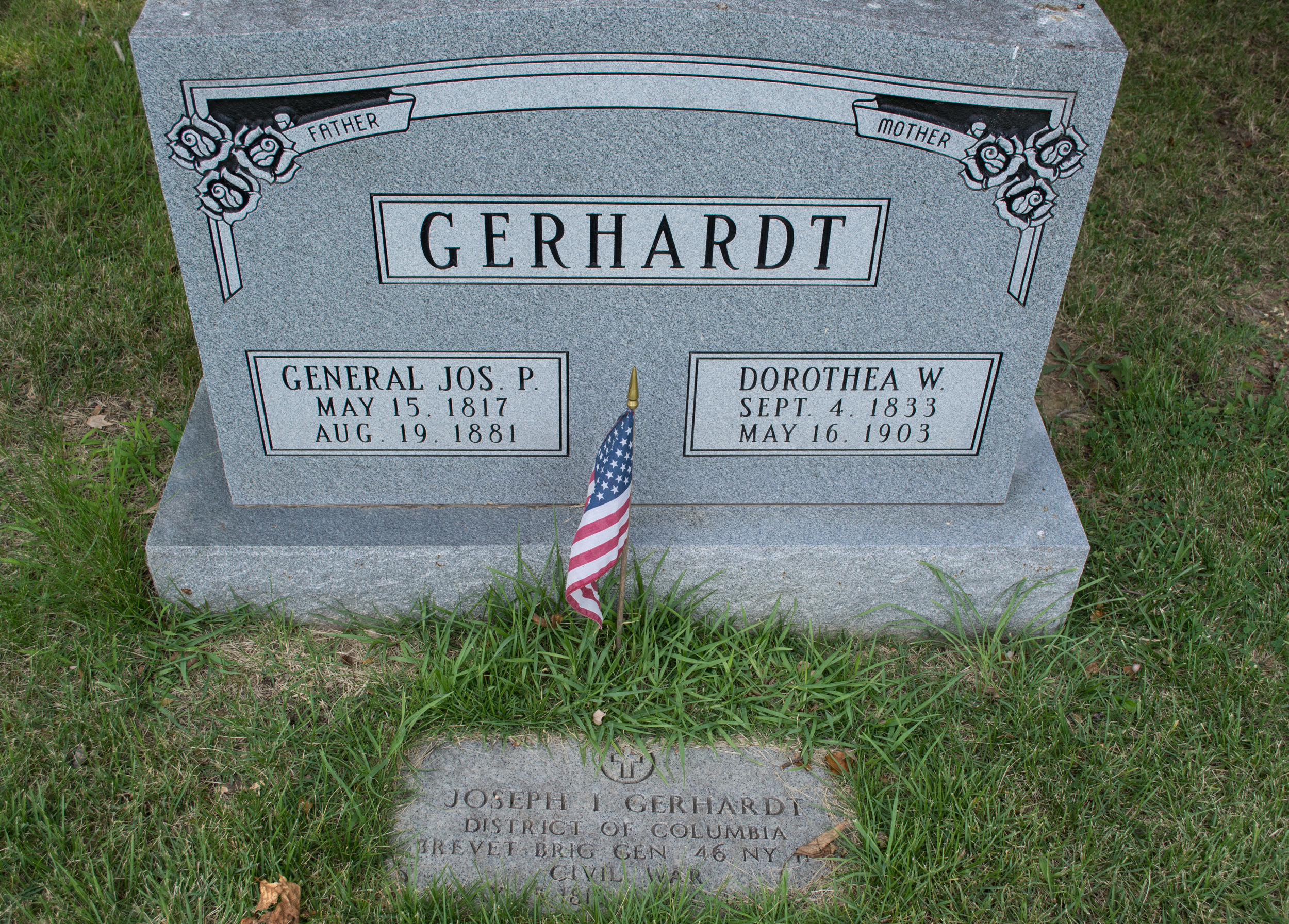
Grave of Joseph Gerhardt at Prospect Hill Cemetery in Washington, D.C.

Gerhardt returned to live in the District of Columbia after the war, where he established a restaurant and remained active in local Republican Party politics as well as German community groups (such as the Washington Schuetzen Verein). In 1867, he sat on the jury in the trial of John Surratt, who was accused of plotting with John Wilkes Booth to assassinate President Lincoln.

In 1877, Gerhardt received a position as a clerk in the United States Department of the Interior. He spent most of his post-war years in ill health due to his wartime service. By 1880, his health had deteriorated so much that he gave up his job at the Interior Department and sold his restaurant business.

Joseph Gerhardt died of unspecified causes at his home in Washington, D.C., on August 19, 1881. He was survived by his wife and seven children. The Washington Saengerbund sang at his funeral. He was buried at Prospect Hill Cemetery in Washington, D.C., and the artillery unit of the District of Columbia militia fired an 11-gun salute over his grave.

Brigadier General Gerhardt's son was Joe Gerhardt, one of the best second basemen of his era in Major League Baseball.

== Bibliography ==
- Eicher, John H. (2001). Civil War High Commands. Stanford, Calif.: Stanford University Press. ISBN 0804736413.
- Heitman, Francis Bernard (1903). Historical Register and Dictionary of the United States Army, from Its Organization, September 29, 1789, to March 2, 1903. Volume 1. Washington, D.C.: Government Printing Office.
- Hoptak, John David (2011). The Battle of South Mountain. Charleston, S.C.: History Press. ISBN 9781596294011.
- Kaufmann, Wilhelm (1999). The Germans in the American Civil War: With a Biographical Directory. Carlisle, Pa.: John Kallmann. ISBN 0965092674.
- Nemec, David (2006). The Great Encyclopedia of Nineteenth Century Major League Baseball. Tuscaloosa, Ala.: University of Alabama Press. ISBN 9780817314996.
- O'Reilly, Francis A. (2003). The Fredericksburg Campaign: Winter War on the Rappahannock. Baton Rouge: Louisiana State University Press. ISBN 0807128090.
- Phisterer, Frederick (1912). New York in the War of the Rebellion: 1861 to 1865. Volume 3. Albany, N.Y.: J.B. Lyon and Co.
- Pierro, Joseph, ed. (2012). The Maryland Campaign of September 1862: Ezra A. Carman's Definitive Study of the Union and Confederate Armies at Antietam. New York: Routledge. ISBN 9781135912390.
- Sickles, Daniel P. (1908). The Union Army: A History of Military Affairs in the Loyal States, 1861-65. Madison, Wisc.: Federal Publishing Co.
- Spingola, Deanna (2011). The Ruling Elite: A Study in Imperialism, Genocide and Emancipation. Bloomington, Ind.: Trafford Publishing. ISBN 9781426954627.
