= Karl Rudolph Powalky =

Karl Rudolph Powalky (19 June 1817 – 11 July 1881) was a German astronomer known for his computational work on estimating cometary paths and minor planets and for his estimation of the solar parallax at 8.83″.

Nothing is known of Powalky's younger days except that he was born in Neudietendorf, Thuringia. He worked at the Hamburg observatory from 1842 to 1847 and worked as a computer for Peter Andreas Hansen from 1850 to 1856. His achievement was in the calculation of the solar parallax of between 8.832″ and 8.86 arcseconds based on observations made during a transit of Venus in 1769 resulting in an estimate of the astronomical unit (AU) which is the mean distance of the Sun from the Earth. This agreed with the value of 8.86” deduced by Léon Foucault and led to a debate with Le Verrier. He moved to the United States in 1873 working briefly in the Census Bureau and later at a naval observatory in Washington. Poor health forced him back to German but he returned and moved to Pennsylvania. He was in contact with Asaph Hall who wrote an obituary for Powalky. He is buried at Prospect Hill Cemetery (Washington, D.C.).
