= Washington Saengerbund =

The Washington Sängerbund is a German choral society founded in 1851 in Washington, D.C. About 50 active singers make up the mixed chorus, which forwards a tradition of preserving German music and German culture in the Washington Metropolitan Area with numerous concerts and musical performances during the year, often in conjunction with other groups. A Spring Concert, a Fall Concert and a traditional German Christmas Concert at United Church on 20th and G St, Washington, D.C. are part of the repertoire. An annual Masquerade Ball at Mardi Gras time and participation at the local Oktoberfest celebrations are some of the other activities.

The Washington Sängerbund's mission statement is to preserve German song and the German language. The organization cultivates the study of music and instructs the members in choral singing and in the theoretical knowledge of music.

== History ==
Early in 1851 a few young Germans of the choir of the Concordia Church (today United Church/Vereinigte Kirche) located at 20th & G Sts., NW in Washington, DC decided to organize a German Singing Society. They were planning to participate as a German chorus in the Second Song Festival of the Nordöstlicher Sängerbund of America, which was to be held in Baltimore, Maryland in June 1851.

The group formed and elected its first president, Julius Viedt. Following an invitation from the members of the new singing club, Mr. Charles Walter of Baltimore accepted the musical directorship and set the date for the first rehearsal for April 12, 1851 at the German Hall on 11th Street, NW between F & G Sts in Washington, DC. But, as it turned out, in those days travel was not that easy and Mr. Walter was unable to attend due to inclement weather. In a letter he explained; "I am sorry for not appearing last night. But I thought I better stay home since I didn't think a rehearsal would get together in this kind of weather. I am happy about your intentions and I will become a member, if chosen as the new director or not. Please go ahead and schedule another rehearsal next Wednesday, April 20, 1851 at 8:30 in the evening at the German Hall." This date marks the first rehearsal of record of the Washington Sängerbund.

The Sängerbund never went to the Song Festival in Baltimore in 1851 because the director felt that the group was not ready. In the following years, however, they began participating in those Song Festivals of the Northeastern Sängerbund and brought home prizes and awards on several occasions. Its first success in the then popular singing competitions came in July 1869 in Baltimore when it won the first prize, a grand piano which it triumphantly brought home to Washington.

During its first 50 years of existence, the Washington Sängerbund grew to be recognized as the stellar singing group in Washington, D.C. and along the entire Eastern seaboard. It performed at many notable occasions and before many dignitaries. The Washington Sängerbund is mentioned in the early history of the United States when during the Civil War in July, 1861 German district soldiers stood at the Great Falls on the Potomac River to guard the local water supply utilities. One of the first two casualties was Henry Ricks, an active member of the Washington Sängerbund. And in 1865, after President Lincoln's death, the Washington newspaper Columbia carried an article on April 22 which stated, "The Sängerbund furnished an honor guard at the head of the bier of the dead President. Suddenly the men from the Sängerbund sang through the silence "Gesang der Geister über den Wassern" by Franz Schubert.

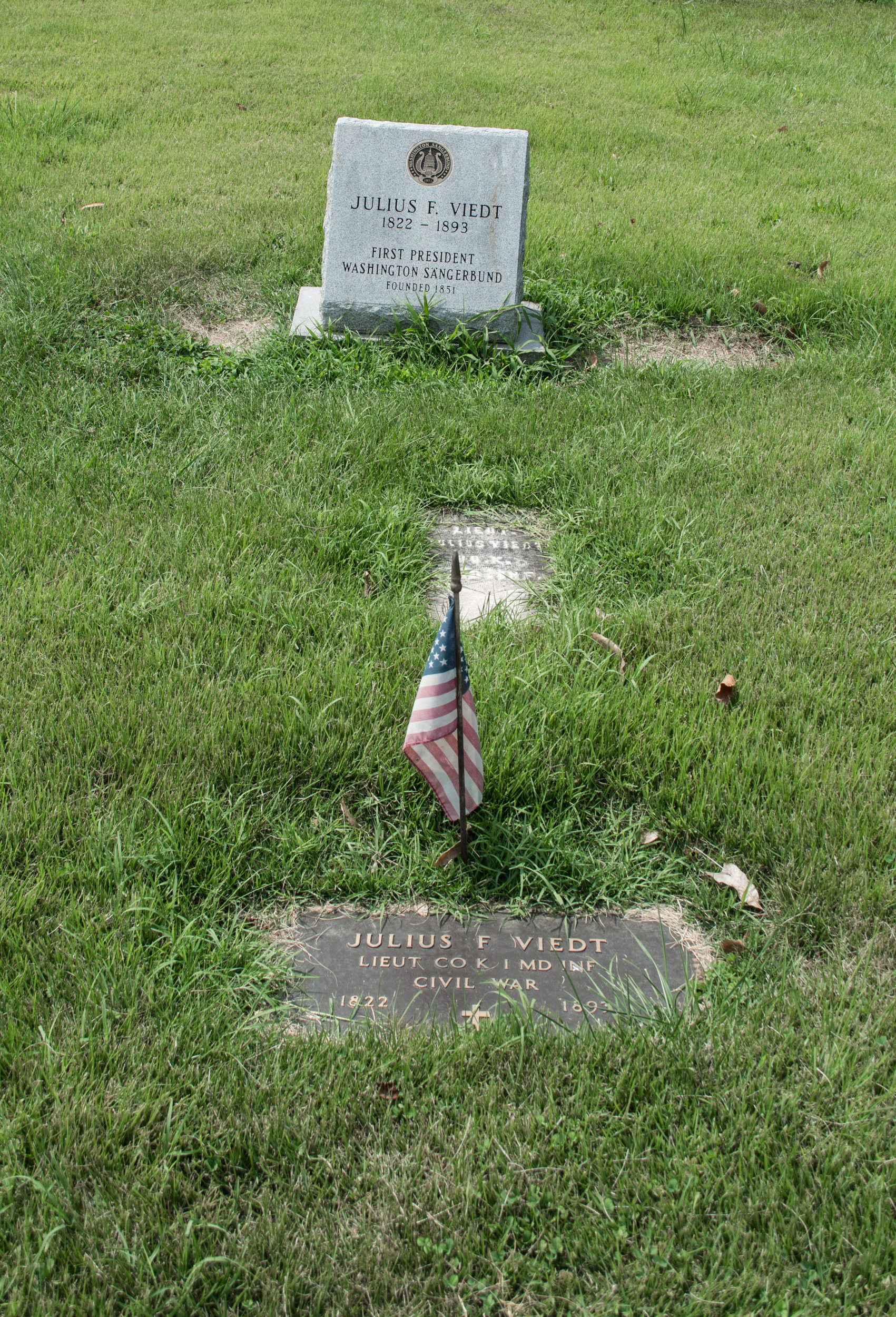
Grave of Julius Viedt, first president of the Washington Saengerbund, at Prospect Hill Cemetery in Washington, D.C.

By 1901, at its 50th anniversary, the Sängerbund had a total of 3,179 members, including 398 active singers, 2,754 passive members and 27 honorary members. By 1929 bad economic conditions and the prohibition caused the Washington Sängerbund to cease operations. It even lost its Sängerbund Hall at 314 C St., NW which it had built, and moved into on December 19, 1893. But in 1934 a new singing organization by the name of the Männergesangverein Washington was founded. After three years the Männergesangverein realized that the original charter was still on record, changed its name and the Washington Sängerbund was reborn. While the Sängerbund had always been a men's chorus, the ladies in 1936 decided to form their own singing society which was to exist for almost 30 years as the Washington Sängerbund Ladies Chorus. In 1967 they eventually decided to join the men to become a mixed chorus.

In 1981 the Washington Sängerbund published a 200-page hard-cover book describing its first 125 years. Frank H. Pierce III and his wife Nancy, both members of the Washington Sängerbund, did extensive research to cover many details of the Sängerbund's role in our nation's capital of Washington DC, reaching back to the days before the Civil War. The book is still available for purchase from the Washington Sängerbund.

The Nordöstlicher Sängerbund serves as an umbrella organization for German-American choruses in the Mid-Atlantic region of the United States and holds a Song Festival (Sängerfest) every three years in a different city. As a member, the Washington Sängerbund has hosted this Song Festival four times: in 1960 at the Uline Arena, in 1973 at the Sheraton Park Hotel, in 1988 at the Washington Hilton Hotel and in 2009 at the National Building Museum. In 1993 it also organized a National Song Festival in Washington, DC with participating choruses from as far away as Germany, the West Coast and Canada. The grand finale was an outdoor concert presented on the west steps of the Capitol with chorus and orchestra.

On May 22–24, 2009 the Nordöstlicher Sängerbund gathered for the 50th time to hold its Sängerfest and our Nation's Capital Washington, DC was selected for the event. The concert with about 300 singers, accompanied by soloists and the orchestra of the National Gallery of Art was held in the grand hall of the historic National Building Museum.

Today the Washington Sängerbund continues its long tradition of preserving German music and German Culture in the Washington Metropolitan area with numerous concerts and musical performances during the year, often in conjunction with other groups. Its repertoire consists of music in the German language and rehearsals are held weekly on Monday evening. In addition the Sängerbund sponsors other social activities such as an annual "German Fasching - Costume Ball", brings authentic German flavor to several local Oktoberfests, or plays host to visiting choruses from Germany.

The Washington Saengerbund is directly associated with the Concord Club, the private social club of German Americans and German culture interested folks. The Concord Club usually meets monthly at their Club room above the Old Europe Restaurant, on Wisconsin Avenue, in Washington, DC.

The Washington Saengerbund is a member of the Deutscher Chorverband in Germany.

== Sources ==
- Pierce III, Frank H. (1981). The Washington Saengerbund - A History of German Song and German Culture in the Nation's Capital. LCCN 81011579. OCLC 7671878.
