= August Schoenborn =

American architect

August Gottlieb Schoenborn (October 20, 1827 – January 24, 1902) was a German American architect who helped design the United States Capitol dome.

== Life and career ==
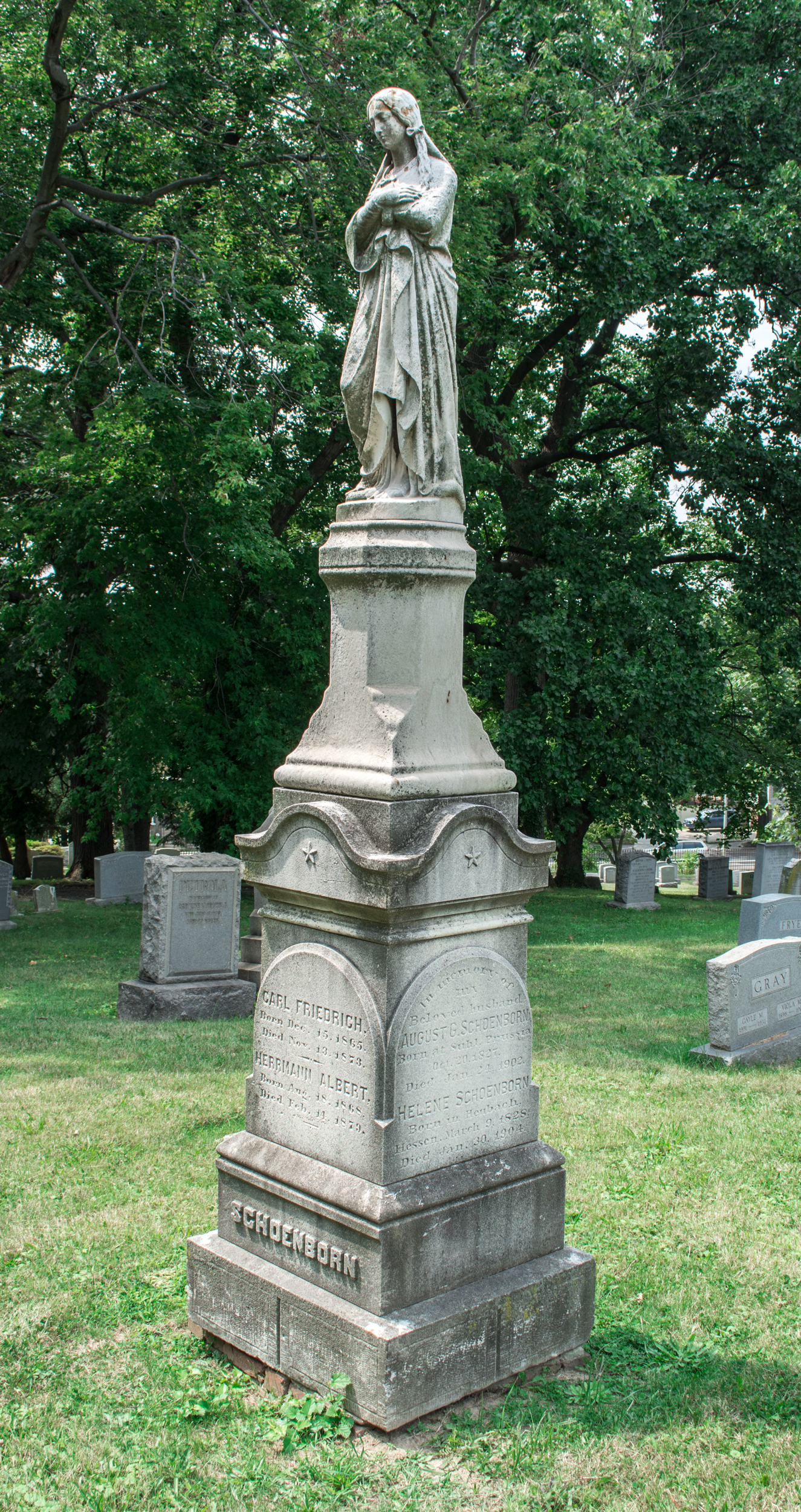
Grave of August Schoenborn at Prospect Hill Cemetery in Washington, D.C.

He was born in October 1827 in the town of Suhl, Germany, a major arms manufacturing center. He attended the city's public schools, and after graduation worked as a mechanic for three years. Schoenborn enrolled at the Technical Institute and School of Art (Kunst- und Bauhandwerksschule zu Erfurt) in 1843 in Erfurt, where he studied architecture. He emigrated to the United States in 1849 and settled in Wisconsin. Two years later, he moved to Washington, D.C.

In June 1851, he found a position as a draftsman under Thomas U. Walter, Architect of the Capitol. With only a small scale model and some very rough drawings to work from, Schoenborn produced highly detailed architectural plans. Walter did not initially believe that Schoenborn had done the work himself, but was quickly satisfied that Schoenborn was a trained architect. President Millard Fillmore was also highly impressed with Schoenborn's work, and often visited him in the architectural offices at the Capitol.

Schoenborn made two important contributions to the United States Capitol. When the Capitol library burned on December 24, 1851, it was replaced with an iron library which was designed by Schoenborn. Schoenborn also made the original drawings for the new iron dome of the Capitol.

When the American Civil War broke out in April 1861, Schoenborn worked as a surveyor and mapmaker for Union Army General Irvin McDowell in Virginia. He also drew numerous plans for barracks, hospitals, and offices for the Quartermaster General of the United States Army. He returned to work on the Capitol in May 1862.

== Personal life and death ==
Schoenborn spent the post-war years in Washington, D.C., designing numerous public buildings, for which he became very well known. He married Helene Schoenbrun, and had four daughters and two sons. His son William committed suicide on January 4, 1897.

He died at his home in Washington, D.C., on January 24, 1902, at the age of 74. A member of Concordia Lutheran Church, he was interred at Prospect Hill Cemetery in Washington, D.C.

== See also ==
- List of German Americans

== Bibliography ==
- Polmar, Brigette; Polmar, Norman (2010). Washington, D.C.'s Most Wanted: The Top 10 Book of Tourist Treasures, Powerful Politicians, and Capital Wonders. Washington, D.C.: Potomac Books. ISBN 9781597971508.
- Tom Fleischhauer: „August is my right hand...“ Wie der Thüringer Architekt August Gottlieb Schönborn (1827-1902) die Kuppel des Kapitols in Washington, D.C. entwarf. In: Mitteilungen des Vereins für die Geschichte und Altertumskunde von Erfurt, Bd. 76 (2015), S.198-219.
- August Gottlieb Schoenborn: Sketch of my Education and Connection with the Extension of the United States Capitol, Washington, D.C. In: Turpin C. Bannister: The Genealogy of the Dome of the United States Capitol (= Journal of the Society of Architectural Historians, Vol. 7, No. 1/2, 1948), S. 17-23.
