= Concordia German Evangelical Church and Rectory =

Historic church in Washington, D.C., United States

The United Church
- Concordia German Evangelical Church and Rectory
- Die Vereinigte Kirche
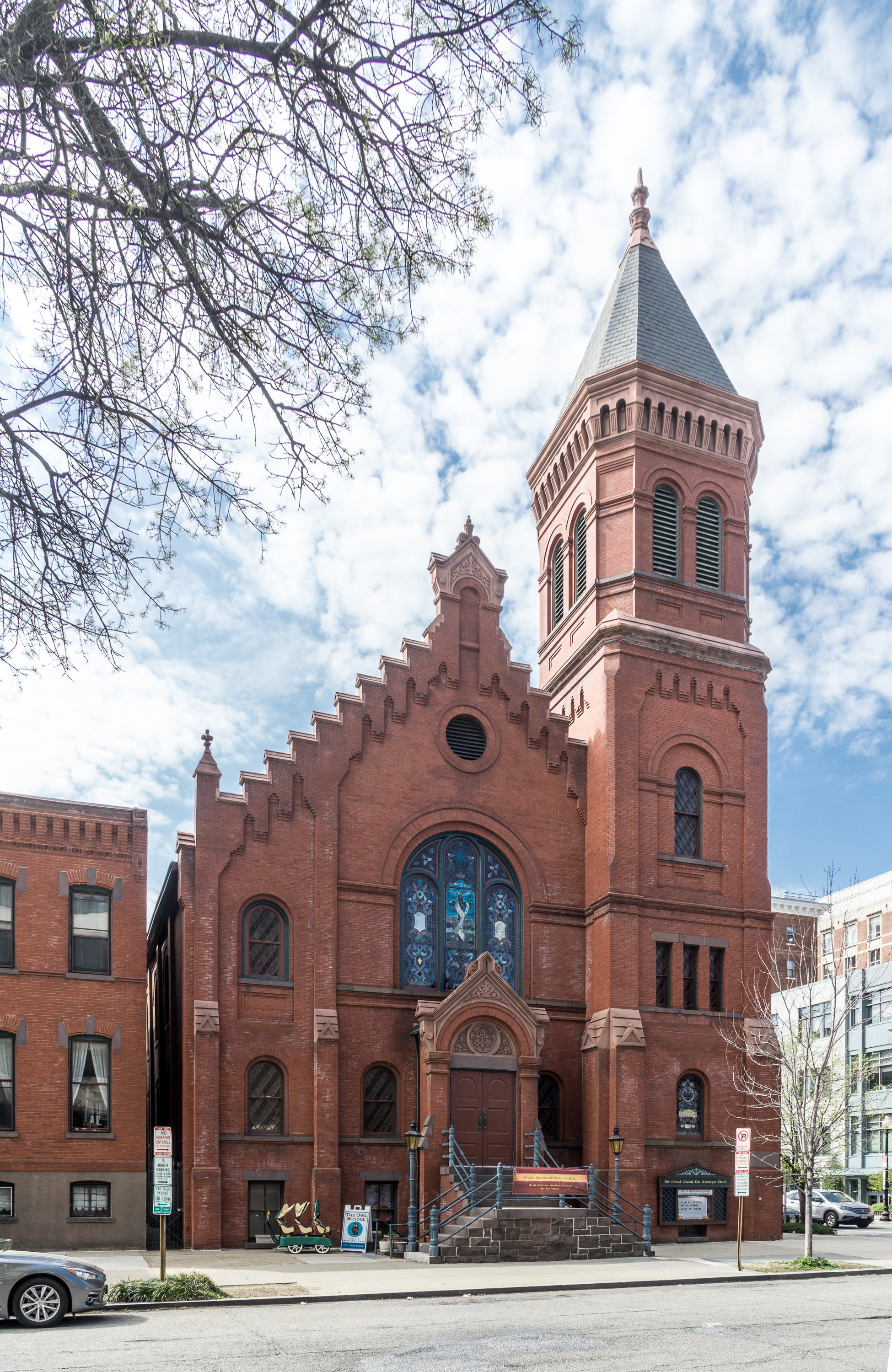
- The United Church
- Location: 1920 G St. NW; Washington, D.C.
- Country: United States
- Denomination: United Church of Christ; United Methodist Church
- Previous denomination: Lutheran Church

History
- Status: Church

Architecture
- Functional status: Active
- Heritage designation: NRHP
- Designated: 1978
- Architect(s): Paul Schulze; Albert Goenner
- Style: Gothic, Italianate
- Years built: 1833; 1932 (rebuilt)
- Concordia German Evangelical Church and Rectory
- U.S. National Register of Historic Places
- Location within Central Washington, D.C. Location within the District of Columbia Location within the United States
- Location: 20th and G Sts., Northwest, Washington, D.C.
- Coordinates: 38°53′52″N 77°2′42″W
- Area: 0.3 acres (0.12 ha)
- Built: originally in 1833; erected 1885; rebuilt in 1932
- Architect: Schulze, Paul; Goenner, Albert
- Architectural style: Gothic, Italianate
- NRHP reference No.: 78003055
- Added to NRHP: December 14, 1978

Concordia German Evangelical Church and Rectory, also known as Concordia United Church of Christ and Rectory, is a historic church in Northwest, Washington, D.C. Concordia Church has been located in Foggy Bottom on the corner of G and 20th streets since 1833. The parsonage was built in 1885. The church building, located directly west of the parsonage, was dedicated May 15, 1892, and remains mostly in its original state. To the rear of the church, on its southern end, a three-bay Sunday School was added in 1899 and reconstructed in 1932. Founded as Concordia German Evangelical United Church, the congregation is now known as The United Church. It is a member congregation of the United Church of Christ and the United Methodist Church. It continues to offer German language services and events today, as well as in English.

It is significant both historically and architecturally. The two buildings stand on a site that was in continuous ownership of the German congregation that built them since the late eighteenth century when the area was known as Funkstown or Hamburg, an early settlement that predated the founding of Washington. The church design is an example of late-nineteenth-century eclectic Victorian architecture.

Its current building was built in 1885–1891 and added to the National Register of Historic Places in 1978.

== Early years ==
Sixty Germans who were living in Washington City and Georgetown held a meeting on January 17, 1833, that resulted in the founding of a German Lutheran church. It was not until later that month or in early February that the group agreed upon an official name for their congregation: Concordia German Church. Once the name was decided, J. J. Lehmanhowsky contributed to the founding of the church by writing the church constitution. Later, he would become the first president of the church. Shortly after the name was decided on, talk began concerning the construction of a building for their purposes. The new congregation reached out to both first generation German immigrants and their German American descendants for the financial support needed to fund the construction. Once the funds were beginning to be secured, the next logical step for the congregation was to decide on a location for the building. As luck would have it, the city was already waiting for two German churches.

When Washington City was in its formative years, and while Georgetown was being touted as an up-and-coming area, Jacob Funk (sometimes spelled Funck), a German American, had purchased 130 acres (53 ha) of land next to Georgetown in hopes of creating an active German community. The area was commonly referred to as Hamburg and, despite Funk's best efforts, many plots of land remained untouched in the 1800s. In 1768, the German Lutherans and the German Presbyterians (also known as the Reformed) each bought a plot of land from Funk for five pounds sterling. By the time the Concordia German Church began looking for their church's location neither of those two plots had seen any use, and Concordia German Church ended up securing the plot that was originally intended for the Lutheran church for their building as well as buying the plot intended for the Reformed church. One of Funk's daughters would later unsuccessfully make an attempt to legally challenge the transaction. On August 20, 1833, the Masons of the area laid the cornerstone of the building at the corner of present-day G Street NW and 20th Street NW.

== 1850–1880 ==
Concordia German Church, like Washington City itself, experienced significant growth throughout the mid-1800s. In 1850, the church's property was valued at $3,000, but in just ten years the value more than tripled to $10,000. Also in that time period, the church completed a renovation of the building's gymnasium, which increased the number of people it could hold from 500 to 800.

The first record of Concordia German Evangelical Church in the Boyd City Directories appeared in 1850. In that edition, the listing is "Church, Lutheran, German, s side G n, cor 20 w". All the churches were listed in this fashion with no other information. The name listed and how the location was represented changed in the 1853 directory. "Church, Deutsche Evanglische Kirshe, s side G n, btw 19 and 20 w" was how people would find Concordia Church. The church could have changed the name to being listed in German to attract only those who could speak the language, considering all services were conducted in German until the early twentieth century. The understanding that each immigrant group stuck together influences this insight. One account illustrates this concept by stating, "The Germans traded only with the Germans." In 1862 and 1864, information began to be added to the directory. Instead of lists of churches, they were split into categories based on denomination. Concordia was always listed under Lutheran. The directory read "German Evangelical, G north cor. 20th West. Founded 1833. Pastor, Rev. Samuel Finckel. Sexton, George Jacobs." The directory also gave the home addresses of the pastor and sexton. Information was then removed from the directory over the next decade. There was no longer a listing for the sexton and the home address of the pastor was removed. The time of services was added however. The directories in 1870, 1872, and 1873 read (under Lutheran) "German Evangelical, G cor. 20th nw. Rev. Rietz, pastor. Services at 11 a.m."

In 1850, only two Lutheran churches existed in Washington City, and they were collectively worth $15,000. Concordia's property, located in the first ward of the District of Columbia was worth $3,000 that same year, and the second church, located in the second ward, was worth $12,000. However, with the growth of the city's economy and population came an increase in value for the church. By 1860, its property was evaluated at $10,000, and one additional Lutheran church was built in the District of Columbia. In 1870, U.S. Census data recorded that ten Lutheran churches had been established in D.C., but social statistics reports from the same year record only nine, with their total property valuation at $218,000. This exponential growth in Lutheran churches and property values sheds light on the influx of inhabitants in the city during this era. German immigrants continued to pour into Washington, D.C. In 1870, 4,131 German immigrants were recorded in the city, and by 1880, that number had increased to 5,016 German-native inhabitants.

In 1855, the growth of the congregation became apparent in the church cemetery. An association called "The Evangelical Society" realized that soon all the plots were going to be sold in the church's cemetery located between G and H and 4th and 5th Streets Northeast. Instead of waiting for a meeting to be held to decide the issue, the society purchased new land on what is present day Prospect Hill Cemetery. It fixed the problem, but because of their rash decision, they became the cemetery organization.

The increase of members in the congregation allowed the church to become more financially stable. Reverend Samuel D. Finckel, who came to the church in 1847, saw these changes. During his 23 years as pastor, especially in the 1860s, the church began donating to an orphanage located on 14th Street NW. This was the first signs of the change of focus to the community. Reverend Gustav Rietz continued this trend. During his pastorate from 1870 to 1879, he reorganized the Sunday school to cater to the congregation better and founded the Ladies Aid Society. Reverend Martin Kratt, who came in 1879, also assisted the community when he helped found the German Orphan Home. The establishment of the orphan home took place on Sunday, September 7, 1879. The church, Sunday school, and Ladies Aid Society all supported this orphanage in some way over the years. This can be seen in the Annual Report of the German Orphan Asylum of the District of Columbia for the year 1888. Although this is for its ninth year of existence, in the back it lists that Concordia Sunday School donated five dollars which they used to purchase four gallons of ice cream and two barrels of breads and cake. Towards the front, there is a whole page dedicated to the Annual Report of the Ladies Aid Society. Some of the items that were donated included clothes, mattresses, pillows, food, and books. Because the orphanage was to assist the German immigrant population as a whole, Concordia German Evangelical Church gained support from other German immigrant associations in the area. The National Republican edition of November 3, 1879, contained an article on the German Bakers’ Benevolent Association. It briefly discussed the fundraising efforts to support the German Orphan Asylum.

During Finckel's pastorate, a building committee was established. Finances were well managed, and between the years of 1850 and 1860, Concordia underwent renovations. These expanded the building's maximum capacity from 500 to 800 to accommodate Concordia's growing membership. Prior to retiring, Finckel baptized a boy who would become one of America's brightest young military composers, John Philip Sousa, whose mother was of Bavarian origin.

== 1880 until now ==
In August 1891, the cornerstone of the church's new building was laid. It marked the end of an era and was a symbol of a new beginning. World War I brought unfavorable attitudes in the city, along with the rest of the country, towards Germans, German Americans, and all things German. As a result, the church had no choice but to halt services in German. They were resumed once the war was over.

In 1974, the church experienced a trial merger with two other churches, United Methodist Congregation and Western Presbyterian. Fearful of losing its identity, Western Presbyterian left the merger and Concordia ended up permanently merging with just the United Methodist Congregation. This merger was created through a three-fourths majority vote in both churches. The merged congregations chose the name The United Church.

Today, the church had a brick facade. Its architectural features include a looming tower, quoins, molding, and stained glass windows. On December 14, 1978, the second building was declared a historical site by the National Register of Historical Places. There is a memorial plaque on the church that mentions John Philip Sousa's baptism at the church.
