= George A. Parkhurst =

- Born: March 18, 1841; New York State
- Died: July 2, 1890 (aged 49); New York City
- Occupation(s): Actor, Civil Servant

George Augustus Parkhurst (March 18, 1841 – July 2, 1890) was an American stage actor who was one of the last surviving members of the company of actors present on the night of April 14, 1865, when John Wilkes Booth assassinated President Abraham Lincoln during their performance of Our American Cousin. Late in his life Parkhurst created the role of Hobbs in the 1888 American debut of Little Lord Fauntleroy.

When Booth shot President Lincoln, Parkhurst was onstage playing the part of a bailiff as a member of a stock company managed by the British actress Laura Keene. Parkhurst had planned to stop by Booth’s dressing room at Ford's Theatre that night to borrow a costume; an appointment that for different reasons both missed.

== Career ==
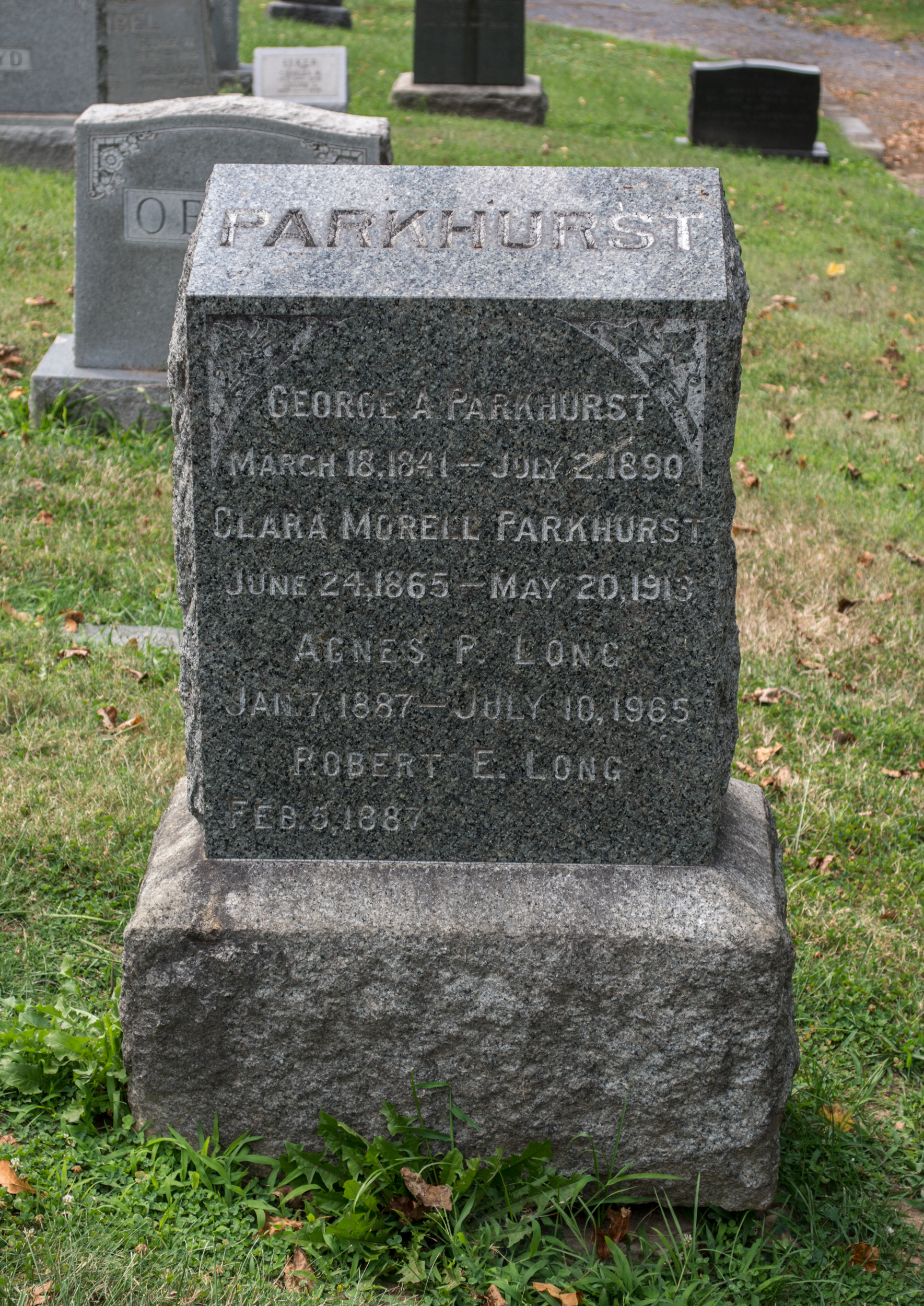
Grave of George Parkhurst at Prospect Hill Cemetery

George A. Parkhurst was born in New York State, son of Benjamin Parkhurst and Kezia Nason (source: George Parkhurst Increasings by Peter George Parkhurst, p. 232:) and may have been raised in Bergen, New Jersey, with his brother Benjamin. Parkhurst received some training for the stage from the actor Edwin Forrest. Eventually though, as a husband and father, he chose for the time to stay with his job as a postal clerk at the nation’s capitol. By the 1880s he apparently felt secure enough to become more active on stage and later found success playing Hobbs in the original American productions of Little Lord Fauntleroy. During this time Parkhurst had toured for several seasons with actress Maggie Mitchell's company in the play Fanchon, the Cricket, an adaptation of George Sand's La Petite Fadette by August Waldauer, and received critical acclaim for the role he was most proud of, Colonel Buzzy in a theatrical production of Amélie Rives' The Quick or the Dead.

== Death ==
Parkhurst died on July 2, 1890, at the age of forty-nine, after suffering a stroke at his New York residence. He was survived by his second wife Clara (née Morell; 1865–1913). Katherine "Kate" Parkhurst (1845–1881), his first wife, was the mother of his three children of which two, Benjamin and Bianca, survived to adulthood. Parkhurst was interred at Prospect Hill Cemetery, Washington, D.C.

== Lincoln's Death Bed ==
Some six months before his death Parkhurst made the claim in the press that on the afternoon of April 14, John Wilkes Booth visited an actor friend staying at Petersen House in Washington D.C. During his stay Booth's friend noticed that the actor seemed agitated and suggested that he lie down on his bed for a short rest, supposedly the same bed Abraham Lincoln died in just a few hours later. This revelation, that Parkhurst heard from an unnamed cast member of Our American Cousin, has never been verified.
