= Prospect Hill Cemetery (Washington, D.C.) =

Historic cemetery, a.k.a., German Cemetery

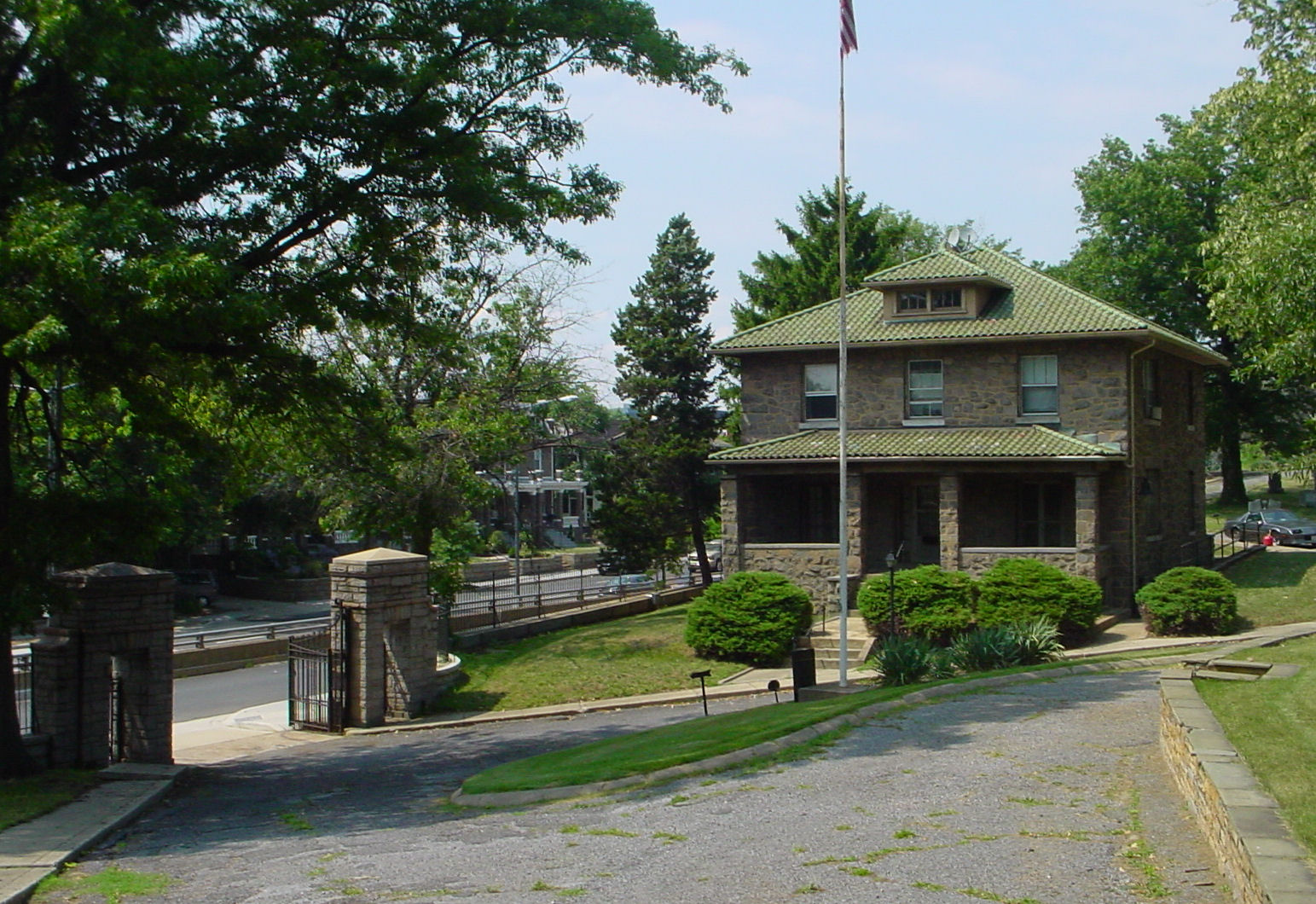
- Prospect Hill Cemetery Gatehouse
- Interactive map of Prospect Hill Cemetery

Details
- Established: 1858
- Location: Edgewood, Washington, D.C.
- Country: United States
- Coordinates: 38°55′09″N 77°00′28″W
- Type: Private, secular
- Owned by: Prospect Hill Cemetery, Inc.
- Size: 9 acres (36,000 m^{2})
- No. of graves: 14,000
- Website: Prospect Hill Cemetery official Web site
- Find a Grave: Prospect Hill Cemetery

Prospect Hill Cemetery, also known as the German Cemetery, is a historic German-American cemetery founded in 1858 and located at 2201 North Capitol Street in Washington, D.C. From 1886 to 1895, the Prospect Hill Cemetery board of directors battled a rival organization which illegally attempted to take title to the grounds and sell a portion of them as building lots. From 1886 to 1898, the cemetery also engaged in a struggle against the District of Columbia and the United States Congress, which wanted construct a main road (North Capitol Street) through the center of the cemetery. This led to the passage of an Act of Congress, the declaration of a federal law to be unconstitutional, the passage of a second Act of Congress, a second major court battle, and the declaration by the courts that the city's eminent domain procedures were unconstitutional. North Capitol Street was built, and the cemetery compensated fairly for its property.

In the 20th century, Prospect Hill Cemetery sold unneeded land, dismantled its chapel, and repositioned the cemetery's main entrance toward North Capitol Street and away from Lincoln Road NE. Established as a burying ground for members of the Lutheran faith, it gradually became a secular cemetery. Prospect Hill remains an active cemetery, and continues to accept burials.

== Founding of the cemetery and management issues ==
=== Founding the cemetery ===
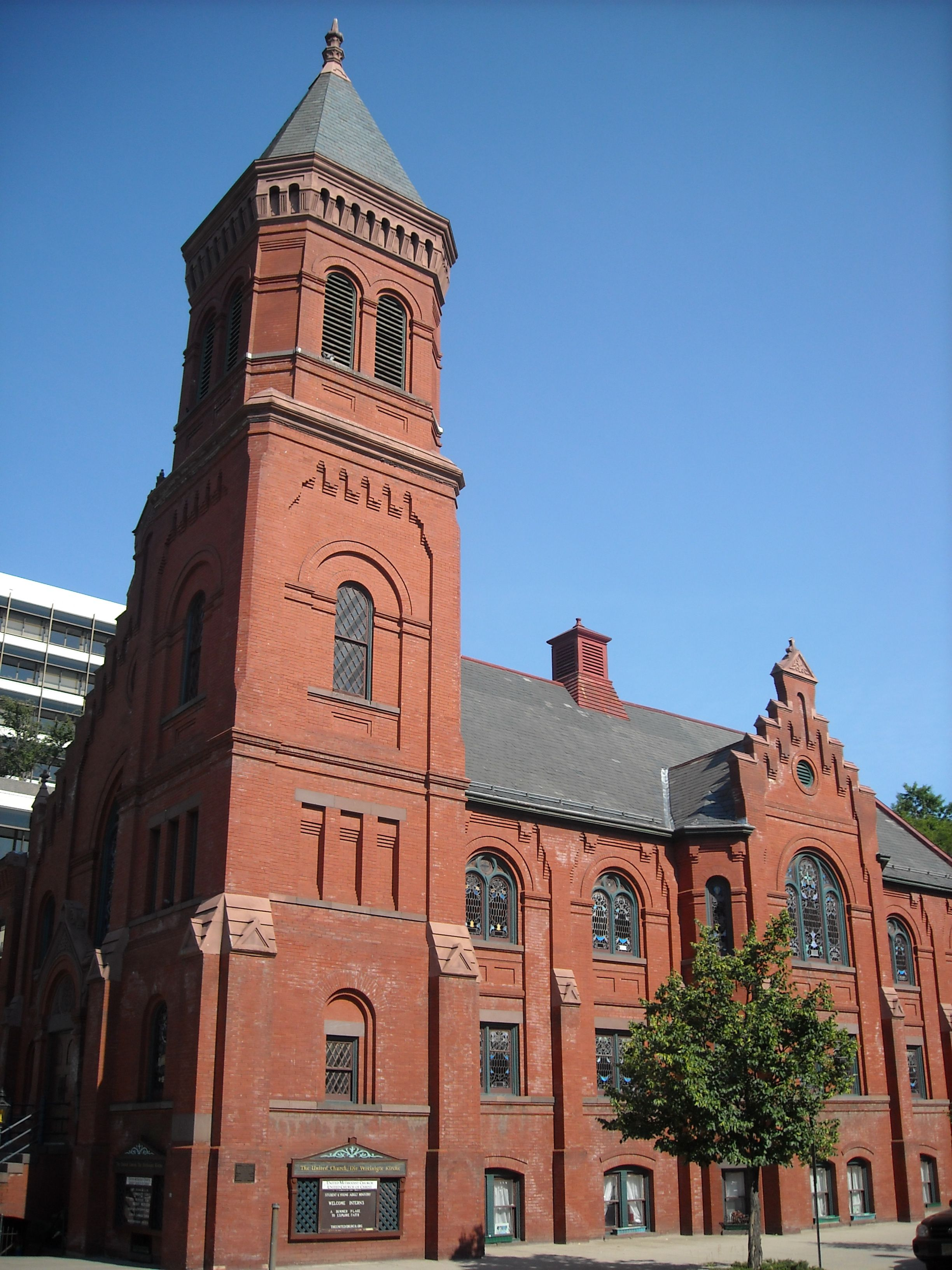
The German Evangelical Church Society of Concordia Church (pictured) bought and founded Prospect Hill Cemetery.

The German Evangelical Lutheran Church was organized by German immigrants to Washington, D.C., on January 27, 1833. The small Lutheran and Reformed congregation (Note: The church was unierte, a German word meaning "merged". Nominally Lutheran, the congregation was not doctrinally very strict and believed in Christian unity and worshipping with other Protestant faiths.) first worshipped at City Hall along with Catholics and Jews. In 1853, the Reformed and Lutheran elements of the congregation erected a church building at 20th and G Streets NW and changed the name of the congregation to Concordia Church. The growth in the church was due to the burgeoning German community in the city as well as the influence of Reverend Samuel D. Finkle (or Finckel), who assumed the pulpit on December 27, 1846. The church had a small burying ground adjacent to it. The congregants soon built a parsonage and parochial school, and established a German Evangelical Church Society in 1847 to assist with administration, fundraising, and other church affairs.

In 1858, the German Evangelical Church Society decided to purchase a cemetery for Concordia Church. The society bought a site, but then discovered that the title to it was not clear. A second site was then sought. Seventeen acres of Moore's Farm, located in the Glenwood neighborhood (now known as Edgewood), were purchased for $7,000 ($260,481 in 2025 dollars) on September 23, 1858. Title in the land was invested in two members of the German Evangelical Church Society, although the deed of transfer specified that the title should be transferred to an appropriate corporate organization once a charter was obtained from Congress (which, at that time, chartered corporations in the District of Columbia). (Note: Church and PHC records show that the title was vested in five men: Christopher Friess, Frederick Heider, Augustus E.L. Keese, John G. Stock, and John Walter.) The whites-only cemetery was dedicated on September 26, 1858, with a parade featuring a band and three German membership associations. Reverend Finkle, who led the ceremonies and blessed the grounds, declared the cemetery open to all classes and members of any religious sect.

=== Construction of the cemetery ===
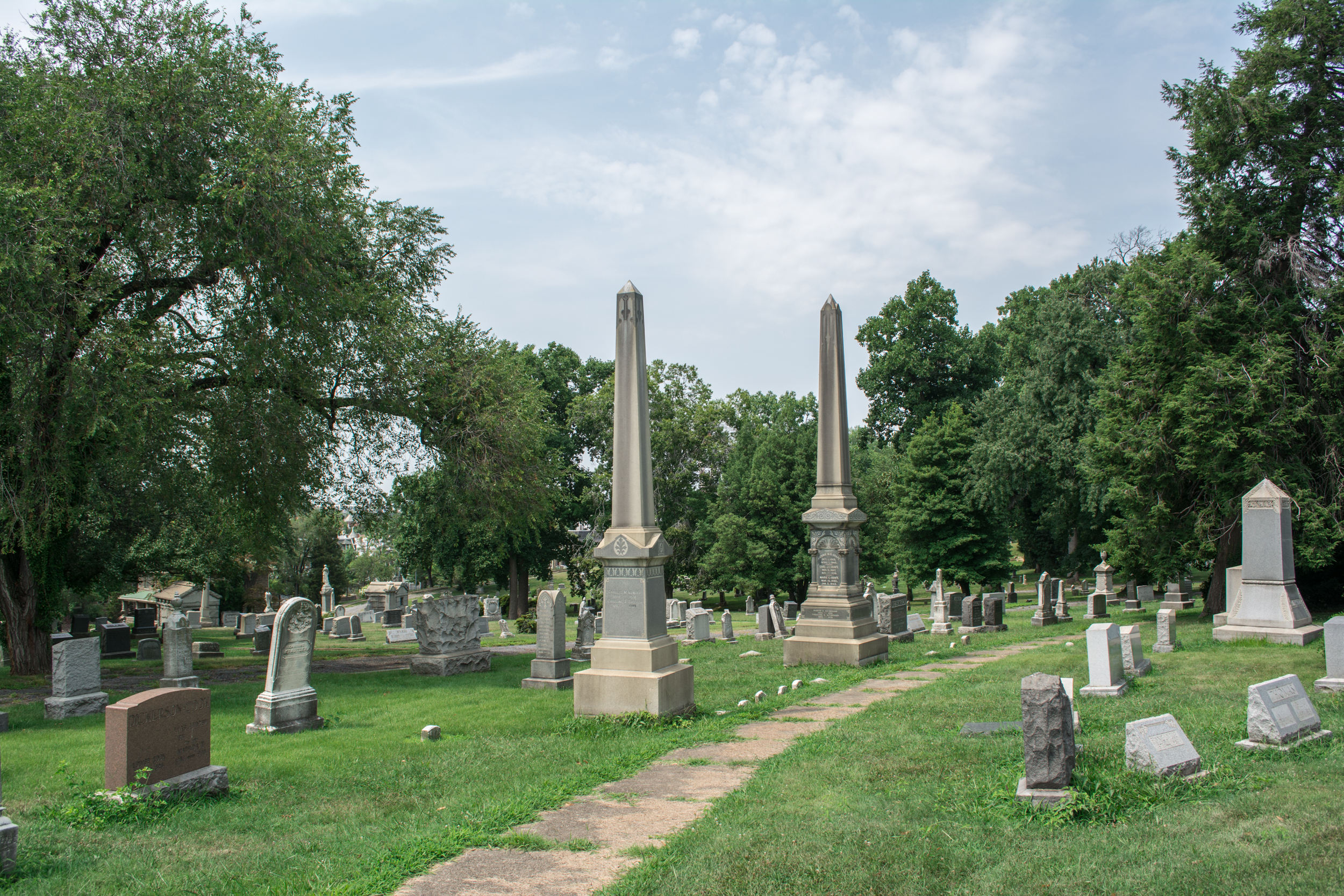
Curving paths, trees, and landscaping are typical of Prospect Hill Cemetery's "garden cemetery" design.

It is not clear why the cemetery was named Prospect Hill. The name was a common one for cemeteries in the mid-1800s, but the District of Columbia Preservation Review Board suggests that the name was probably inspired by the burying ground's location. Prospect Hill Cemetery is indeed on high ground, and it has excellent views of the United States Capitol and the adjacent neighborhoods of Eckington and Bloomingdale. (It also has a superb view of the Washington Monument, although the monument was not complete at the time the cemetery was founded.)

Prospect Hill was designed as a garden cemetery (also known as a rural cemetery). Until the early 1800s, most burying grounds (the word "cemetery" did not come into use in the United States until the 1840s) were next to churches. They were very overcrowded and unhealthy, with graves stacked upon each other or emptied and reused for new burials. As a reaction to the urban cemetery, the first "garden" cemetery—Père Lachaise Cemetery in Paris—opened in 1804. The concept quickly spread across Europe. Garden/rural cemeteries did not have to be outside the city limits. When land within a city could be found, the cemetery was enclosed with a wall to give it a garden-like quality. These cemeteries were often not sectarian, nor co-located with a house of worship. Inspired by the English landscape garden movement, they often looked like attractive parks. The first garden/rural cemetery in the United States was Mount Auburn Cemetery near Boston, Massachusetts, founded by the Massachusetts Horticultural Society in 1831. It was followed by Laurel Hill Cemetery in Philadelphia in 1836, and Green-Wood Cemetery in Brooklyn in 1838. Prospect Hill was designed as a typical garden cemetery, with winding roads and paths, a high stone wall, and (in time) many trees and bushes. Its main entrance was on Lincoln Road. The cemetery's most prominent feature was an ellipse, bounded on the outer edge by a road and featuring two paths: one an inner, oval path paralleling the road and the other a straight, cruciform path. The ellipse was aligned with Lincoln Road, and most burials here faced east. The District of Columbia Preservation Review Board has described the layout of the cemetery as "characteristic and a relatively early example of the garden cemeteries created in the United States beginning in the 1830s". According to the Historic American Landscapes Survey, Prospect Hill Cemetery, along with Glenwood Cemetery (1854) and Mount Olivet Cemetery (1858), "changed the dynamics of cemeteries in the city" by setting a new standard for cemetery design and layout.

Initially, Prospect Hill Cemetery featured two structures, a small farmhouse (used as the resident superintendent's house) and a barn. Both predated the establishment of the cemetery. In 1873, a gatehouse designed by August Schoenborn, a noted German-American architect who lived in the city, was built near the main gate on Lincoln Road.

Most of the early burials at Prospect Hill were reinterments of remains from the Concordia Church cemetery. A marker inscribed with a death date of 1844 represents the oldest burial at the cemetery, but is a reinterment. Many of the mausolea and markers reflect the styles of adjacent Glenwood Cemetery, established in 1854. The earliest mausolea are the Abner and Baumann structures, which are in the northern part of the cemetery on the slope facing the North Capitol Street gate.

=== The 1860 charter ===
On June 13, 1860, Congress approved a corporate charter for the Prospect Hill Cemetery corporation (PHC). The legislation named eight members of the German Evangelical Church Society as incorporators of "Prospect Hill Cemetery": Christopher Friess, John Guttensohn, Friedrich "Fred" Heider, Augustus E.L. Keese, B. Ostermeyer, George Schultz, John G. Stork, and John Walter. The charter allowed PHC to hold up to 100 acres (400,000 m^{2}) but not less than 17 acres (69,000 m^{2}) of contiguous land as a cemetery in perpetuity. Section 3 of the charter specifically forbade the construction of any new street, alley, or canal through the property. The new corporation was to be led by a president, secretary, and six directors, who were to be elected annually by majority vote of the shareholders. The shareholders included the eight incorporators and each lotholder (who received a single vote, no matter how large their lot). The board of directors had the ability to appoint individuals to vacancies between elections.

== Management struggles and the 1886 charter amendment ==
Management of Prospect Hill Cemetery was haphazard in its early years. Only seven directors (which included the president and secretary) were elected rather than the required eight, and the real decision maker governing the burial ground was the German Evangelical Church Society (which changed its name numerous times during the next 30 years). Furthermore, title to the cemetery was not immediately conveyed to the new corporation, as required by the deed of transfer. (Transfer did not occur until June 10, 1873.) Fundraisers to benefit the cemetery were held in June 1865 and May 1866.

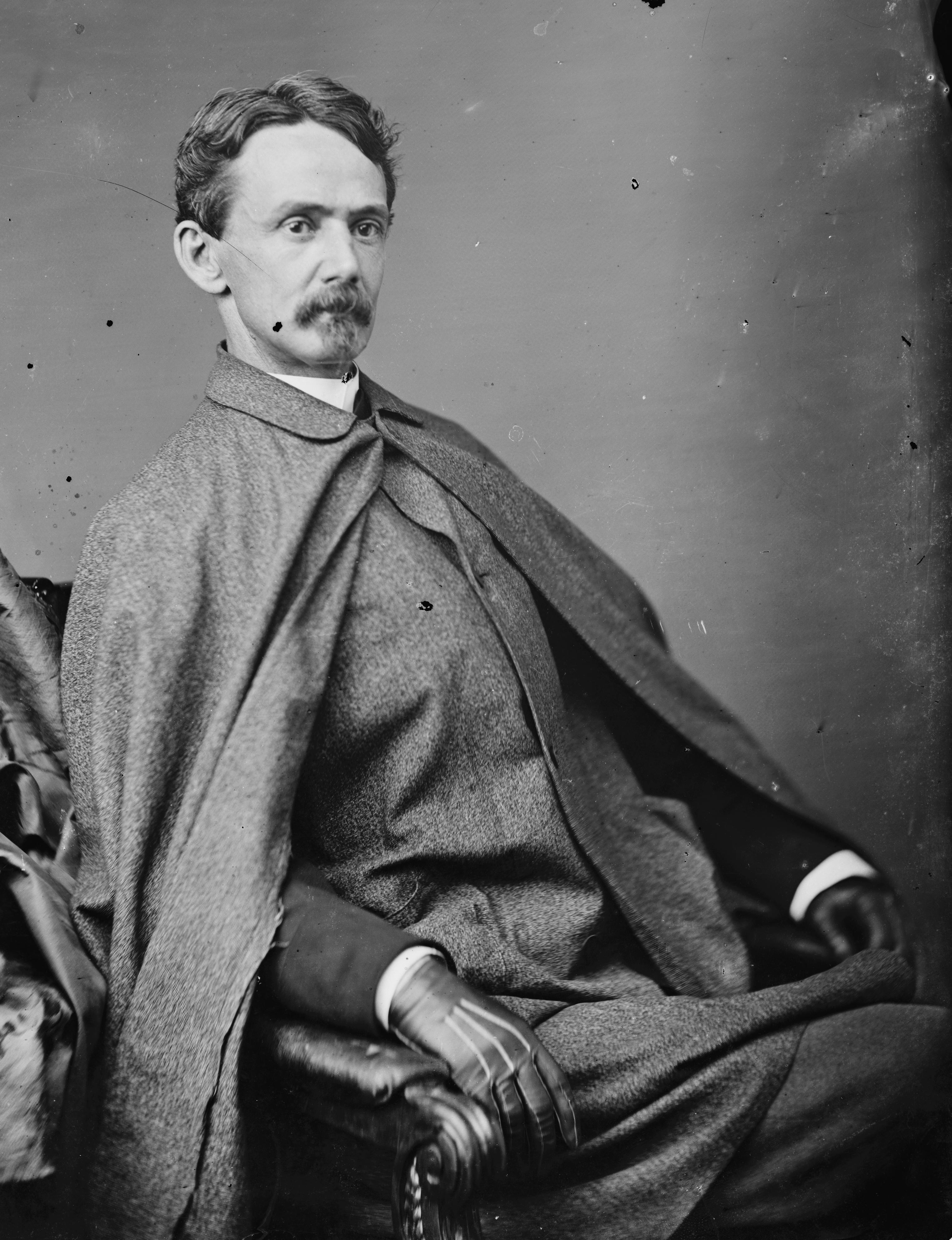
Senator John James Ingalls sponsored the legislation that amended the cemetery's charter in 1886.

In 1867, PHC reported that it received income of $1,500 ($34,554 in 2025 dollars) in the past six months, expended $500 in improvements and repairs, and was in excellent financial condition. The board elected that year included August Meiners, president; John Vogt, vice president; Frederick Schweiring, secretary; Michael Langman, treasurer; and Christopher Freiss, F. Haiden, Christopher Just, H. Kaiser, John Killian, and August Lipold. By 1870, however, the cemetery faced a problem: A significant number of individuals had purchased lots but failed to pay. Beginning on February 9, 1870, PHC announced that lotholders in arrears must complete payment by June 30, or the cemetery would seize their lot and sell to it to someone else. Nearly all lot sales in the past had been to members of the German Evangelical Church Society, but now sales to non-members, including many who were neither German nor Lutheran, expanded rapidly. Throughout most of the 1870s, the cemetery's superintendent was Christopher Buechler.

Internal struggles at PHC began in the late 1870s, and culminated in 1885. The issue was that Concordia Church and the German Evangelical Church Society controlled the cemetery association, even though few members owned lots. Other lotholders were denied the right to vote at annual meetings, and many suspected that cemetery income was being diverted to church use. These "independent" lotholders marshaled sufficient votes in 1884 to force the appointment of a committee to study the issue and make recommendations to the lotholders the following year. (Note: The committee consisted of Hugo G. Eichholtz, A.L. Geiser, John A. Griesbauer, I. Karr, August Schmedtie, George Wagner, and Dr. John Walter.) The committee failed to report in February 1885, and a resolution was adopted by the lotholders to force it to make a report and recommendations in 1886. In March 1885, an agreement was reached in which Concordia Church and the German Evangelical Church Society conceded that the independent lotholders had the right to vote.

Implementing the agreement required a change to the charter, however. Independent lotholder Simon Wolf successfully petitioned Senator John James Ingalls (R-Kansas) to introduce legislation in the 49th United States Congress to amend the PHC charter to reaffirm the rights of lotholders. The bill was favorably reported out of the Senate Committee on the District of Columbia on March 30, and passed the full Senate on June 17. The legislation (S. 1187) amended the cemetery's charter so that the cemetery corporation was not permitted to hold more than 18 acres (73,000 m^{2}) and not less than 15 acres (61,000 m^{2}), and affirmed that the core 15 acres (61,000 m^{2}) of the cemetery could never be sold or used for any purpose other than a burial ground. The bill also affirmed the right of all lotholders (not just those associated with Concordia Church or the German Evangelical Church Society) to vote at annual meetings and hold office, provided new rules for managing the annual meeting and casting votes, directed the cemetery to use its income solely for the benefit of the burying ground, and expanded the board of directors to nine directors (each of which had to be elected annually by a majority of lotholders). Although the Commissioners of the District of Columbia (Note: Beginning in 1874, the District of Columbia was run by three commissioners, two of which were appointed by the President of the United States with the approval of the Senate and a third member who was selected by the United States Army Corps of Engineers (and who had oversight over the city's public works). One of the civilian members was chosen to act as president of the city commission.) initially did not oppose the bill, on June 26 they asked the Senate to table the bill and decline to send it to the United States House of Representatives for action. The city was contemplating extending North Capitol Street past Boundary Avenue (now Florida Avenue) to the United States Soldiers' Home (about double its existing length), and the provision of the bill which prevented use of the Prospect Hill Cemetery grounds for any purpose other than a cemetery interfered with the street's proposed route. The Senate, however, did not table the bill and the House approved it unaltered.

In elections held after the charter amendment, five of the board members belonged to the German Evangelical Church Society and three to independent lotholders.

== Fight for control of the cemetery ==
The City Commissioners, however, were undeterred in their desire to extend North Capitol Street. Although they knew federal law prohibited the use of cemetery land, on November 5, 1886, the commissioners claimed to have contacted the lotholders, a large majority of whom were said to favor the donation of cemetery land for the road. The commissioners had city legal counsel study whether they could condemn the land and accept it as a donation (as Congress had appropriated no money for the city to pay for the property). The city's chief attorney, Albert G. Riddle, reported that federal law barred the city from condemning the property. The only alternatives were for every single lotholder to give their approval for a donation of land or for the city to ask Congress to revise the corporation's charter. With neither option likely to happen, Commissioners William B. Webb and Samuel E. Wheatley agreed to cancel the extension of North Capitol Street.

=== Founding of a competing corporation ===
Control over Prospect Hill Cemetery began to be contested in December 1886. Dissatisfaction with the 1885 agreement grew among members of the German Evangelical Church Society (now known as the German Evangelical Society), many of whom supported the extension of North Capitol Street. This group subsequently decided to seize control of the cemetery. They incorporated a "German Evangelical Society of Prospect Hill Cemetery" (GESPHC) on December 16, 1986, (Note: The documents for incorporation were filed by George F. Schaffer, president; William Scherger, treasurer; Sebastian Toepfer, secretary; and Fred Heider, Louis Kettler, and George C. Walker, directors.) and the following day met with trustees John Walter and Frederick Heider of Prospect Hill Cemetery. Walker and Heider conveyed title to the cemetery to the GESPHC that same day. On March 17, 1887, the GESPHC filed a plan with the city to subdivide the cemetery. The 7 acres (28,000 m^{2}) west of the proposed North Capitol Street route was severed from the cemetery, and the GESPHC further subdivided this section into building lots. This not only subjected these 7 acres (28,000 m^{2}) to taxation, but allegedly made it legal for the city to condemn the route through it needed to extend North Capitol Street. With no burials having been made in plots which could be condemned by the city, the GESPHC trustees believed that the subdivision cleared the way for the city to build the street. (More than 4,000 burials had occurred east of the planned street.)

Despite these actions, the city did not act on the North Capitol Street extension until the end of the year. In the fall of 1887, the city proposed taking a 130-foot (40 m) wide strip of land through the cemetery to extend North Capitol Street. (Note: The process for extending city streets required that the commissioners advertise their intent, hold a hearing at which landholders could voice their views or objections, and then formally approve a street or extension.) The city's hearing on the extension occurred on November 11, 1887, and PHC directors Fred Heider, H. Lereker, William Scherzer, Sebastian Toepfer, and George C. Walker attended the hearing. There were no objections raised to the route or extension. There were, however, local landowners who did not approve of the street extension. On December 14, Mrs. Annie E. Barbour, whose 2.9 acres (12,000 m^{2}) of property lay adjacent to the south side of the cemetery, filed suit against the city—arguing that the city commissioners did not have the funds to pay for her land, and that the city intended to take her property without due process or compensation. Alarmed that the city was ignoring federal law barring the construction of roads through their property, PHC also filed for an injunction to stop the city from taking action. PHC claimed it had not voiced opposition to the road extension because it assumed the commissioners knew an act of Congress prevented the road from going through cemetery land. It also pointed out that three burial plots had already been sold on the west side of the planned route.

The superior court granted the PHC's injunction on December 17.

=== Desecration of the cemetery and aftermath ===
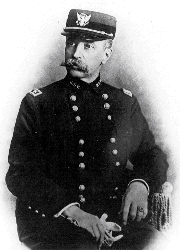
Colonel William Ludlow, who gave the orders to have trees chopped down at the cemetery despite a court order protecting the grounds.

On December 14, City Engineer Commissioner Colonel William Ludlow issued verbal orders to George M. Beale, D.C. superintendent of roads, to begin work on extending North Capitol Street. Three days later, the D.C. Superior Court issued an injunction stopping all work on the road. Although subsequent events are unclear, later congressional testimony suggested that the injunction was served only on Commissioner Webb, not all three commissioners. Webb may have referred the injunction to the District's assistant counsel, H.E. Davis, but neither individual informed Ludlow. On December 23, seven workmen entered the cemetery and tore down fences, chopped down 12 trees, and uprooted shrubs. The cemetery superintendent, Henry Winckelman, attempted to stop them but was unable to do so. Davis allegedly told Ludlow of the injunction late in the afternoon on December 23, and Ludlow verbally told Beale to stop work a few hours later. Officers of the PHC complained to city officials, and on December 29 Commissioner Wheatley issued a written order to Beale to stop work.

After the city's desecration of the cemetery, independent directors on the PHC board learned of the formation of the GESPHC and the transfer of the cemetery's title by the other board members. They were outraged. Independent board member John Vogt asserted that the trustees had no authority to file for a subdivision, and that lotholders were almost unanimous in opposing the transfer of title. At a special meeting of the Prospect Hill Cemetery lotholders held on January 5, 1888, the 400 lotholders present elected a new president (Charles A. Bickwedde) and a new secretary (Leonhardt Eckert). With title to the cemetery in question, lots could not be sold and income plummeted. A financial committee, consisting of members Jacob J. Appich, W. Grisbauer, (Note: This may be John A. Griesbauer.) Charles Groff, Frederick Reh, and Charles Schneider, was established to support the cemetery. It immediately raised $500.50 ($17,935 in 2025 dollars) in donations. A second committee, consisting of members William Dietz, Jacob Rupid, Charles Schneider, L.H. Schneider, August Schmedtie, and George Wagner, was appointed to provide support and advice to the board of directors. A committee on resolutions was also formed, consisting of members Frederick Imhoff, L.H. Schneider, and George Wagner. At the end of the special meeting, the committee on resolutions reported out a series of resolutions denouncing the city's desecration of the cemetery; declaring the city's action illegal and taken in support of a real estate syndicate which sought to profit from the street extension; asking the PHC board of directors to sue the city commissioners civilly and criminally; and establishing a committee to meet with House and Senate District Committees, the President of the United States, and the city commissioners to inform them of the events of the past two years. L.H. Schneider successfully amended one resolution to denounce the six men who filed incorporated the GESPHC and subdivided the cemetery. Each resolution passed overwhelmingly.

The board of directors of the PHC filed suit against GESPHC, John Walter, and Frederick Heider on January 25, 1888. They accused the organization and two men of seeking to seize the cemetery's revenues, conflicts of interest, illegally transferring title to the cemetery, and illegally subdividing the cemetery. The GESPHC countersued, arguing that the PHC had never been duly organized under the charter of 1860. Even if it had, the GESPHC said, the PHC's actions were tainted and irregular due to the voting rights given to individuals who were not members of the German Evangelical Society.

=== Congressional investigation ===
Within days of the PHC lotholders' special meeting, Representative John J. Hemphill (D-South Carolina) introduced a resolution to have the House Committee on the District of Columbia investigate the matter and report to Congress any attempts to violate federal law. The resolution was favorably reported out of the House Committee on the District of Columbia, and adopted by the full House. A special subcommittee of the District of Columbia Committee was established to oversee the investigation.

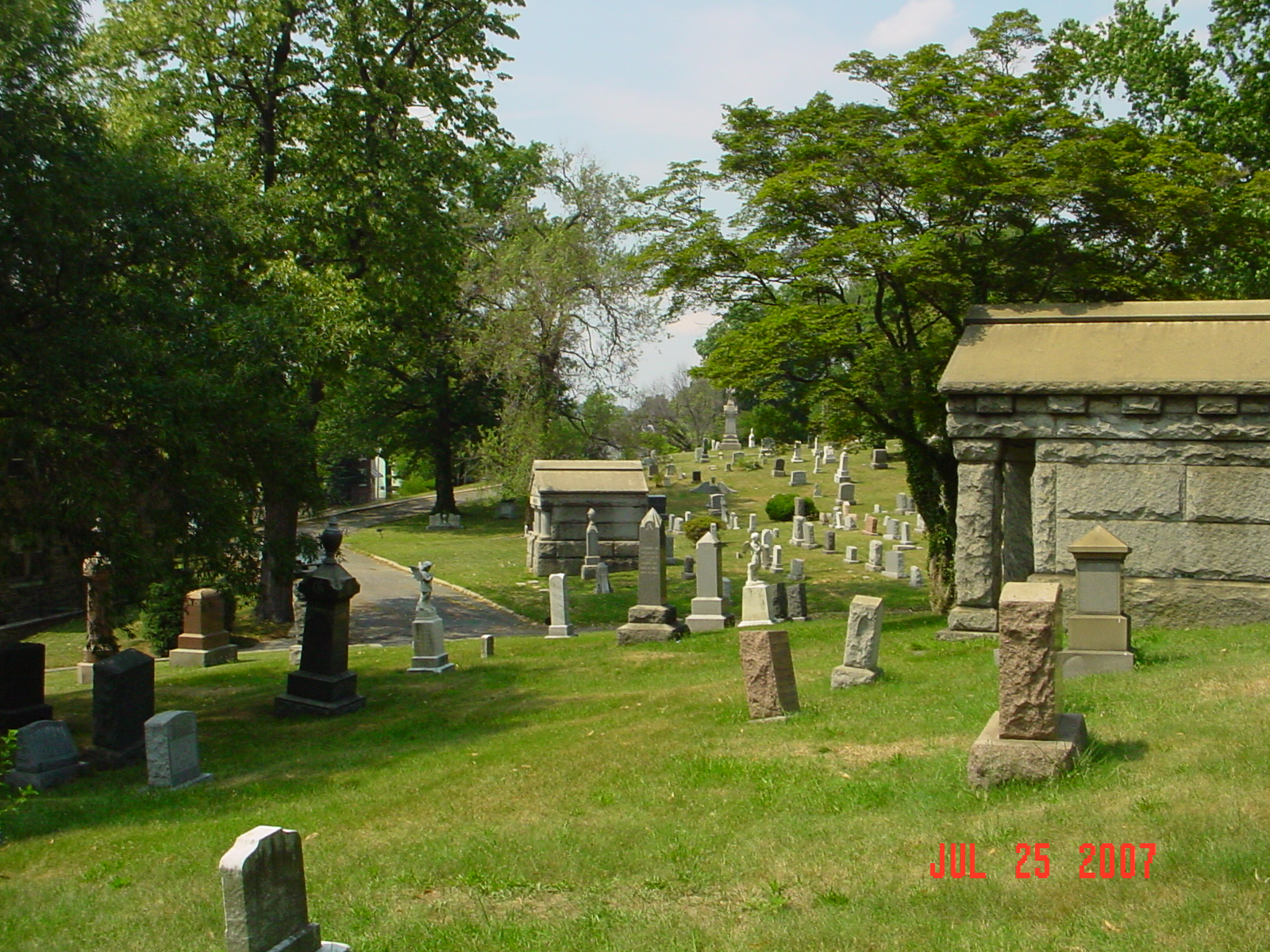
Prospect Hill graves.

The special subcommittee met for the first time on March 3, 1888, and heard testimony in the matter its first day. PHC director L.H. Schneider testified about the organization's 1860 charter, the 1886 amendments to the charter, and Section 3's bar against the construction of roads in the cemetery. Schneider also testified that the city commissioners were well aware of Section 3's prohibition on new roads. City Commissioner Webb reviewed for the subcommittee the city's initial attempt to extend North Capitol Street in late 1886. He noted that the commissioners did not approve construction at that time, as federal law appeared to bar it. Webb claimed that the GESPHC approached the city with news of the subdivision and their willingness to allow the city to cut the road. The city commissioners told the GESPHC that the organization had no authority to subdivide the cemetery or donate any burial ground, and that the city commissioners had never approved the street's extension. Webb claimed that Colonel Ludlow had illegally issued orders sending work crews into the cemetery. Superintendent of Roads Beale testified that Colonel Ludlow verbally ordered him to begin work on December 14, that no countermanding order was ever received, and that work began on the cemetery grounds on December 23. The work ceased at the end of that day when Ludlow phoned to tell him to stop. Beale also told the subcommittee that it was not until December 29 that Commissioner Wheatley issued a written order to stop work.

The special subcommittee heard from Colonel Ludlow on March 9. Ludlow flatly contradicted Commissioner Webb, and produced documentation showing that the three commissioners had formally taken action in early December to approve the road extension. Although Webb claimed he verbally informed Ludlow about the injunction the day it was issued, Ludlow denied knowing about it until Davis verbally informed him of its existence on December 23. When asked why the city commissioners took action despite clear congressional instructions prohibiting road-building on Prospect Hill Cemetery's land, Ludlow said that the actions of the GESPHC seemed to dispose of that bar. Simon Wolf, who petitioned Congress to make the 1886 charter amendments, testified that a man claiming to be from a "Philadelphia real estate syndicate" approached him at the U.S. Capitol, threatened him, and told him to not seek the charter amendments. Ludlow, however, categorically denied knowledge of any such syndicate. George Schaffer testified last, admitting that he prepared the paperwork creating the subdivision just prior to the end of his term as PHC president, and that such filings were properly undertaken under his authority as president. Unable to determine which faction truly represented the PHC, and not wishing to interfere in the court proceedings then ongoing, the subcommittee took no more testimony.

A report was ready to be presented to the full House District Committee on April 3, 1888. The report absolved the city commissioners of any wrongdoing, and refused to take a side in the litigation. But a quorum of subcommittee members did not exist, and the report was not presented. A quorum was reached on April 6. But no vote to accept the report was taken, as there were concerns as to whether the December 17 injunction had been properly served on the commissioners. This legal question was resolved, and on April 20 the full committee voted to accept the report. No further action was taken, however.

=== Court proceedings ===
Dueling boards of directors were elected by the PHC and the GESPHC in March 1988, but the Court of the District of Columbia in Equity enjoined the GESPHC from taking any action regarding the property, income, or title of Prospect Hill Cemetery. The PHC continued to elect a board of directors, however, in 1889, 1890, 1891, 1892, and 1893.

After nearly four years of court hearings, testimony, and motions, the Court of the District of Columbia in Equity found in favor of the PHC on November 22, 1892. It declared the transfer of title in December 1886 illegal, and ordered the March 1886 subdivision filing dissolved. The court also dismissed the GESPHC's countersuit.

The German Evangelical Society appealed the decision to the Court of Appeals of the District of Columbia. It gave three grounds for appeal: 1) That the court in equity had erred in finding the PHC properly incorporated under the 1860 charter; 2) that the court in equity had erred in denying a November 17, 1892, motion to amend the countersuit; and 3) that the court in equity had erred when it found that non-members of the Society were voting members of the PHC. The Court of Appeals, however, dismissed the first and third grounds. Under the rules of the court, the Society (as appellant) was required to have printed the testimony and proceedings of the initial court. The Society had declined to do so, and the court of appeals concluded that it could not find in favor of the appellant without any printed record. The key question in answering the remaining issue, the court of appeals said, was whether the 1886 entity calling itself the "German Evangelical Society" was, in fact, the same voluntary, unincorporated body which formed the PHC in 1860. The court said it was not and could never be, since as a matter of law it was a completely new entity. The charter of 1860, as amended, gave no voting rights to any outside organization, only to lotholders. Nor did the charter require lotholders to be members of the German Evangelical Society, whether the society of 1860 or the newly incorporated body of 1886. The court in equity, then, was right in denying the November 17, 1892, motion to amend, for this motion would have given the 1886 body voting rights and standing in the PHC annual meeting. The Court of Appeals affirmed the judgment of the Court of the District of Columbia in Equity on February 5, 1894.

== Extension of North Capitol Street ==
=== Congressional activity, 1891 to 1893 ===
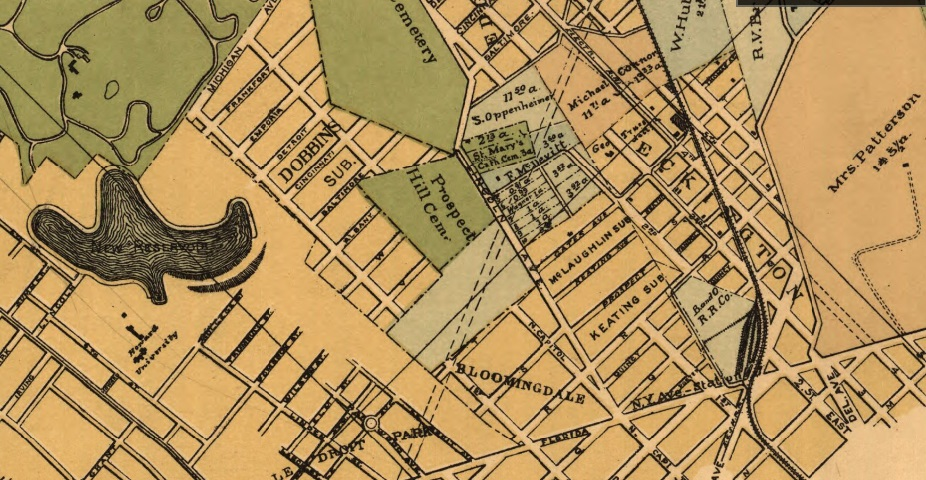
Map of the Edgewood neighborhood in 1890, showing Prospect Hill Cemetery and the completed portions of North Capitol Street (except those through the Barbour estate and cemetery).

The 51st United States Congress ran from March 4, 1889, to March 3, 1891. Regarding the extension of North Capitol Street, the key issue facing Congress was amending the Prospect Hill Cemetery charter to either allow the cemetery association to donate land to the city or permit the city to condemn the land. On April 22, 1890, the Senate added an amendment to the District of Columbia appropriations bill which would allow a land transfer. The House District of Columbia Committee favorably reported a standalone bill on April 24. The Senate refused to act on the standalone bill because the House had refused to act on the D.C. appropriations bill. To get movement on the legislation, the city commissioners held a hearing to generally discuss and consider street extensions throughout the city. PHC representative George Wagner accused the commissioners of trying to win public support for the North Capitol Street extension by cloaking it as a "general hearing", and the PHC board showed up in force at the hearing to protest the extension of North Capitol Street. No further action was taken on the bill in the remainder of the 51st Congress, and it died at the end of the session.

The 52nd United States Congress opened on December 7, 1891, and ended on March 3, 1893. Initially, no legislation was introduced in Congress. The commissioners of the District of Columbia tried to force the issue by holding hearings on the street extension issue on May 22, 1891. The PHC's attorney, Henry Wise Garnett, reminded the commissioners of the bar in federal law preventing any action, and the commissioners decided to wait until Congress acted. In the waning days of 1891, a new bill, S.1307, was introduced with substantially the same language as the 1890 bill. This bill was drawn up by the Washington Board of Trade (a business group). On January 25, the city commissioners held a hearing on the bill. George Wagner and August Schmedtie, representatives of the PHC, objected to any congressional action until the court ruled on which organization held title to the cemetery.

Congress, however, was not deterred. Two new bills, S.2637 and H.B.7407, were introduced in Congress in July 1892. Senator John Sherman (R-Ohio) authored the Senate legislation, which allowed the cemetery land to be condemned, the price of the condemnation to be paid from the United States Treasury, and the grading of the road to occur (although the construction cost was capped at $10,000). The House bill was substantially the same. The Senate passed a resolution asking the city to estimate the cost of construction for the street extension. Captain William Trent Rossell, the Engineer Commissioner, reported that the city needed 254,189 square feet (23,614.9 m^{2}) of land for the road, of which 126,789 square feet (11,779.1 m^{2}) belonged to the cemetery. Rossell estimated the value of the land at 30 cents per square foot, or $38,036.70 ($1,362,957 in 2025 dollars). Grading of the land would require another $69,286 ($2,482,748 in 2025 dollars). The PHC, for its part, was in good financial shape (despite sharply lower lot sales and interments due to the ongoing lawsuit). Many lotholders no longer felt the cemetery was in danger of being moved or wiped out, and there was some support for letting the road go through. A committee of three, led by director Charles Schneider, was appointed investigate the matter and report back to lotholders.

Meanwhile, condemnation proceeded against other property owners in the area. At this time, the eminent domain procedures governing the District of Columbia required the city to condemn land, and for the landowner to fight the condemnation in court before a jury. The jury then determined if the condemnation was required, and what compensation should be awarded the property owner. In two separate proceedings, juries found land to be worth just 1 cent per square foot. Senator James McMillan (R-Michigan), chair of the Senate District of Columbia Committee, brought S.2637 to the floor of the Senate on June 24. McMillan argued that the cemetery trustees were not opposed to the road, just to the price to be paid for the condemned land. Senator George Graham Vest (D-Missouri) asked that the bill be temporarily tabled, and it was. On July 14, Senator Matt Whitaker Ransom (D-North Carolina) presented the Senate with a petition from 1,000 cemetery lotholders opposed to the Senate and House bills. (PHC director George Wagner later characterized the dispute over lotholder support as one Senator lying to another.) The objections raised by Vest and other senators were seemingly resolved by July 24, when McMillan again called the bill for a vote on the Senate floor. One change to the bill had been made, providing for federally-financed construction of a retaining wall on cemetery property if one was needed. But once more the bill was put on hold. Senator David Turpie (D-Indiana) objected to the bill overall, and Senator Francis Cockrell (D-Missouri) wanted a cap put on the price of the compensation.

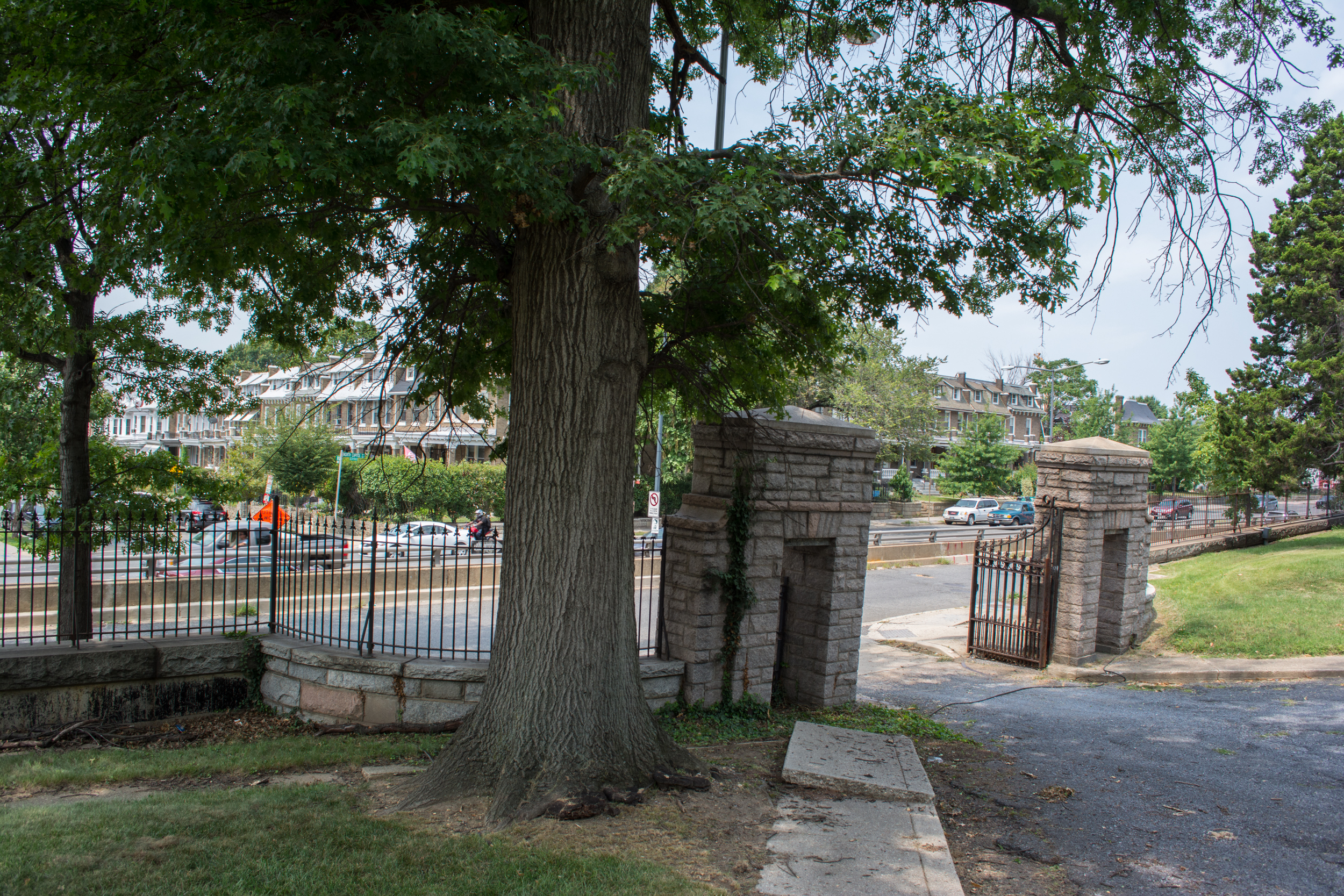
Looking northwest out the current main gates of the cemetery. The housing development beyond North Capitol Street was once cemetery land.

On November 22, 1892, the District of Columbia Court in Equity ruled in favor of the PHC trustees.

In December 1892, Charles Schneider's investigative committee reported back to the lotholders. He reported that the board of directors was still opposed to the construction of North Capitol Street across cemetery land. If Congress acted and stripped the cemetery of its rights, however, the investigative committee urged that the lotholders seek a fair price for the land (one much higher than the 1 cent per square foot offered other property owners). At a special meeting on December 7, the lotholders voted in favor of the report and to support the board of directors.

In a desperate attempt to win passage of the stalled legislation, the city commissioners held yet another hearing in the waning days of the 52nd Congress. The January 15th hearing was cancelled when the commissioners were unexpectedly called to Capitol Hill to testify. But PHC representatives noted that lobbyists for real estate syndicates showed up in large numbers for the hearing. The hearing was eventually held on January 23, but there was no new evidence or testimony offered and the stalemate continued.

Meanwhile, Congress approved an amendment to the charter of the Eckington and Soldiers' Home Railway, an electric streetcar company providing service in the Eckington neighborhood. The first electric streetcar company in the city, it began at the intersection of New Jersey Avenue NW and New York Avenue NW, ran north on New Jersey Avenue to Rhode Island Avenue NW, and then up 4th Street NW to Michigan Avenue NW (passing between Howard University and the McMillan Reservoir). Legislation to permit the streetcar company to extend its line along New York Avenue to North Capitol Street and then up North Capitol to the Soldier's Home was first introduced in Congress in December 1889, and was finally approved in February 1893.

The 53rd United States Congress opened on August 7, 1893, and ended on March 3, 1895. Democrats now held a majority in the Senate, and on August 30, 1893, Senator Isham G. Harris (D-Tennessee) (the President pro tempore of the United States Senate) introduced a new condemnation bill similar to S.2637. A slightly different bill was offered in the House. The House bill officially required the city to extend North Capitol Street through cemetery land. Although Congress had revamped the eminent domain process the previous year, the House bill forced the city to use the old process for condemning the property. Half the funds to pay for the land were appropriated from the U.S. Treasury, with the other half coming from District of Columbia revenues. Construction costs were capped at $10,000. On October 17, the House District of Columbia Committee recommended approval of this bill. The House legislation received a favorable reception in the Senate, and the Senate District of Columbia Committee approved it on December 7. The bill passed both chambers by voice vote on December 21, 1893.

With federal law no longer a bar to condemnation of cemetery land, the PHC announced it would cease to oppose the extension of North Capitol Street and allow a jury to determine an appropriate condemnation award.

=== The contentious condemnation and the Constitutional ruling ===
By mid-February 1894, the D.C. Supreme Court (Note: The D.C. Supreme Court sat as a federal district court for the purposes of eminent domain.) was close to naming a board of appraisers to determine the price of the Prospect Hill Cemetery land. PHC officials, however, were upset because the Panic of 1893 had depressed land values. Had Congress acted with more speed, the transaction would have been finalized years ago and the PHC would have received a better price.

The board of appraisers issued their report on March 16, 1894. The appraisers valued the land at $45,724 and assessed damages of $5,962 to the cemetery's remaining land, for a total compensation award of $51,686 ($1,923,316 in 2025 dollars). The price was more than 40 cents per square foot. Shocked at the high level of the award, the city appealed to the D.C. Supreme Court. But on June 24, 1894, the D.C. Supreme Court upheld the board of appraisers' award. The commissioners then appealed to the Court of Appeals of the District of Columbia. Work on North Capitol Street, then under way, ceased after reaching the border of the cemetery.

The city commissioners immediately sought the help of Congress. They proposed passage of legislation setting aside the appraisers' award, and to seek condemnation under the new eminent domain procedure enacted as part of the 1891 D.C. highway act (approved August 30, 1890). This bill was introduced in the Senate, and reported favorably by the Senate District of Columbia Committee on July 1, 1894. The Senate Appropriations Committee attached the bill to the D.C. appropriations legislation for 1895. The amended appropriations bill passed the Senate, and went to a House–Senate conference committee. The conference committee agreed on August 2 to retain the Prospect Hill Cemetery amendment. The legislation passed Congress on August 7, 1894.

The city filed a motion with the D.C. Supreme Court on August 13, asking that the appraisal be vacated. The court refused, declaring the Act of August 7, 1894, to be an unconstitutional interference in due process and the courts. The city appealed to the D.C. Court of Appeals. While the appeal was being heard, the city attempted to condemn a second piece of cemetery property. But the PHC sued to stop this condemnation proceeding, and on December 23, 1894, the D.C. Superior Court issued an injunction against the city which prevented any second condemnation until the appellate court ruled. The Court of Appeals consolidated both appeals.

On March 4, 1895, in District of Columbia v. Prospect Hill Cemetery, 5 C.App.D.C. 497 (1895), the D.C. Court of Appeals affirmed the ruling of the D.C. Supreme Court in both cases, and upheld the D.C. Supreme Court's holding that the Act of August 7, 1894, was unconstitutional. It ordered the city to pay the full $51,686 if it proceeded with condemnation. At the annual meeting of the Prospect Hill Cemetery lotholders in March, the lotholders voted to cease their opposition to the extension of North Capitol Street and drop all existing appeals.

The following month, however, the city commissioners again approached members of Congress to find a way to have the appraisal ruling overturned. More alarming to cemetery lotholders was a new city street map, which failed to show the cemetery and instead showed extensive subdivisions on the cemetery property. In May, the city went even further and published a street extension map showing an extension of Albany Street NW through the northern part of the burial ground.

=== Resolution of the North Capitol Street controversy ===
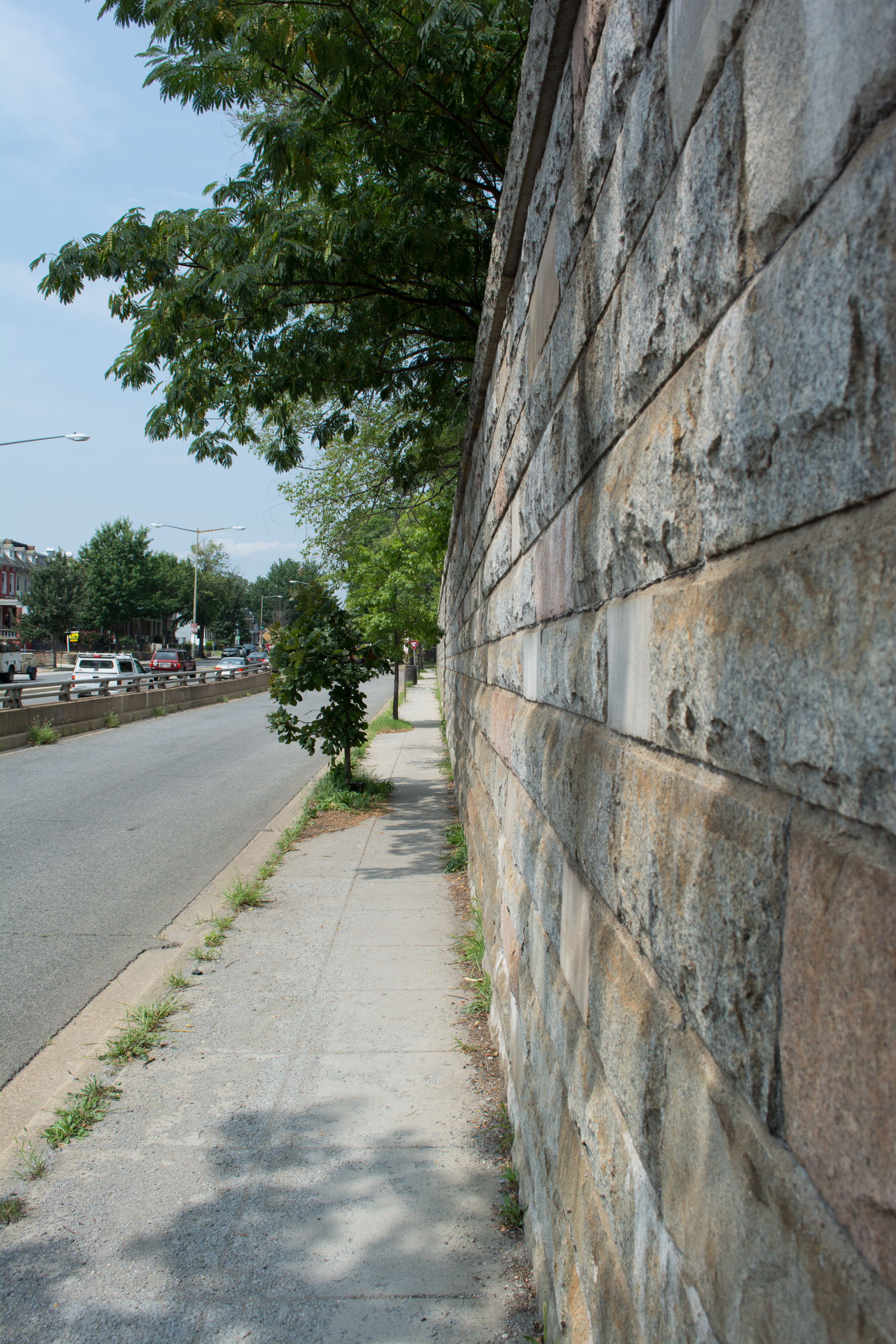
Retaining wall built along the North Capitol Street side of Prospect Hill Cemetery in 1917.

Events came to a head on October 4, 1895, when the city commissioners ordered North Capitol Street opened. The order, however, made no mention of any payment to Prospect Hill Cemetery. On October 5, PHC legal counsel filed a motion in the D.C. Supreme Court for a writ of mandamus ordering the city commissioners to pay the required $51,686. The city commissioners replied that they were under no obligation to do so, as they had not sought the land and no injury or loss of possession had occurred at Prospect Hill Cemetery. This argument proved unpersuasive to the court, and the writ was issued. The city appealed to the D.C. Court of Appeals.

On February 4, 1896, the Court of Appeals overturned the writ. The Court of Appeals agreed that the Act of December 21, 1893, clearly ordered the District of Columbia to open North Capitol Street. This command was not discretionary. The question was whether, and to what extent, the Act of August 7, 1895, repealed or altered this intent of Congress. The court was highly critical of the language of the Act of August 7. It was "most unwisely and improvidently drawn by some one who gave but little thought to it, and was undoubtedly passed without consideration; and in our former opinion, when its provisions were pressed upon our attention, we were compelled to disregard them". Even so, the court held, the Act of August 7, 1895, acted as a repeal of the Act of December 21, 1893. This left the method of condemnation specified in the second part of the Act of August 7 inconsistent and unenforceable. But with the requirement to open North Capitol Street now repealed, the commissioners were not obliged to take the land. The only way to interpret the Act of August 7, the court of appeals concluded, was to assume that Congress had withdrawn from the attempt at condemnation. No writ should issue, as the city commissioners had the right to refuse to take the land.

The 54th United States Congress began on December 2, 1895. On February 28, 1896, Representative George M. Curtis (R-Iowa) introduced a bill in the House ordering the city to open North Capitol Street though the lands owned by Prospect Hill Cemetery and Mrs. Barbour. The bill was silent as to the means of condemnation, and provided an open-ended appropriation to pay for the property. Construction costs were capped at $10,000, and were to be paid jointly by the federal government and the city. In the Senate, Joseph Roswell Hawley (R-Connecticut) introduced legislation which was similar to the Curtis bill. However, the Hawley bill specifically appropriated $51,686 from the U.S. Treasury to pay for the Prospect Hill Cemetery land.

The Senate District of Columbia Committee favorably reported bill the March 12. Although the city commissioners opposed the bill, arguing that it stripped the city of its procedures for securing eminent domain established in the Act of March 2, 1893. Representatives from PHC enthusiastically endorsed it. Senator McMillan, an initial supporter of the Hawley bill, now opposed it as too expensive. This doomed the Senate legislation. A companion to the Hawley bill, H.B.6788, was also opposed by the city commissioners. But on April 23, 1896, the D.C. Court of Appeals struck down the eminent domain assessment procedures established by the Act of March 2, 1893.

With the city bereft of a process for eminent domain, the objection raised by the commissioners no longer applied. Senator Hawley re-introduced his bill (S. 2332) on May 3, 1896. Determined to win passage of the legislation, the PHC hired ex-Representative John J. Hemphill (who had instigated the 1888 House subcommittee investigation) to represent it before Congress. But despite Hemphill's efforts, the bill languished in the Senate, and no action was taken by December.

Hemphill was far more effective in persuading his ex-colleagues in the House to act. On December 17, 1896, the House passed a companion bill (H.B. 6713) paying the PHC $51,686 for its land. H.B. 6713 headed for the Senate, where the Senate District of Columbia Committee favorably reported it on January 7. The Senate substituted H.B. 6713 for S. 2332, and on February 11, 1897—with just 20 days left in the 54th Congress—the legislation passed the Senate without discussion. Defeated, the city commissioners asked President Grover Cleveland to sign the bill. He signed it into law on February 20, 1897.

This ended a 12-year legal battle over the future of Prospect Hill Cemetery. The cemetery's size was reduced by 3 acres (12,000 m^{2}).

A receiving vault was constructed at Prospect Hill Cemetery some time in the late 1800s. The first mention of the vault came in 1880.

== 20th century ==
A chapel, designed by the D.C.-based architectural firm of Autenrieth and Goenner, was built at Prospect Hill Cemetery in the center of the circle bordering Lincoln Road NE in 1900.

=== Opening W Street NW ===
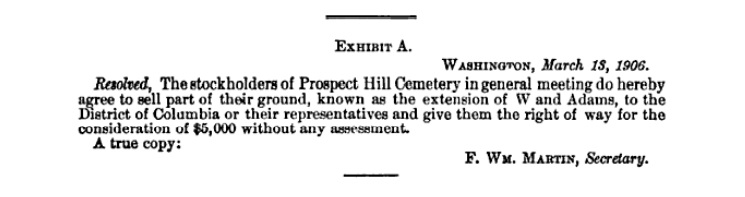
The resolution of the Prospect Hill Cemetery board of trustees, accepting $5,000 payment for its land for the W Street NW eastward extension.

The District of Columbia successfully opened W Street NW through cemetery land in a far less divisive way in 1907. The effort to open the street began in January 1903, when the city decided to open W Street NW between 2nd Street NW and North Capitol Street. This would have effectively divided the cemetery's land west of North Capitol Street into equal north and south portions. Congress, however, provided no funds to obtain the land and the city would not initiate eminent domain proceedings. Instead, the city requested that the land be donated, which the cemetery declined to do. When the city next raised the issue, a year later, the city's legal counsel said the land must be condemned because the cemetery's charter did not allow it to alienate land. Subsequently, a bill was introduced in Congress in February 1904 to pay Prospect Hill Cemetery $5,000 for the necessary land. The city then asked to extend Albany Street NW (now Adams Street NW) eastward as well. The 58th United States Congress ended without action being taken on either issue.

New legislation (S. 5119) was introduced in April 1906. This legislation limited W Street NW to just 80 feet (24 m) in width. The legislation permitted the city to seek condemnation of Prospect Hill Cemetery land in the courts, with the compensation award capped at $5,000. The legislation also stripped the D.C. and federal courts of jurisdiction over the case, barring any appeal by the cemetery or city. The bill passed the Senate on June 29. Congress, arguing that the street extension would significantly raise the property values of land in the immediate vicinity of W Street NW, taxed local landowners near the street to pay for the extension. These landowners, most of whom belonged to the North Washington Citizens' Association, were furious at what they perceived to be an excessively generous award (or, alternatively, an expensive tax to pay for the road). The citizens' association went on record denouncing the bill. Nonetheless, the bill passed the House on December 17, 1906. The land, however, was appraised at just $4,000. On May 1, 1907, the city moved forward with its condemnation and construction of the street.

=== Minor changes ===
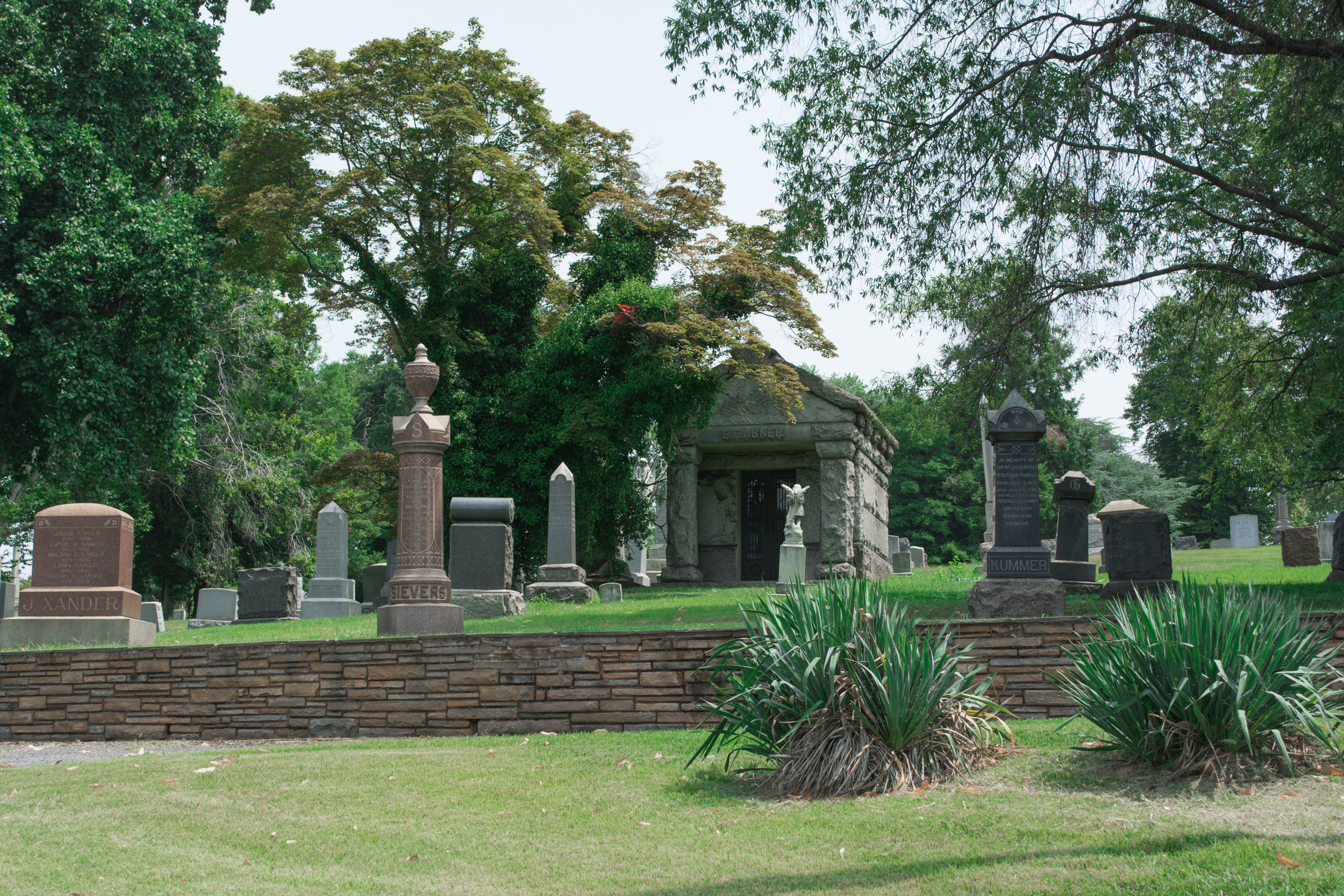
Looking east at Section D-North.

In December 1907, the District of Columbia placed a property assessment on landowners along North Capitol Street to pay for the installation of sidewalks. Prospect Hill Cemetery officials resisted paying the assessment, arguing that federal law specifically exempted their land from taxation. The outcome of the dispute is not known.

The extension of North Capitol Street led to significant changes at Prospect Hill Cemetery. A new retaining wall topped by a wrought iron fence and new main gate were constructed on North Capitol Street. Several sets of remains had to be reinterred to accommodate the new construction. Changes in the 1910s to Lincoln Road NE required the construction of a new wall and fence on the east side of the cemetery. Most of the original walls were torn down around 1917, and a new wall constructed. Portions of the wall consisted of ashlar granite blocks of various shades and colors, both coursed and randomly set. Other portions consisted of rusticated or rubble rock of various types (such as granite, greenschist, mica-schist, and other rock). The walls were topped with wrought iron fencing and cast iron finials.

Prospect Hill Cemetery constructed a new gatehouse at North Capitol Street and W Street NW in 1927. The square structure with fieldstone walls was two stories high. It had an attic and a hip roof, with a hip-roof dormer on the north and south sides.

As the Great Depression took hold, fewer changes were made at Prospect Hill Cemetery. With the cemetery not enclosed along V Street NW, the North Capitol Citizens' Association pressed for the cemetery to finish the wall and fence. They were successful, and in April 1933 cemetery officials hired the V.F. Duckett firm to design a $2,000 concrete and brick wall for its south border. But with economic conditions worsening, the cemetery put off the work until 1939.

=== Sale of the western cemetery land ===
The extension of North Capitol Street left 5 acres (20,000 m^{2}) (Note: With 3 acres sold to the city for the street extension in 1897, the cemetery was left with 14 acres. Today, Prospect Hill Cemetery has just 9 acres, which indicates that the western portion consisted of 5 acres.) of the cemetery on the west side of the street, while the remaining 9 acres (36,000 m^{2}) (where all the burials were) was to the east. Lots sales were almost nonexistent in the west portion of the cemetery, as individuals did not want to feel cut off from the cemetery. PHC resolved to sell off the eastern 5 acres (20,000 m^{2}), and in April 1920 legislation was introduced in Congress to permit the sale. This legislation died when the 66th United States Congress ended on March 3, 1921.

New legislation was introduced in the 67th United States Congress, and was enacted into law by Congress on January 21, 1922. The western five acres were sold off later in 1922.

Two major events happened at Prospect Hill Cemetery in 1929. The cemetery—which by now was advertising its nonsectarian nature—opened up two new sections in February, expanding the area for burials. In April, the government of the District of Columbia and Concordia Church both observed the 100th anniversary of the birth of attorney and newspaper publisher Louis F. Schade, who was buried at Prospect Hill Cemetery in 1903.

=== Mid to late 20th century ===
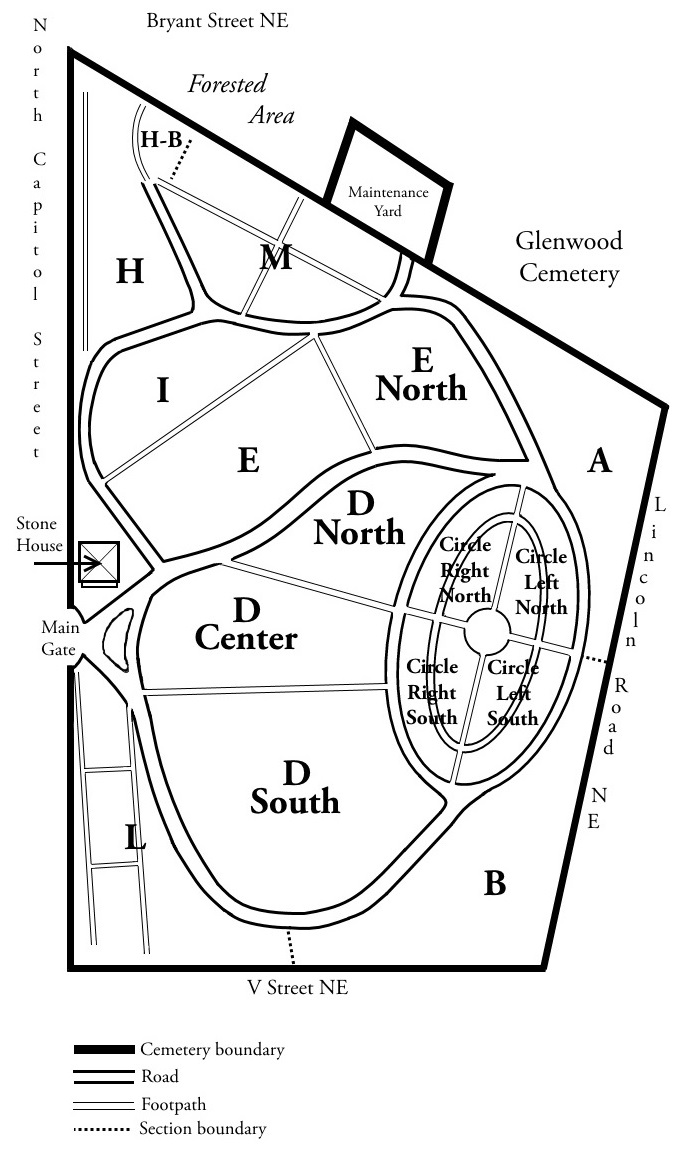
Map of Prospect Hill Cemetery as of 2014.

Hard-hit by the Martin Luther King, Jr. assassination riots of 1968, Washington, D.C.—and particularly the neighborhoods around Prospect Hill Cemetery—rapidly declined in the late 1960s and early 1970s. Daniel King, superintendent of the cemetery since 1925, and his family left the superintendent's residence in 1972 after numerous break-ins. Turnover in the superintendent position was heavy during the next 12 years.

Financially strapped due to lack of lot sales and lacking an endowment, Prospect Hill Cemetery entered into a management agreement with adjacent Glenwood Cemetery in 1985. The agreement proved unsatisfactory: A Glenwood employee rented out the Prospect Hill maintenance shed for use as a business, a portion of Prospect Hill was used for trash disposal without PHC permission, the grounds were ill-maintained, building repairs were not made, and PHC was overcharged for leaf removal. PHC officials rented out a portion of the cemetery to the District of Columbia Public Schools for a school bus parking lot, and a proposal was made to utilize part of the grounds as a pet cemetery. When Glenwood Cemetery said in 1992 that it would not renew the contract without a substantial fee increase, the Prospect Hill Cemetery board of directors voted to end the management agreement. With the advice of the Association for the Preservation of Historic Congressional Cemetery, which had helped save and revive Congressional Cemetery in the 1980s, Prospect Hill slowly recovered. The gatehouse (now called the Stone House) was renovated and made livable again, finances improved, and groundskeeping equipment was purchased.

The German-American Heritage Society placed a memorial plaque at the site of the former chapel in 1997, and a local garden club created and began maintaining a garden around it.

== 21st century ==
One fund-raising scheme bore fruit, however. In 2006, Prospect Hill Cemetery rented out a small portion of its maintenance yard for the erection of a cell phone tower.

In 2007, lotholders planted a Memorial Garden to beautify the grounds. The Memorial Garden was transplanted in 2009 to form the basis of a new Memorial Grove. The Memorial Grove was planted against the northern boundary of the burial grounds to help conceal Prospect Hill's and Glenwood Cemetery's maintenance yards. The Memorial Grove was a gift from District 1 of the National Capital Area Garden Clubs, and was completed in September 2009. During preparation of the ground, Prospect Hill Cemetery discovered that the District of Columbia Water and Sewer Authority (DCWASA) had installed a 12-inch (30 cm) water line through the northern part of the cemetery in 1896. Although the cemetery provided DCWASA with an easement for the water line, these records were lost. The line was located and marked. A sculpted stone angel, which years ago had fallen from a century-old grave, was installed on a foundation in the center of the grove.

Prospect Hill began a years-long effort to repair roadways and paved walkways throughout the cemetery in 2010. Lanham Construction Co. began a $1,600 repair effort on the sidewalk between the gatehouse and the maintenance shed and on the sidewalk adjacent to the gatehouse in Fall 2010. Sidewalks and steps in Section E of the cemetery followed in 2012.

The cemetery made two major repairs in 2011. Advisory Neighborhood Commission 5C met with cemetery officials to discuss the deteriorating fence along the alley south of Bryant Street NE. The fence was overgrown, and damaged in places where local people had attempted to dump trash and large objects over the fence. Although the damage was not the fault of Prospect Hill, the cemetery agreed to repair the fence at a cost of $5,500. Repairs included removing vegetation, repairing the wall and fence, extending the wall and fence a short distance, and reinforcing the fence posts with angle braces.

The second major repair effort involved the Stone House. The 2011 Virginia earthquake struck the city on August 23, 2011, followed by Hurricane Irene on August 26–28. Some tombstones were toppled by the earthquake, and some trees fell over during the storm (damaging the stone angel in the Memorial Grove), but surprisingly little other damage occurred. Major leaks in the Stone House occurred during the hurricane, however, and a post-storm investigation revealed that the clay tile roof needed major repair. Further investigation showed that the leaks had rotted eaves and roof joists. The project, expected to cost $75,000, was completed on November 7, 2011, at a total cost of $129,500.

The Memorial Grove angel, whose wing and head were broken off during the hurricane, was repaired in the summer of 2013 and reset on its foundation.

== About the cemetery ==
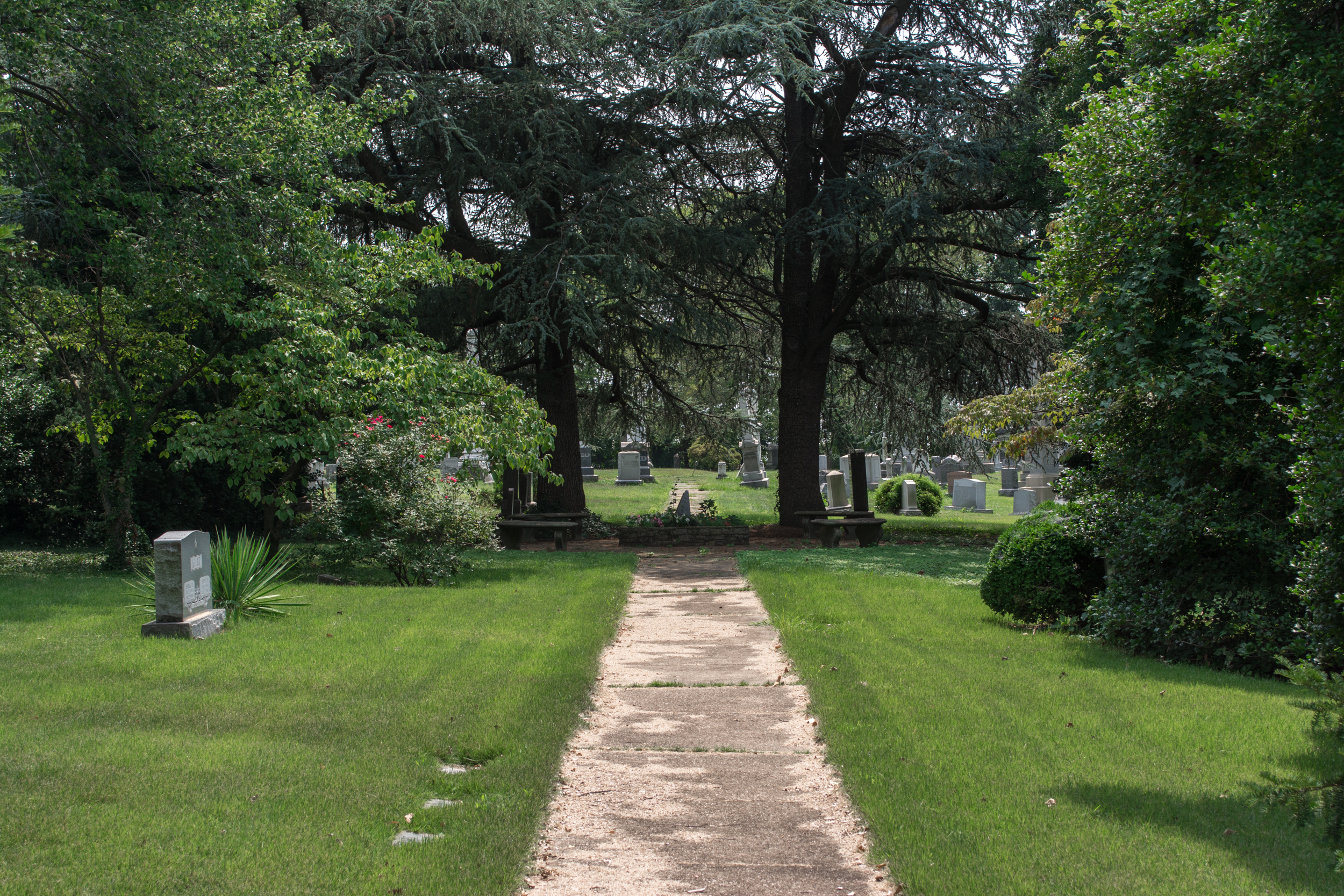
Looking at Chapel Circle on the east side of the cemetery.

Prospect Hill remains an active burial ground. Hundreds of burials plots remained for sale in late 2010.

The cemetery retains its character as a garden cemetery, including its asymmetrical, winding pathways and roads; landscaping; and walls. Burials occur in plots and in rows, and many graves are marked with good examples of Victorian funerary art. Many markers from the mid to late 1800s markers are simple slabs or headstones carved from limestone or marble, which is typical for the mid-Atlantic area in the 1800s. Later monuments tend to be larger and more ornate, and several prominent sculptors are known to have created pieces for the cemetery. Included among them are works by noted German-American artist Jacques Jouvenal. About 75 percent of the 14,000 burials at Prospect Hill Cemetery in 2006 are German Americans, and the cemetery remains the historic burying ground of the city's once-large German American community. Most of the remaining graves represent European families. Almost 200 Civil War veterans, most of them German Americans who served in the 8th Battalion, are buried at Prospect Hill. The cemetery began converting its burial records to electronic format in late 2012. The first information to be digitized were lot ownership records, with burial records to follow.

The cemetery's western, northern, and eastern walls and iron fences date to about 1917, while the southern wall and fence date to 1939. The walls are of varying height, color, and construction.

The barn, farmhouse, 1873 gatehouse, and chapel were all demolished in the 20th century. The date of the chapel's demolition is unclear but it was in use for both funerals and other public services (such as Memorial Day worship) until 1950. The late 1800s receiving vault was also demolished in the 20th century. It remained in use at least until 1945. The 1927 gatehouse remains, however, and has retained its historic integrity.

Prospect Hill Cemetery was added to District of Columbia register of historic places in 2005.

== Notable interments ==
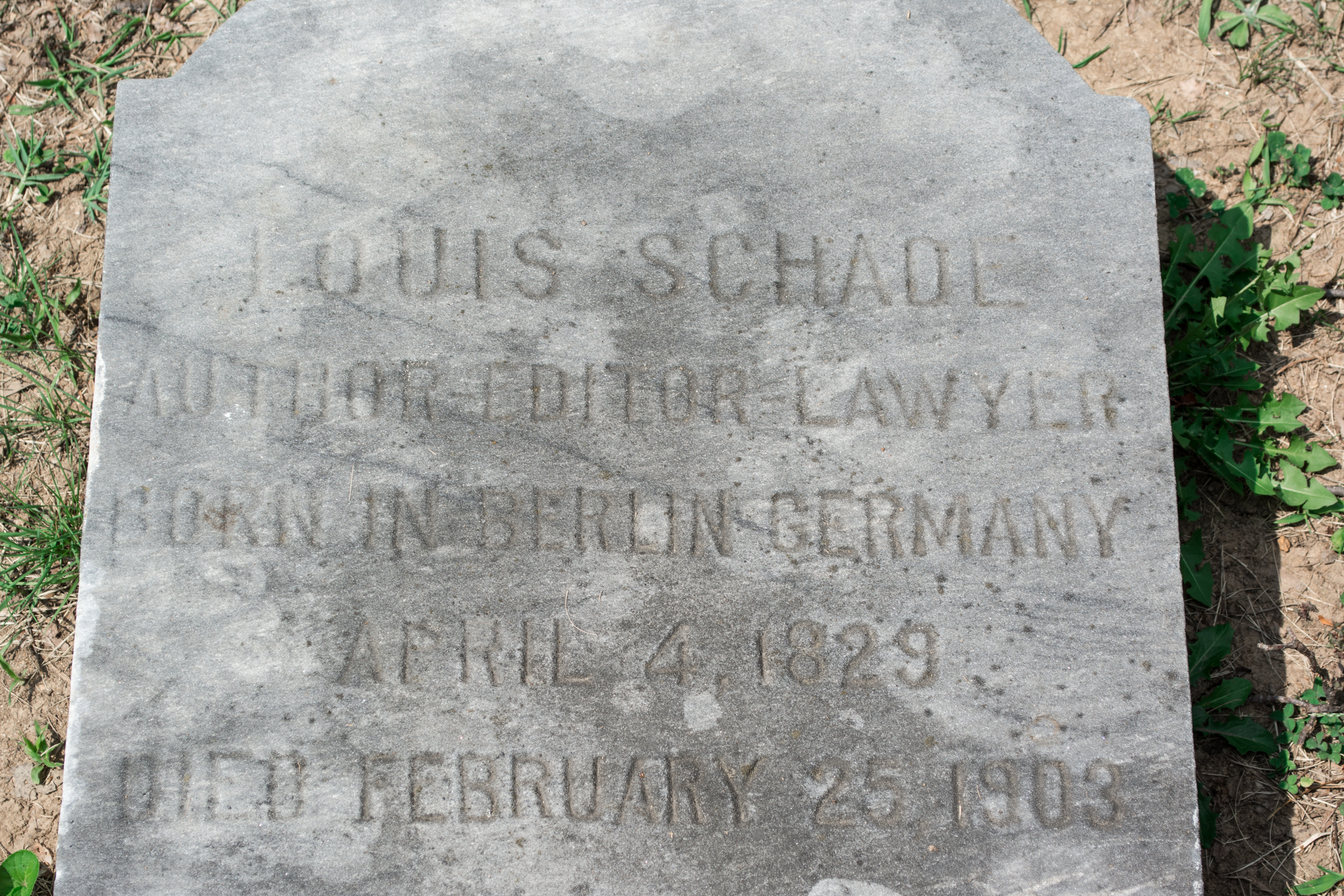
Grave of Louis F. Schade

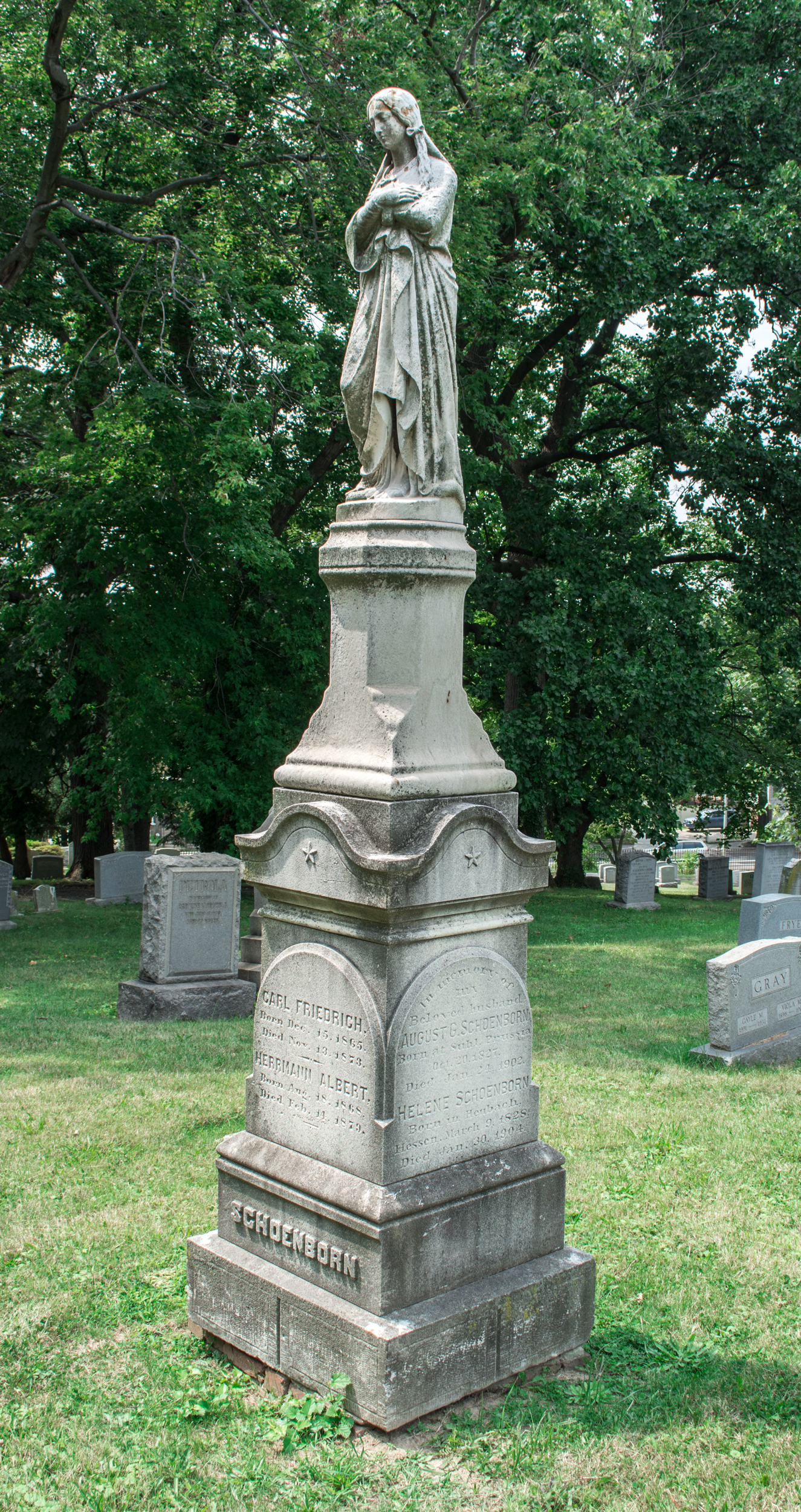
Grave of August Schoenborn

- Edward Abner (1834–1914) – Local beer brewer who partnered with Robert Portner to found a brewery; later owned several beer gardens and restaurants in the District of Columbia
- Edward F. Abner (1864–1910) – Local beer brewer who bought the Albert Brewery and later the Abner-Drury Brewery; nephew of Edward Abner
- Louis Beyer (1827–1904) – Local beer brewer who owned the Metropolitan Brewery
- Henry Buttner (1834–1911) – President of the German Building Association
- Herbert J. Fahy (1898–1930) – Lockheed test pilot, co-founder of Washington Airport, and, at the time of his death, world record holder for endurance flying (36 hours, 56 minutes)
- William Searcy Flippin (1827–1899) – Tennessee circuit court judge and long-time reporter for the Sixth Judicial Circuit Court of the United States
- Joseph Gerhardt (1817–1881) – Brevet Brigadier General in the Union Army and commander of the 46th New York Volunteer Infantry; cited for gallant and meritorious service during the American Civil War
- Joe Gerhardt (1855–1922) – Known as "Move 'Em Up Joe", he was an American professional baseball player from 1873 to 1893 and son of Brig. Gen. Joseph Gerhardt
- Werner Koch (1834–1911) – Newspaper publisher and editor of the Intelligenzblatt (a German language newspaper) and the Washington Journal (one of the longest-publishing newspapers in the city)
- George A. Parkhurst (1841–1890) – American actor who was on stage at Ford's Theatre when Abraham Lincoln was shot
- William A. Petersen (1816–1871) – A tailor who owned the Petersen House, where President Abraham Lincoln died on April 14, 1865
- Karl Rudolph Powalky (1817–1881) – Noted astronomer who made calculations regarding the orbits of planets, asteroids, and the Sun, greatly improving astronomical observational accuracy.
- Louis F. Schade (1829–1903) – Editor of Stephen A. Douglas' newspapers National Demokrat and National Union in Chicago; editor of The Washington Sentinel in the District of Columbia; defense attorney for Confederate war criminal Henry Wirz; purchaser of the Petersen House
- August Schoenborn (1827–1902) – Architect who designed the 1860 iron dome for the United States Capitol
- Charles Shambaugh (1839–1913) – Medal of Honor recipient for valor during the Battle of Glendale on June 30, 1862, in Henrico County, Virginia
- Charles Schneider (1841–1911) – Director of the Second National Bank, founder of Charles Schneider Baking Company, and co-founder and first president of the National Master Baker's Association of the United States and Canada

Daniel Reintzel, mayor of Georgetown, was disinterred from Presbyterian Burying Ground in November 1907. The Evening Star newspaper reported that he was reburied at Prospect Hill Cemetery, but this is inaccurate. He was reburied in the Masonic Circle at Glenwood Cemetery in Washington, D.C.

== Bibliography ==
- Bain, Robert T. (2005). Lincoln's Last Battleground: A Tragic Night Recalled. Bloomington, Ind.: AuthorHouse. ISBN 1420859722.
- Crew, Harvey W.; Webb, William Bensing; Wooldridge, John (1892). Centennial History of the City of Washington, D.C., With Full Outline of the Natural Advantages, Accounts of the Indian Tribes, Selection of the Site, Founding of the City ... to the Present Time. Dayton, Ohio: United Brethren Pub. House.
- Domer, Samuel; Alden, Lucius D. (1893). History of St. Paul's English Lutheran Church. Washington, D.C.: St. Paul's Lutheran Church.
- Franscell, Ron (2012). The Crime Buff's Guide to Outlaw Washington, D.C. Guilford, Conn.: Globe Pequot Press. ISBN 9780762773855.
- Franke, David (April 1956). "Washington's First Trinity". Concordia Historical Institute Quarterly: 55–57.
- Historic American Landscapes Survey (2005). Congressional Cemetery (Washington Burying Ground), 1801 E Street Southeast, Washington, District of Columbia. HALS DC-1 (PDF). National Park Service, U.S. Department of the Interior. Archived from the original (PDF) on 2014-08-10.
- Historic Preservation Review Board (April 2006a). 27th Annual Report to the Council of the District of Columbia on the Implementation of the D.C. Historic Landmark and Historic District Protection Act of 1978 (PDF). Washington, D.C.
- Historic Preservation Review Board (2006b). Decision of the District of Columbia Historic Preservation Review Board in Historic Landmark Designation Case No. 04-13: Prospect Hill Cemetery, 2201 North Capitol Street NE (Square 3505, Lot 801) (PDF). Washington, D.C.
- Hodgson, Larry (2001). The Garden Lover's Guide to Canada. New York: Princeton Architectural Press. ISBN 1568982798.
- LeeDecker, Charles H. (2009). "Preparing for an Afterlife of Earth: The Transformation of Mortuary Behavior in Nineteenth-Century North America". In Majewski, Teresita; Gaimster, David R. M. (eds.). International Handbook of Historical Archaeology. New York: Springer. ISBN 9780387720685.
- Linden-Ward, Blanche (2007). Silent City On a Hill: Picturesque Landscapes of Memory and Boston's Mount Auburn Cemetery. Amherst, Mass.: University of Massachusetts Press. ISBN 9781558495715.
- Macfarland, Henry B.F. (1908). District of Columbia: Concise Biographies of Its Prominent and Representative Contemporary Citizens, and Valuable Statistical Data. Washington, D.C.: Potomac Press.
- Mickey, Thomas J. (2013). America's Romance With the English Garden. Athens, Ohio: Ohio University Press. ISBN 9780821420355.
- Peck, Garrett (2014). Capital Beer: A Heady History of Brewing in Washington, D.C. Charleston, S.C.: American Palate. ISBN 9781626194410.
- Polmar, Brigette; Polmar, Norman (2010). Washington, D.C.'s Most Wanted: The Top 10 Book of Tourist Treasures, Powerful Politicians, and Capital Wonders. Washington, D.C.: Potomac Books. ISBN 9781597971508.
- Sanger, George P., ed. (1863). The Statutes at Large, Treaties, and Proclamations of the United States of America, From December 5, 1859, to March 3, 1863. Vol. 12. Boston: Little, Brown.
- Superintendent of Documents (1897). Catalogue of United States Public Documents. Washington, D.C.: Government Printing Office.
- Thomas, Jeannie B. (2003). Naked Barbies, Warrior Joes, and Other Forms of Visible Gender. Urbana, Ill.: University of Illinois Press. p. 32. ISBN 9780252028540.
- Vercelloni, Matteo; Vercelloni, Virgilio (2010). Inventing the Garden. Los Angeles: J. Paul Getty Museum. ISBN 9781606060476.
- Worpole, Ken (2003). Last Landscapes: The Architecture of the Cemetery in the West. London: Reaktion. ISBN 186189161X.
