= 46th New York Infantry Regiment =

- Active: July 23, 1861 to July 28, 1865
- Country: United States
- Allegiance: Union
- Branch: Infantry
- Engagements: Siege of Fort Pulaski; Battle of Secessionville; Second Battle of Bull Run; Battle of South Mountain; Battle of Antietam; Battle of Fredericksburg; Siege of Vicksburg; Jackson Expedition; Knoxville Campaign; Battle of the Wilderness; Battle of Spotsylvania Court House; Battle of North Anna; Battle of Totopotomoy Creek; Battle of Cold Harbor; Siege of Petersburg; Battle of the Crater; Battle of Globe Tavern; Battle of Peebles's Farm; Battle of Boydton Plank Road; Battle of Hatcher's Run; Battle of Fort Stedman; Appomattox Campaign; Third Battle of Petersburg

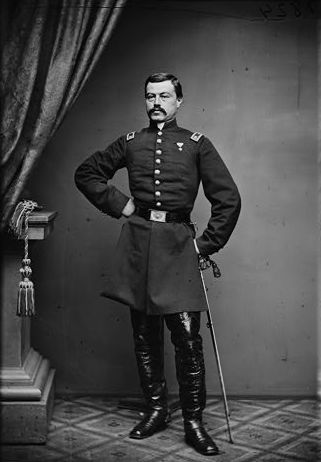
Capt. Hugo von Brandenstein, 46th New York Volunteer Infantry

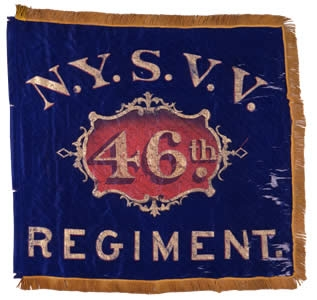
Flank marker

The 46th New York Infantry Regiment ("Fremont Rifle Regiment") was an infantry regiment in the Union Army during the American Civil War.

== Service ==
The 46th New York Infantry was organized at New York City, New York and mustered by companies beginning July 29, 1861 for three years' service under the command of Colonel Rudolph Rosa.

The regiment was attached to Viele's 1st Brigade, Sherman's South Carolina Expeditionary Corps, October 1861 to April 1862. 2nd Brigade, 2nd Division, Department of the South, to July 1862. 2nd Brigade, 1st Division, IX Corps, Army of the Potomac, to April 1863. 2nd Brigade, 1st Division, IX Corps, Army of the Ohio, to June 1863. 3rd Brigade, 2nd Division, IX Corps, Army of the Tennessee, to August 1863. 2nd Brigade, 1st Division, IX Corps, Army of the Ohio, to April 1864. 2nd Brigade, 1st Division, IX Corps, Army of the Potomac, to May 1864. 2nd Brigade, 4th Division, V Corps, to June 11, 1864. 2nd Brigade, 3rd Division, IX Corps, to September 1864. 2nd Brigade, 1st Division, IX Corps, to July 1865.

The 46th New York Infantry mustered out July 28, 1865.

== Detailed service ==
Left State for Washington, D.C. September 16, 1861, then moved to Annapolis, Md. Expedition to Port Royal, S.C., October 21-November 7, 1861. Capture of Forts Walker and Beauregard, Port Royal Harbor and Hilton Head, S.C., November 7. Duty at Hilton Head, S.C., until March 1862. Occupation of Edisto Island, S.C., February 11. Wilmington and Whitmarsh Islands March 30–31. Bombardment and capture of Fort Pulaski, Ga., April 10–11. Expedition to James Island June 1–28. Action at James Island June 8. Battle of Secessionville June 16. Evacuation of James Island and movement to Hilton Head June 28-July 7. Moved to Newport News July 12–17, then to Fredericksburg, Va., August 2–6. Operations on the Rapidan and Rappahannock Rivers August 13–27. Pope's Campaign in northern Virginia August 16-September 2. Battle of Groveton August 29. Second Battle of Bull Run August 30. Battle of Chantilly September 1. Maryland Campaign September 6–22. Battle of South Mountain September 14. Battle of Antietam September 16–17. Duty in Maryland until October 11. March up the Potomac to Leesburg, then to Falmouth, Va., October 11-November 18. Battle of Fredericksburg, Va., December 12–15. "Mud March" January 20–24, 1863. Moved to Newport News, Va., February 13, then to Kentucky March 21–26. Duty at Paris, Nicholasville, Lancaster, Stanford, and Somerset, Ky., until June. Movement through Kentucky to Cairo, Ill., June 4–10, then to Vicksburg, Miss., June 10–14. Siege of Vicksburg June 14-July 4. Advance on Jackson, Miss., July 5–10. Siege of Jackson July 10–17. Destruction of Mississippi Central Railroad at Madison Station July 18–22. At Milldale until August 12. Moved to Covington, Ky., August 12–22. Burnside's Campaign in eastern Tennessee August 16-October 17. March over Cumberland Mountains into eastern Tennessee August 27-September 26. Action at Blue Springs October 10. At Lenoir until November 14. Campbell's Station November 16. Siege of Knoxville November 17-December 4. Pursuit of Longstreet December 5–24. Operations in eastern Tennessee until March 1864. Moved to Annapolis, Md., March–April. Campaign from the Rapidan to the James May 3-June 15. Battle of the Wilderness May 5–7. Spotsylvania May 8–12. Spotsylvania Court House May 12–21. Assault on the Salient or "Bloody Angle" May 12. North Anna River May 23–26. Jericho Ford May 23. On line of the Pamunkey May 26–28. Totopotomoy May 28–31. Cold Harbor June 1–12. Bethesda Church June 1–3. Before Petersburg June 16–18. Siege of Petersburg June 16, 1864 to April 2, 1865. Mine Explosion, Petersburg, July 30, 1864. Weldon Railroad August 18–21. Poplar Springs Church September 29-October 2. Reconnaissance on Vaughan and Squirrel Level Road October 8. Boydton Plank Road, Hatcher's Run, October 27–28. Fort Stedman March 25, 1865. Appomattox Campaign March 28-April 9. Fall of Petersburg April 2. Occupation of Petersburg April 3. Pursuit of Lee April 3–7. Moved to Washington, D.C., April 21–27, and duty there until July. Grand Review of the Armies May 23.

== Casualties ==
The regiment lost a total of 195 men during service; 8 officers and 96 enlisted men killed or mortally wounded, 2 officers and 89 enlisted men died of disease.

== Commanders ==
- Colonel Rudolph Rosa - wounded in action at the Second Battle of Bull Run; discharged December 17, 1862
- Colonel Joseph P. Gerhardt
- Colonel George W. Travers - promoted but never mustered at rank
- Lieutenant Colonel Adolph Becker - commanded from the Battle of Fort Stedman to muster out
- Major Julius Parcus - commanded at the Second Battle of Bull Run after Col. Rosa was wounded
- Captain Alphons Servieri - commanded during the Knoxville Campaign

== See also ==
- List of New York Civil War regiments
- New York in the Civil War
