= The Andersonville Trial =

1959 Broadway play and 1970 courtroom drama TV film

The Andersonville Trial is a 1959 hit Broadway play by Saul Levitt. It was later adapted into a television production and presented as part of the PBS anthology series Hollywood Television Theatre.

== Development as Climax! episode ==
Interest in the subject—the actual 1865 court-martial of Henry Wirz, commander of the infamous Confederate Andersonville prison, where thousands of Union prisoners died—had been stimulated by MacKinlay Kantor's historical novel Andersonville, which won the Pulitzer Prize for Fiction in 1956. Shifting from a novel about the camp to a courtroom drama, Levitt first wrote the story into an episode of the CBS series Climax!, which aired as The Trial of Captain Wirz on June 27, 1957. The episode featured Everett Sloane as Wirz and Charlton Heston as Norton P. Chipman, the War Department's prosecutor.

== Broadway production ==
Levitt next turned to treatment as a play, called The Andersonville Trial, which opened at Henry Miller's Theatre on December 29, 1959, and ran for 179 performances. The production was directed by José Ferrer and opened with George C. Scott as Chipman, Herbert Berghof as Wirz, Albert Dekker as Wirz's defense counsel, and Russell Hardie as Union general Lew Wallace, who presided over the court-martial. Ian Keith, who played Dr. John C. Bates, an Andersonville camp surgeon and key witness for the prosecution regarding the fate of Union prisoners, died during the show's run and was replaced by Douglas Herrick.

Scott later recalled that what he found most difficult about playing Chipman onstage was that the defendant Wirz came across as a tragic, sympathetic victim, although his negligence, according to the verdict, had a great deal to do with the deplorable conditions at Andersonville. Meanwhile, he felt the audience was compelled to dislike Chipman, despite being essentially the hero of the story due to his efforts to obtain justice for all the men who suffered and died at the camp.

== Television adaptation ==
The Andersonville Trial
- Genre: Drama
- Written by: Saul Levitt
- Directed by: George C. Scott
- Starring: William Shatner; Richard Basehart; Jack Cassidy; Buddy Ebsen; Martin Sheen; Cameron Mitchell
- Country of origin: United States
- Original language: English

Production
- Producer: Lewis Freedman
- Running time: 150 minutes
- Production company: Community Television of Southern California/PBS

Original release
- Network: NET
- Release: May 17, 1970

Instead of acting, George C. Scott returned as a director when Levitt created an adaptation of the play for television. The production aired May 17, 1970 on NET, now featuring William Shatner as Chipman, Richard Basehart as Wirz, Jack Cassidy as Wirz's defense counsel, Cameron Mitchell as Wallace, and Buddy Ebsen as Dr. Bates. In the course of filming Shatner, who was recently divorced, met for the first time the woman who became his second wife, Marcy Lafferty.

The television adaptation did well at the 1971 Emmy Awards, winning the award for Outstanding Single Program - Drama or Comedy, as well as for "Technical Direction and Electronic Camerawork". Levitt took home the award for Outstanding Writing Achievement in Drama (Adaptation). The program was also honored with a Peabody Award. Cassidy was nominated for the Emmy for Outstanding Single Performance by an Actor in a Leading Role, but lost to his director, as Scott won for starring in an adaptation of Arthur Miller's play, The Price.

== PBS cast and characters ==
- William Shatner as Lt. Col. Norton P. Chipman
- Cameron Mitchell as Maj. Gen. Lew Wallace
- Richard Basehart as Capt. Henry Wirz
- Jack Cassidy as Otis Baker
- Martin Sheen as Capt. Williams
- Buddy Ebsen as Dr. John Bates
- Albert Salmi as James Gray
- John Anderson as Ambrose Spencer
- Michael Burns as James Davidson
- Woodrow Parfrey as Louis Schade
- Harry Townes as Col. Chandler
- Whit Bissell as Dr. Ford
- Alan Hale, Jr. as court-martial board member
- Ian Wolfe as court-martial board member
- Ford Rainey as court-martial board member
- Dallas McKennon as First Guard
- Lou Frizzell as Jasper Culver - (Frizzell had been cast as a soldier in the play. Although Scott returned to direct, Frizzell was the only member of the original Broadway cast to appear on camera in the PBS production. Robert Gerringer played the part of Culver on Broadway.)
- Robert Easton as Court Reporter
