= Andersonville Raiders =

Civil War prison gang

The Andersonville Raiders were a prison gang of Union POWs incarcerated at the Confederate Andersonville Prison during the American Civil War. Led by their chieftains – Charles Curtis, John Sarsfield, Patrick Delaney, Teri Sullivan (aka "WR Rickson", according to other sources), William Collins, and Alvin T. Munn – these soldiers terrorized their fellow POWs, stealing their possessions and sometimes even committing murder.

An internal force of soldiers with a policing role, called the "Regulators", was eventually formed to counter the Raiders' theft and violence, which eventually led to an extreme prison riot that resulted in the capture and trial of the Raiders' leaders in the early summer of 1864. On July 11, 1864, six of the Raiders' leaders were hanged, concluding the group's control of the Confederate prison. Even so, the prisoners would still live in horrid conditions after this, ending with more than 13,000 soldiers dying in the prison by the end of the war.

== Historical context ==
Formally called "Camp Sumter", Andersonville (as it was later named by prisoners) was established in February 1864 in the small town of Andersonville, Georgia. The camp was established in response to a surplus in prisoners-of-war (POWs) that was the result of a breakdown in POW exchanges in 1863. The surplus had led to overcrowding in Confederate-run POW camps across the northern part of the Confederacy, particularly in the Richmond camps. As a result, the Confederacy needed to create a large Southern prison that could handle a considerable population of inmates.

Andersonville, Georgia, was chosen as a strategic location for the Confederacy's new prison due to its small location and close proximity to fresh water and a railroad. Originally about 16 acres (65,000 m^{2}), the camp was later expanded to 26 acres (110,000 m^{2}). The entire camp was surrounded by a 15 foot (4.6 m) high stockade, with large guard towers known as "pigeon roosts" located every 30 yards. Located about 15 feet (4.6 m) from the stockade was a smaller fence called the "dead line" (so termed because any prisoner who crossed this fence would be shot).

Its creators built Andersonville not for quality but with the dual priorities of preventing escape and enabling as many prisoners as possible to be housed within the new camp. No wooden barracks were built; prisoners were required to live in self-built tents. At its height in August 1864, the camp housed over 30,000 Union prisoners of war.

== Prison conditions ==
Conditions at Andersonville were among the worst of all Civil War prison camps; the camp was extremely overcrowded and starvation was a common cause of death. The overcrowding, coupled with unsanitary conditions, caused illnesses to flourish within the camp. When food was available, prisoners would often suffer from diseases caused by contaminated food and water. Dysentery, scurvy, and gangrene became prolific as a result of the harsh conditions and poor quality of food.

In addition to the severe health issues, records indicate that guards often behaved sadistically, sometimes killing prisoners regardless of whether they were breaking camp rules or crossing over the "dead line". Contributing to the fearsome conditions were the Andersonville Raiders, who used theft, murder, and terror to obtain goods and power within the prison.

== Organization and methods ==
"The Raiders", as they were called within the camp, were known throughout Andersonville for their harsh tactics and vicious behavior towards their fellow inmates. According to John McElroy, the Raiders used various methods to get what they wanted, ranging from "sneak thievery to highway robbery". The group's most common method of stealing food and goods involved looking out for "promising subjects" in crowds of new prisoners, tricking their targets by pretending to help them find a good place to sleep, and then beating and robbing them.

Another of the Raiders' favored techniques involved sending out teams of spies to track down prisoners suspected of having valuables which could be traded to camp guards. After determining that a prisoner had something of value, the Raiders would wait for him to fall asleep and would then raid his tent. If the prisoner awoke during the robbery, the raiders would threaten him with death if he tried to resist.

The Raiders were well organized and had many members who performed a variety of tasks. It is unclear exactly how many members the group had; some sources put membership at 50, while others propose numbers as high as 500. The best estimate is that the Raiders consisted of at least 100 regular members, as well as a number of others who would do favors for the group or provide assistance in exchange for compensation.

The group was centrally organized around its six most important members, known as the "chieftains": Charles Curtis, John Sarsfield, Patrick Delaney, Teri Sullivan (or W.R. Rickson, according to other sources), William Collins, and A. Munn. According to Futch, each of the leaders had henchmen who were organized into groups named after the leaders, such as "Collins's Raiders" and "Curtis's Raiders".

As a result of their widespread thievery, the Raiders were well stocked and enjoyed considerably better living conditions than their fellow prisoners. They possessed a variety of weapons, ranging from axes to bowie knives. They were also well fed, which gave them a major advantage when it came to fighting; many of their victims were suffering from malnutrition, and consequently were considerably weaker and less able to defend themselves. In addition, for living quarters, the Raiders were able to build a tent that was large enough to fit over one hundred men, constructed mostly with stolen materials.

Given the harsh conditions, overcrowding, and scarcity of basic items needed for survival within Andersonville, the Raiders' actions often resulted in dire consequences for their victims. When the Raiders stole from a person, they would put that person at risk of dying as an indirect or direct result of the robbery. For example, according to former prisoner Warren Goss, in an autobiography of his time spent at Andersonville, the indirect effect of the Raiders "[s]tealing blankets from boys unaccustomed to hardships was downright murder", because the victim would then be exposed to the "chill dews of evening and the frequent rains... and was sure to sicken and die". Death could also result more directly from the Raiders' actions, as when a prisoner attempted to resist being robbed by the Raiders, and was murdered in the process. Another account of life at Andersonville describes one such occurrence: "one poor fellow came to an untimely death at their [the Raiders'] hands... because he showed resistance to their inhuman attempts".

While resistance to the Raiders' actions could prove deadly, it also was sometimes effective. Victims – particularly new inmates – would often be awoken in the middle of the night with a knife to their throat, with their attackers threatening to cut their throat if they moved. Nevertheless, some victims succeeded in defending themselves from these attacks and escaping. John McElroy describes one such event, in which a young man was attacked by eleven Raiders but managed to escape by hitting one of his attackers in the head with a spade; the attacker was knocked down and his fellow Raiders retreated. It was common for the Raiders to retreat as soon as they realized a form of significant resistance was at hand.

While resistance had the potential to be successful, the camp's prisoners needed the motivation to fight the Raiders, and this proved to be a major barrier. The prisoners were suffering from widespread disease, starvation, and the effects of the other harsh conditions within the camp. In contrast to the well-fed, well-stocked, and well-organized Raiders, the prisoners' physical capabilities for resistance, and their abilities to sustain a motivated, organized resistance effort, were significantly weakened. However, by mid-June 1864, the prisoners decided that they could no longer tolerate the Raiders' terrorization and control over Andersonville in addition to the constant threats they also experienced from the camp's guards and the constant risk of death due to the conditions within the camp. They organized to bring their complaints to Confederate authorities, and they also formed an inner prison police force to defend against and capture the Raiders.

== Defense against the Raiders ==
The first organized resistance efforts within Andersonville involved small groups of prisoners - usually members of the same company or squadron – forming together in defense against the Raiders. The groups would agree that if one of their members were attacked, he would scream out an agreed-upon code word; the other members of the group would then come to the victim's defense and would scare away the attackers. For example, members of the Plymouth Squad would yell "Plymouth!" when being attacked, and all of the other members of the squad would come to their rescue. McElroy also describes a similar situation in which a victim would scream "Raiders!" and the prisoners around him would attack the robbers. However, in order to defeat the Raiders, the prisoners would have to become more organized, and would also need some sort of backing from the Confederate authorities.

On June 29, 1864, a prisoner named Dowd was beaten severely by two Raiders, and had some of his valuables (including a watch and money) stolen. After his attack, Dowd went immediately to the front gate of the prison in order to confront the Confederate guards and demand justice. His complaints caught the interest of Andersonville's commandant, Captain Henry Wirz. After hearing Dowd's story, Wirz announced that he would cut off all rations until the Raiders were turned in.

As a result of Wirz's actions, an internal police force, commonly known as "the Regulators", was quickly organized within the camp. The Regulators were not new to the camp, but they became significantly more powerful after Dowd's case was brought to Captain Wirz. According to McElroy, a small band of soldiers calling themselves the Regulators had previously existed within the camp; prior to Wirz's involvement, their actions were limited to beating Raiders who attacked other prisoners. However, after Wirz became involved, permission to organize a police force was given to the inmates, and the Regulators began to make arrests and hold the individuals they arrested until they were given a fair trial.

The Regulators were also given additional powers beyond the ability to arrest and hold suspects. According to the diary of a prisoner named John Ransom, Captain Wirz gave the internal police force permission to set up a court and put offenders on trial. Wirz also gave the Regulators full permission to administer any punishments they deemed necessary, from more minor penalties such as lashings or public humiliation, to death by hanging.

== Arrest and punishment ==
Most of the Regulators' arrests of suspected Raiders took place between June 29 and July 10, 1864, when the main offenders were tried and hanged. The Regulators were able to round up most of the Raiders by attacking them at their headquarters; while the Raiders put up considerable resistance, they were overthrown by the Regulators. In his diary, Ransom notes that the first night of arrests were successful because, "thirty or forty of the worst characters in camp had been taken outside".

Ransom also notes that it was very difficult to protect the captured Raiders from being lynched, rather than being given a fair trial as promised. Estimates of how many Raiders were arrested vary from source to source, but the number is likely to be somewhere between 75 (according to what Ransom believed) and 150 (as estimated by McElroy).

After the Raiders' arrests, as promised by Captain Wirz, the offenders were put on trial for their crimes against their fellow prisoners. The court was set up much like a typical court, including a judge and jury of the offenders' peers. Of those who were convicted by the court, many were given relatively light sentences, such as "setting in the stocks, strung up by the thumbs, thumb screws, head hanging, etc." Another of the lesser punishments was the running of the gauntlet. Those sentenced to this punishment were forced to run through a gauntlet of inmates who were given clubs and allowed to hit the offenders as they ran by. In some cases, the Raiders running the gauntlet were able to escape with just a few blows to the head, but a few were beaten so badly that they died as a result of their injuries.

While most of the convicted Raiders received non-lethal punishments, six members, who were considered the group's leaders, were given the most severe punishment: death by hanging.

The six leaders – Sarsfield, Collins, Curtis, Delaney, Munn, and Sullivan – were executed on July 11, 1864, by method of hanging, on a set of gallows that was built that day. On the way to the gallows, Curtis escaped from his rope ties and fled, but was caught by the police and returned to the gallows. Each man was given time to say some last words before he was hanged. Munn expressed great remorse for his acts and hoped that God would show him mercy; Collins pleaded for mercy from the crowd and claimed that he was innocent; and Sarsfield gave a long speech in which he, too, expressed some regret. Delaney and Curtis, however, showed no contrition; Delaney went so far as to say that he would "rather be hanged than live here [in Andersonville]". All six were buried separately from the rest of those who died at the camp. Their execution marked the end of the Raiders' reign over Andersonville.

== See also ==
- Batavia (ship) - Analogous situation amongst marooned shipwreck survivors.
- Andersonville (film) - The Raiders are featured in the film.

== Sources ==
- Davis, Robert S. Ghosts and Shadows of Andersonville: Essays on The Secret Social Histories of America's Deadliest Prison. Macon, GA: Mercer University Press, 2006. ISBN 978-0-88146-012-4.
- Futch, Ovid L. History of Andersonville Prison. Gainesville, FL: University of Florida Press, 1968.
- Goss, Warren L. The Soldiers Story of His Captivity at Andersonville, Belle Isle, and Other Rebel Prisons. Boston, MA: I.N. Richardson & CO, 1872.
- Kellogg, Robert H. Life and Death in Rebel Prisons. Freeport, New York: Books For Libraries Press, 1865 rpt 1971.
- McElroy, John. This was Andersonville. Ed. by Roy Meredith. New York: McDowell, Obolensky, Inc., 1865 rpt 1957.
- Ransom, John L. John Ransom's Andersonville Diary. Middlebury, VT: Paul S Erikson, 1881 rpt 1963.
