= Henry Wirz =

Confederate States Army officer and doctor (1823–1865)

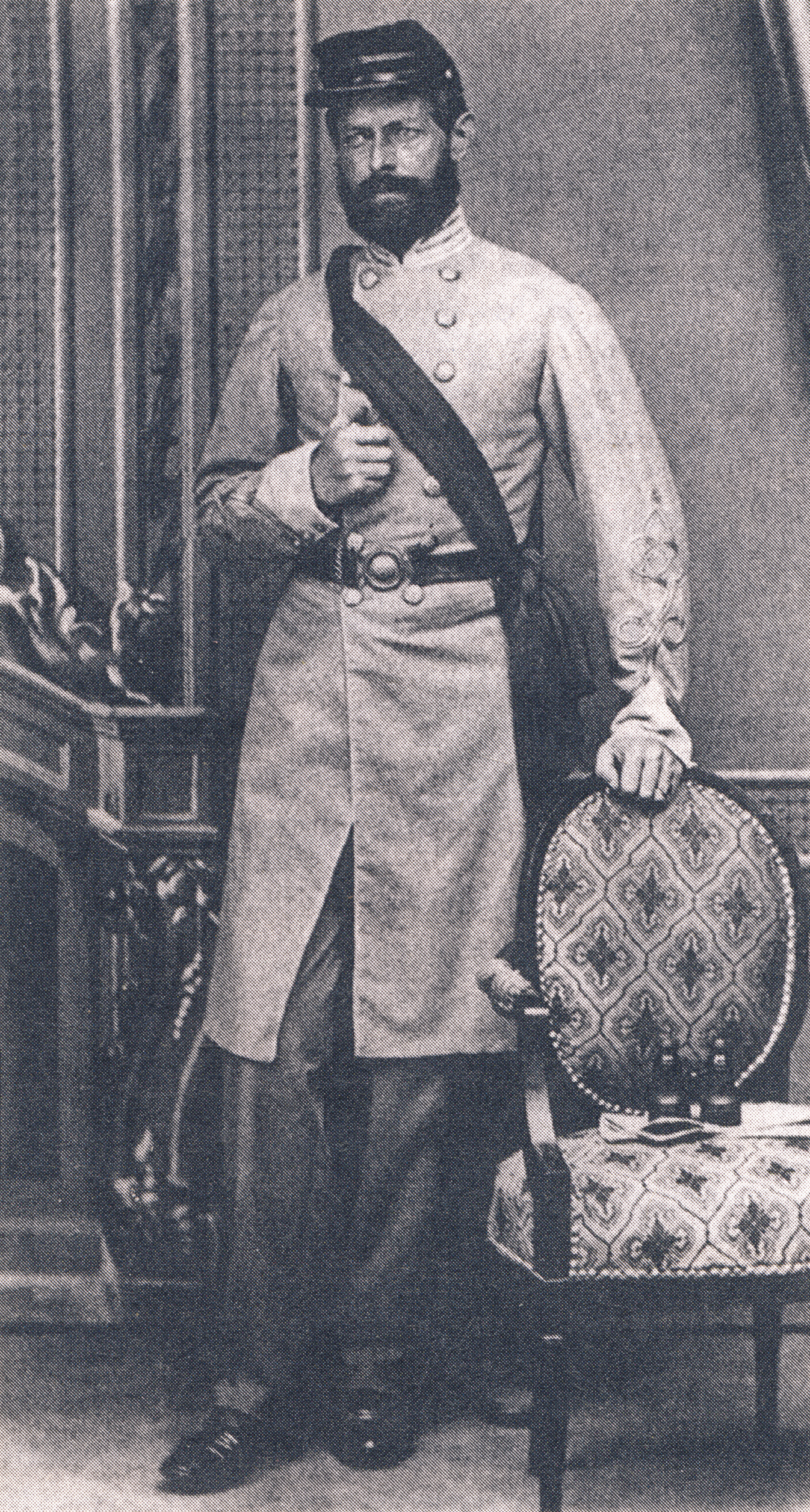
- Wirz in c. 1865
- Born: Hartmann Heinrich Wirz; November 25, 1823; Zurich, Switzerland
- Died: November 10, 1865 (aged 41); Old Capitol Prison, Washington, D.C., U.S.
- Burial place: Mount Olivet Cemetery
- Spouses: Emilie Oschwald (m. 1845; div. 1853) Elizabeth Wolfe (m. 1854)
- Children: 3
- Status: Executed by hanging
- Convictions: Conspiracy to commit war crimes; War crimes (10 counts)
- Penalty: Death
- Military career
- Allegiance: Confederate States of America
- Branch: Confederate States Army
- Service years: 1861–1865
- Rank: Captain
- Commands: Andersonville Prison
- Conflicts: American Civil War; Battle of Seven Pines

Henry Wirz (born Hartmann Heinrich Wirz; November 25, 1823 – November 10, 1865) was a Confederate States Army officer and convicted war criminal best known for commanding Andersonville Prison during the American Civil War. Born in Zurich, Switzerland, Wirz immigrated to the United States in 1849 after being exiled from the canton of Zurich following a conviction of embezzlement and fraud. He worked in a Massachusetts factory for five years before moving south to Kentucky to begin a career in medicine; specializing in homeopathy, Wirz divided his time between the two states. In 1854, he moved to Louisiana with his new wife and her two daughters, working as an overseer on a slave plantation.

When the Civil War broke out in 1861, Wirz enlisted in the Confederate army. In 1862, he was promoted to captain and placed in charge of managing Confederate prisoner-of-war camps. Two years later, he was made commandant of the newly-built Camp Sumter, where approximately 45,000 Union prisoners of war were kept and nearly 13,000 Union prisoners died during the camp's 14-month existence. Following the Confederate defeat in 1865, Wirz was arrested and tried by the U.S. government on charges of mistreating and murdering Union POWs in the camp. Found guilty of conspiracy and murder, he was executed by hanging in the Old Capitol Prison. Wirz's legacy has been contested since his death, with many Southerners viewing his post-war trial as being a form of victor's justice.

== Early life and career ==
Wirz was born Hartmann Heinrich Wirz on November 25, 1823, in Zurich, Switzerland, to Johann Caspar Wirz, a master tailor and member of Zurich's city council, and Sophie Barbara Philipp. Wirz received elementary and secondary education, and he aspired to become a physician but his family did not possess funds to pay for his medical education. Instead, he was educated as a merchant in Zurich and Turin from 1840 until 1842, when he began working at the department store of Zurich. He married Emilie Oschwald in 1845 and had two children.

In 1847, Wirz was sentenced to four years in prison on charges of embezzlement and fraud. He was released the next year and his sentence was commuted to 12 years of exile from the canton of Zurich, but his wife refused to emigrate and obtained a divorce in 1853. Wirz first went to Moscow, in 1848, and the next year to the United States, where he found employment in a factory in Lawrence, Massachusetts. After five years, he moved to Hopkinsville, Kentucky, and worked as a doctor's assistant. There, he learned to perform small surgeries and cast fractures. He tried to establish his own homeopathic medicine practice in Cadiz, Kentucky, and also worked as superintendent of a water cure clinic in Northampton, Massachusetts.

In 1854, Wirz married the Methodist widow Elizabeth Wolfe (née Savells). Along with her two daughters, they moved to Louisiana, where Wolfe gave birth to their daughter. In 1856, Wirz became acquainted with Levin R. Marshall, the owner of the slave plantation "Cabin Teele", who employed him as its overseer and where he set up a practice for homeopathic medicine.

== Civil War ==
Upon the outbreak of the American Civil War in 1861, the 37-year-old Wirz enlisted as a private in Company A (Madison Infantry), 4th Battalion of Louisiana Infantry of the Confederate army in Madison Parish. Shortly before his death, he said that he had taken part in the Battle of Seven Pines in May 1862, as an aide-de-camp to General Joseph E. Johnston, during which he was wounded by a Minie ball and lost the use of his right arm. That account is disputed by historians, one of whom says the injury may have actually occurred during a six-thousand mile mission to track down missing records of Union prisoners. That journey and a subsequent three months of rehabilitation at his home were completed by the end of 1862.

After returning to his unit on June 12, 1862, Wirz was promoted to captain "for bravery on the field of battle." Because of his injury, Wirz was assigned to the staff of General John H. Winder, who was in charge of Confederate prisoner-of-war camps, as his adjutant. Later accounts by Wirz's daughter alleged that Confederate President Jefferson Davis made Captain Wirz a "special minister" and sent him to Europe carrying secret dispatches to Confederate commissioners James M. Mason in England and John Slidell in France. Wirz returned from Europe in January 1864 and reported to Richmond, Virginia, where he began working for General Winder in the prison department. Wirz initially served on detached duty as a prison commandant in Alabama, but was then transferred to help guard Union prisoners incarcerated at Richmond.

=== Camp Sumter ===
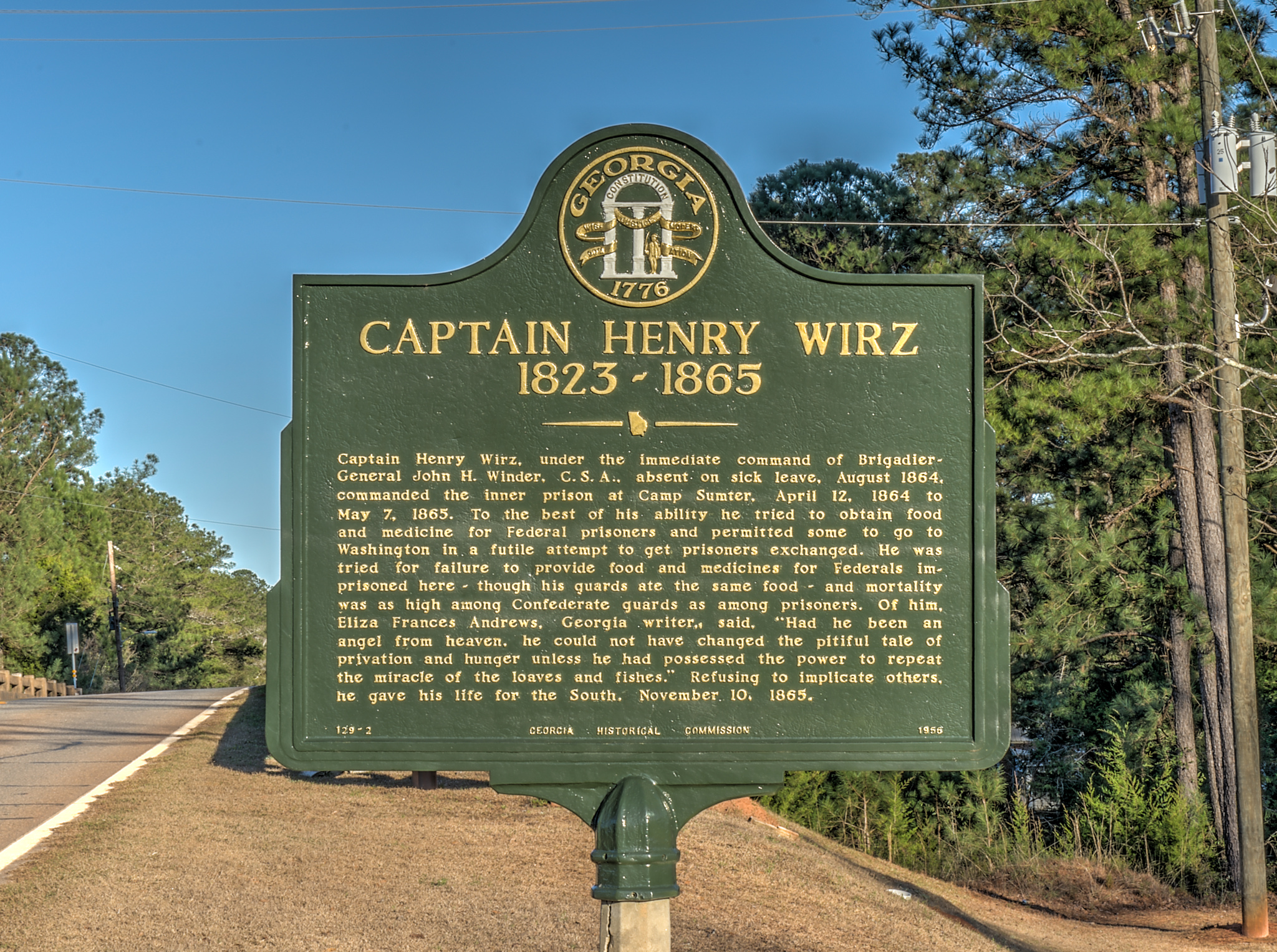
Historic marker for Wirz at Andersonville, Georgia. The claim in the marker that guards died at the same rate as prisoners is incorrect.

In February 1864, the Confederate government established Camp Sumter, a large military prison near the small railroad depot of Anderson (now Andersonville) in south-western Georgia, built to house Union prisoners-of-war. In April 1864, Wirz arrived at Camp Sumter and remained there for over a year holding the post of commandant of the stockade and its interior. Wirz was praised by his many superiors and even by some prisoners and was even recommended for but not promoted to major.

Camp Sumter had not been constructed to its full plan and was quickly overwhelmed by the influx of Union prisoners. Though wooden barracks were originally planned, the Confederates incarcerated the prisoners in a vast rectangular open-air stockade originally encompassing 16.5 acres (6.7 ha), which had been intended as only a temporary prison pending exchanges of prisoners with the Union. The prisoners gave this place the name "Andersonville", which became the colloquial name for the camp. Camp Sumter suffered from severe overcrowding, poor sanitary conditions, and an extreme lack of food, tools, medical supplies, and potable water. Wirz recognized that the conditions were inadequate and petitioned his superiors to provide more support but was denied. In July 1864, he sent five prisoners to the Union with a petition written by the inmates asking the government to negotiate their release.

At its peak in August 1864 after its expansion to 26 acres, the prison held some 33,000 Union prisoners – around four times more than any other Confederate prison – with little more than patchy tents for shelter. The same summer saw more than 100 prisoners die of disease, exposure, or malnutrition every day. Around 45,000 prisoners were incarcerated during the camp's 14-month existence, of whom close to 13,000 (28%) died.

== Trial and execution ==
Wirz was arrested by a contingent of the 4th U.S. Cavalry on May 7, 1865, in Andersonville. He was taken first to Macon, Georgia, and then by rail to Washington, D.C., arriving there on May 10, 1865, where he was held in the Old Capitol Prison since the federal government decided to put him on trial for conspiring to impair the lives of Union prisoners of war. A special military commission was convened with Maj. Gen. Lew Wallace presiding. The other members were Gershom Mott; John W. Geary; Lorenzo Thomas; Francis Fessenden; Edward S. Bragg; John F. Ballier, U.S. Volunteers; T. Allcock, 4th New York Artillery; and John H. Stibbs, 12th Iowa Volunteers. Col. Norton P. Chipman served as Judge Advocate. During the trial gangrene prevented Wirz from sitting and he spent the trial on a couch.

=== Charges ===
The military tribunal took place between August 23 and October 18, 1865, was held in the United States Court of Claims, and dominated the front pages of newspapers across the United States. Wirz was charged with "combining, confederating, and conspiring, together with John H. Winder, Richard B. Winder, Joseph [Isaiah H.] White, W. S. Winder, R. R. Stevenson, and others unknown, to injure the health and destroy the lives of soldiers in the military service of the United States, then held and being prisoners of war within the lines of the so-called Confederate States, and in the military prisons thereof, to the end that the armies of the United States might be weakened and impaired, in violation of the laws and customs of war" and for "violation of the laws of war, to impair and injure the health and to destroy the lives—by subjecting to torture and great suffering; by confining in unhealthy and unwholesome quarters; by exposing to the inclemency of winter and to the dews and burning sun of summer; by compelling the use of impure water; and by furnishing insufficient and unwholesome food—of large numbers of Federal prisoners." Wirz was accused of committing 13 acts of personal cruelty and murders in August 1864: by revolver (specifications 1, 3, 4), by physically stomping and kicking the victim (specification 2), by confining prisoners in stocks (specifications 5, 6), by beating a prisoner with a revolver (specification 13) and by chaining prisoners together (specification 7). Wirz was also charged with ordering guards to fire on prisoners with muskets (specifications 8, 9, 10, 12) and to have dogs attack a prisoner (specification 11).

=== Testimonies ===
The National Park Service lists 158 witnesses who testified at the trial, including former Camp Sumter prisoners, ex-Confederate soldiers, and residents of nearby Andersonville. According to Benjamin G. Cloyd, 145 testified that they did not observe Wirz kill any prisoners; others failed to identify specific victims. Twelve said that they witnessed cruelty on the part of Wirz. O.S. Belcher, James K. Davidson, and Dr. A.V. Barrows all testified that Wirz boasted to them he was killing more Yankees in the prison than Robert E. Lee was killing at the front. Many witnesses described guards shooting prisoners at random while Wirz looked on with indifference. However, only a single person claimed to have witnessed a murder committed directly by Wirz: Felix de la Baume, who claimed to be a descendant of the Marquis de Lafayette, identified under oath a victim allegedly killed personally by Wirz. Among those giving testimony was Father Peter Whelan, a Catholic priest who worked with the inmates, who testified on Wirz's behalf. A former Andersonville guard named James Duncan was called to testify for the defence, but was arrested when he tried to give evidence for allegedly causing the death of a prisoner at Andersonville.

The trial is notable for the landmark and politically pointed use of testimony from Black prisoners of war. In the Antebellum South, testimony from Black Americans would have been inadmissible. Wirz's defense stepped into the larger racial politics of the trial by citing case law from the antebellum Georgia Supreme Court, which had ruled that the use of dogs was acceptable when hunting escaped slaves. This defense was used to invoke Wirz's history as a former overseer and to condemn him for using plantation methods on prisoners.

=== Written evidence ===
The prosecutors located a secret report on Andersonville written by Confederate surgeon Joseph Jones, which detailed the horrific conditions he encountered there in mid-September 1864. After the end of the war, Jones had sought to suppress this report, saying that it "would only engender angry feelings, and place weapons in the hands of the victors." Jones reluctantly answered a federal subpoena and testified that his report was accurately excerpted. The use of Jones' report as evidence is believed to have strongly influenced the verdict of the trial.

=== Verdict ===
In early November 1865, the Military Commission found Wirz guilty of criminal conspiracy as charged, along with 10 of 13 specifications of acts of personal cruelty, and sentenced him to death. He was acquitted of specifications 4, 10, and 13.

In his report on the trial, the Judge Advocate General Joseph Holt, who had prosecuted the Lincoln assassination trials, vilified Wirz and pronounced that "his work of death seems to have been a saturnalia of enjoyment for the prisoner [Wirz], who amid these savage orgies evidenced such exultation and mingled with them such nameless blasphemy and ribald jest, as at times to exhibit him rather as a demon than a man."

In a letter to U.S. President Andrew Johnson, Wirz asked for clemency, but the letter went unanswered. The night before his execution, Louis F. Schade, an attorney working on behalf of Wirz, was told by an emissary from a high Cabinet official that if Wirz implicated Jefferson Davis in the atrocities committed at Andersonville, his sentence would be commuted. Allegedly, Schade repeated the offer to Wirz who replied, "Mr. Schade, you know that I have always told you that I do not know anything about Jefferson Davis. He had no connection with me as to what was done at Andersonville. If I knew anything of him, I would not become a traitor against him, or anybody else, even to save my life." The Rev. P. E. Bole received the same visitor and later sent a letter to Jefferson Davis, who included it as well as Wirz's reply to Schade in his book, Andersonville and Other War-Prisons (1890). Andersonville quartermaster Richard B. Winder, who was in the prison at the time, also confirmed this episode.

=== Execution ===
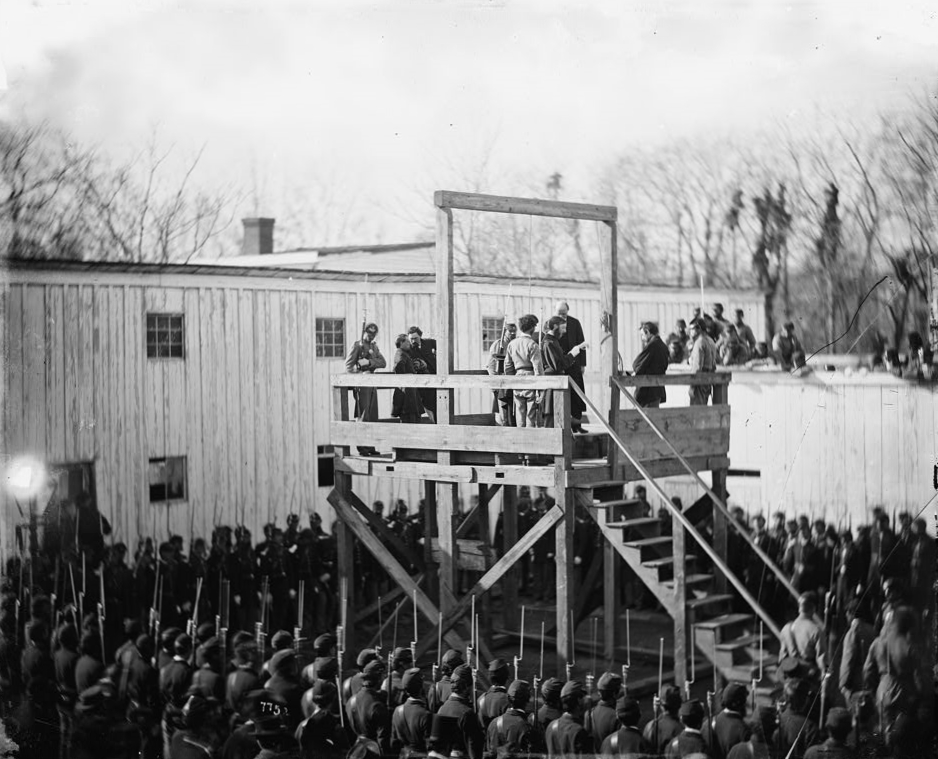
Wirz hears his death warrant at the scaffold near the U.S. Capitol

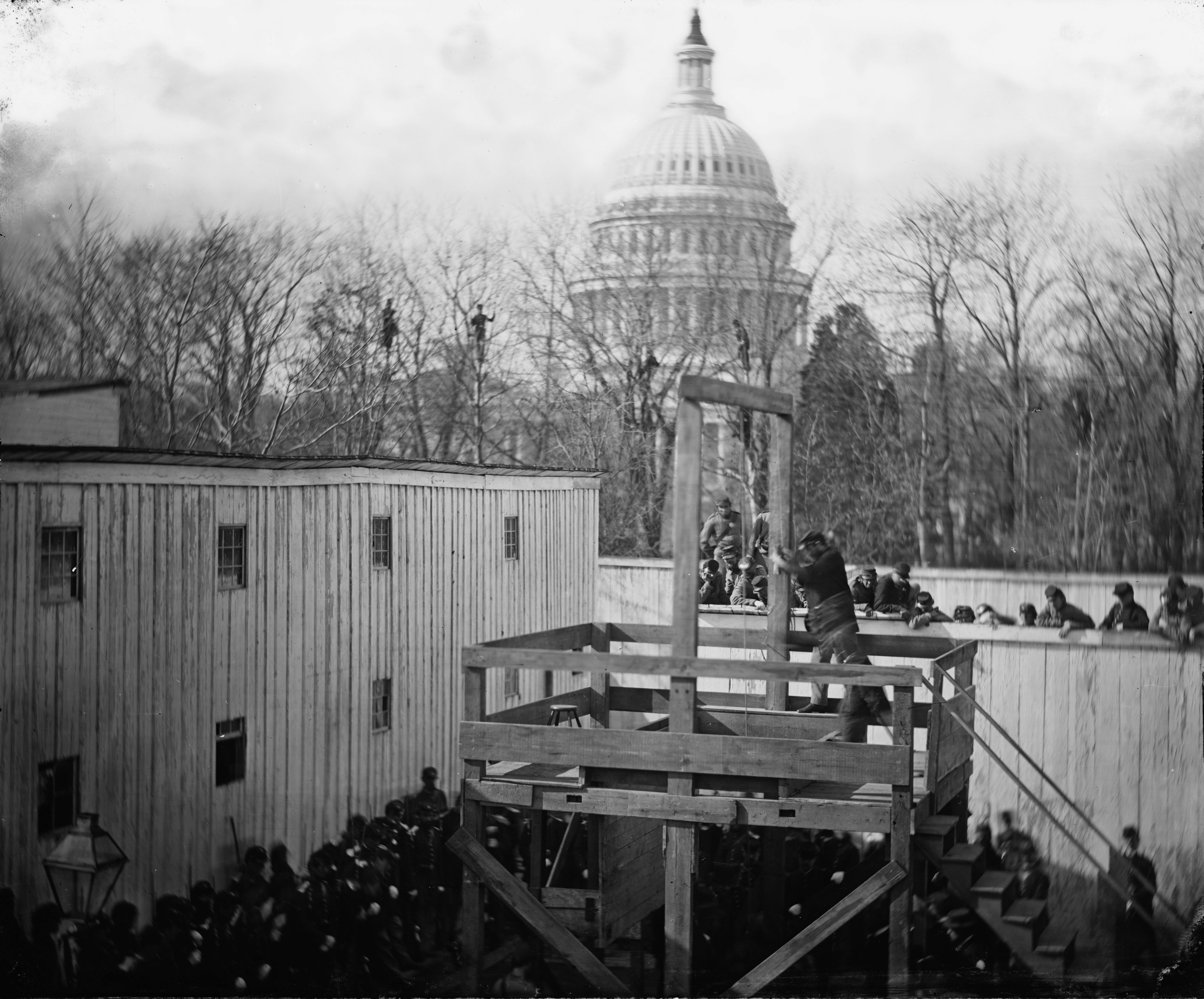
Wirz's execution moments after the trapdoor was sprung

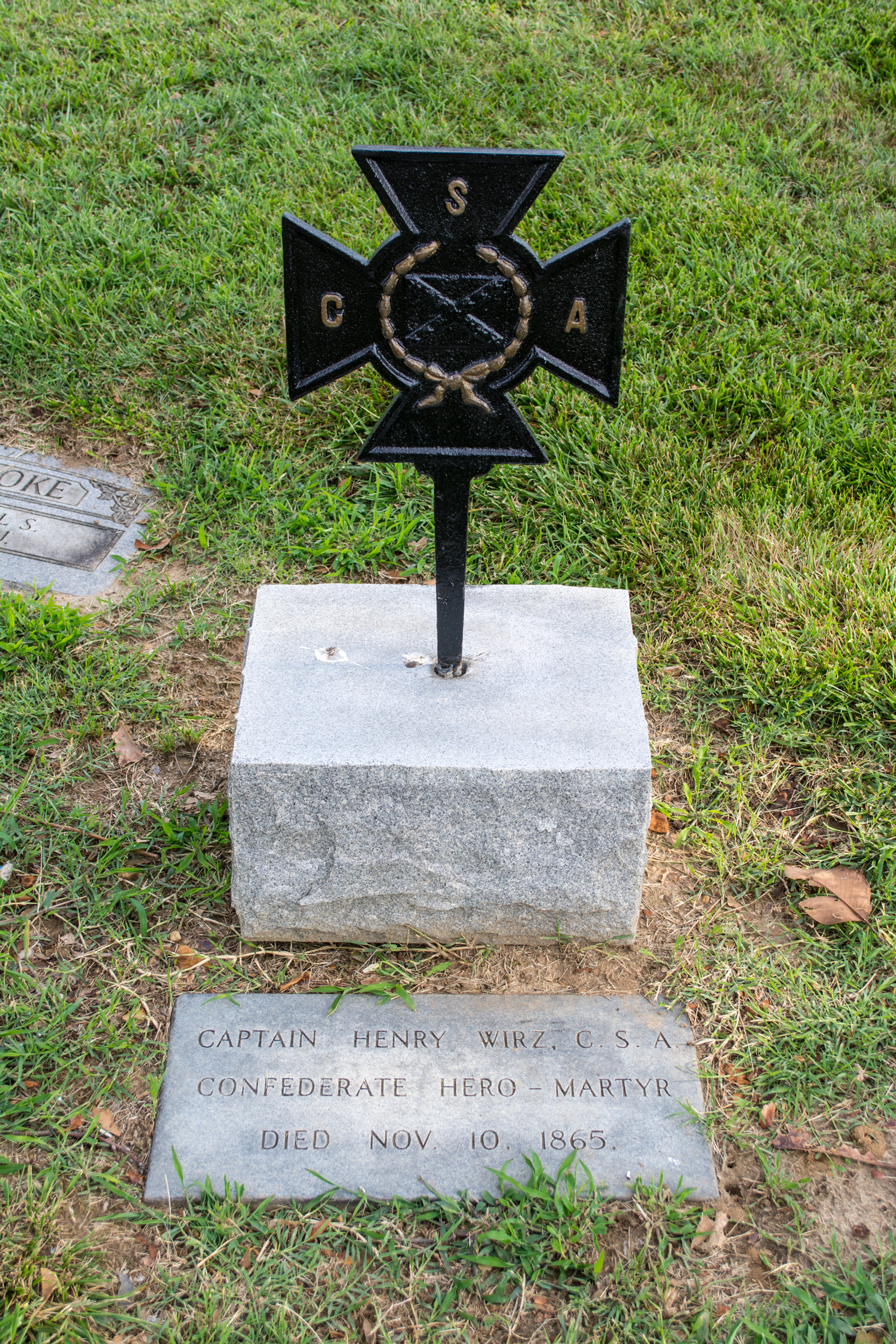
Wirz's grave marker at Mount Olivet Cemetery, denoting him as a hero and a martyr

Wirz was hanged at 10:32 a.m. on November 10, 1865, at the Old Capitol Prison in Washington D.C., located next to the U.S. Capitol. His neck did not break from the fall, and the crowd of 200 spectators guarded by 120 soldiers watched as he writhed and slowly strangled. Wirz was buried in the Mount Olivet Cemetery in Washington, D.C.

Wirz was one of only three men tried, convicted, and executed for war crimes during the Civil War (and, being a captain, was the highest-ranked of any executed), the others being Confederate guerrillas Champ Ferguson and Henry C. Magruder. Confederate soldiers Robert Cobb Kennedy, Sam Davis, and John Yates Beall were executed for spying; Marcellus Jerome Clarke was executed for being a guerrilla; and Andrew Laypole (also known as Isadore or Andre T. Leopold) was executed for spying, being a guerilla, and murder.

In 1869, Schade received permission from President Johnson to rebury Wirz's body, which had been buried at the Washington Arsenal alongside the Lincoln assassins. While the body was being transferred, it was discovered that the right arm, and parts of the neck and head, had been removed during autopsy. As of the late 1990s, the National Museum of Health and Medicine still had two of his vertebrae.

== Controversy ==
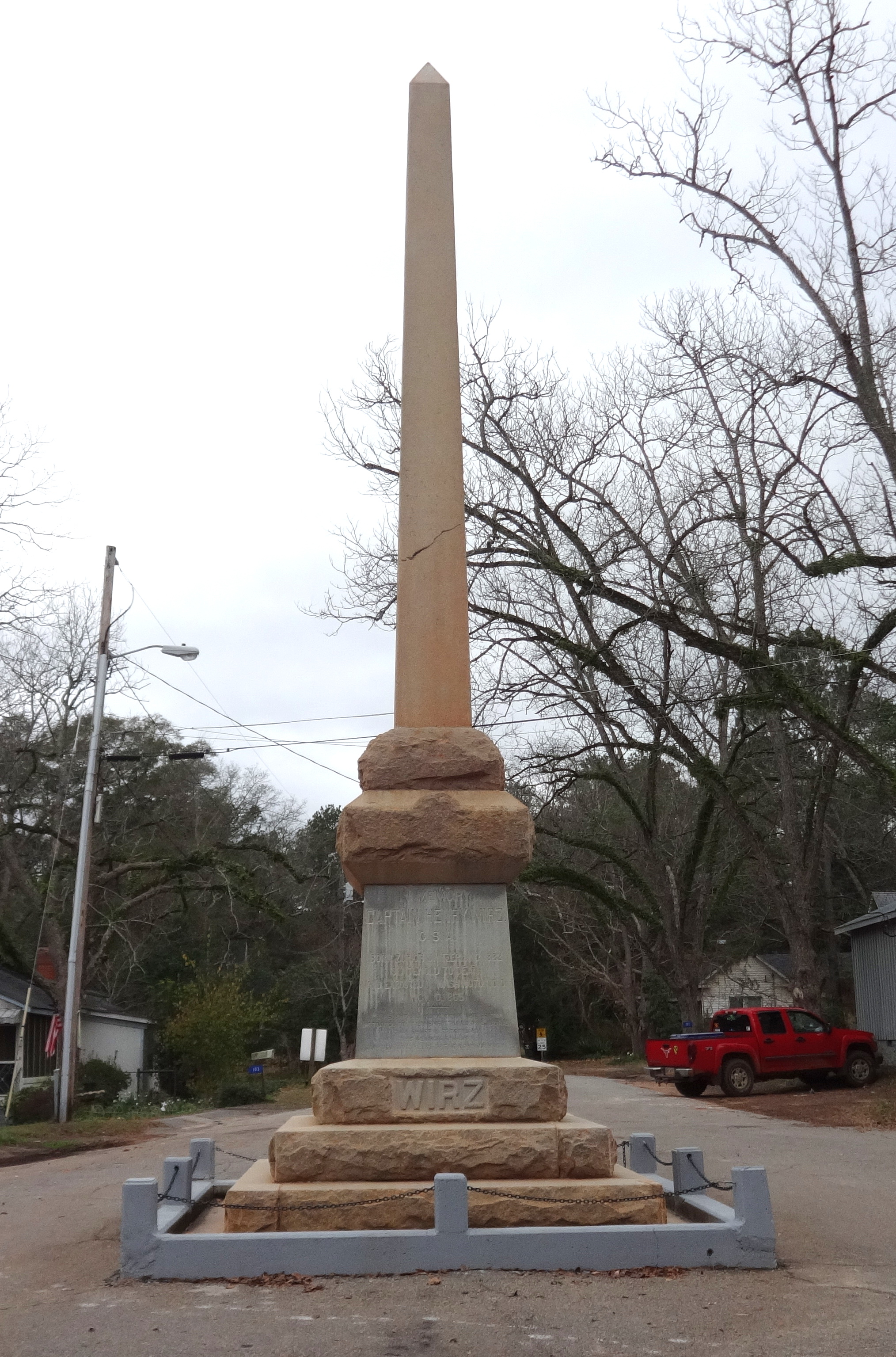
The Wirz Monument in Andersonville

The Wirz controversy grew out of the questions remaining after his trial pertaining to guilt and responsibility for multiple deaths of prisoners of war in camps on both sides following suspension of the Dix-Hill Cartel prisoner exchange agreement in July 1863.

The Grand Army of the Republic, the United Confederate Veterans, Sons of Confederate Veterans (SCV), and the United Daughters of the Confederacy (UDC), among others, evoked sad memories of Civil War prisoners portraying Wirz either a villain, or a martyr-hero, thus further contributing to the disputation. From 1899 to 1916, sixteen states erected monuments dedicated to Camp Sumter's prisoners. In response, the United Daughters of the Confederacy initiated a construction of a monument honoring Henry Wirz in Andersonville, Georgia. This monument was initially met with disgust from some Georgians. In 1958, the Georgia legislature refused to provide money for its repair; the representative who defeated the bill, whose great-uncle had been a Confederate prison guard at Andersonville, cited his family's memory of the "horror" inflicted by Wirz onto the prisoners.

Nevertheless, the monument became central to Wirz's remembrance. Every year the UDC and SCV hold a memorial service at the monument. Until recently, SCV annually marched to Wirz's memorial in Andersonville along with supporters of a congressional pardon for him. The SCV posthumously awarded Wirz their Confederate Medal of Honor, created in 1977.

During and after the trial Wirz was reviled in the court of public opinion as "The Demon of Andersonville". One controversy concerns a witness for the prosecution, Felix de la Baume, who was actually Felix Oesser, a deserter from the 7th New York Volunteers (Steuben) regiment. According to the National Park Service, de la Baume was definitely a prisoner at Andersonville and it is a myth that he was a key witness at the trial.

After time passed, some writers suggested Wirz's tribunal was unjust, stating that "Wirz did not receive a fair trial. Nevertheless, he was found guilty and sentenced to death." In 1980, one historian referred to Wirz as a "scapegoat." Wirz's conviction remains controversial.

Despite the surrounding controversy, the Wirz trial was one of the nation's significant early war crimes tribunals, creating enduring moral and legal notions and established the precedent that certain wartime behavior is unacceptable, regardless if committed under the orders of superiors or on one's own.

== In popular culture ==
Wirz is an important character in MacKinlay Kantor's Pulitzer Prize-winning novel Andersonville (1955), introduced in the third chapter during his mission to France in October 1863. In Saul Levitt's 1959 play The Andersonville Trial, Wirz was first played by Herbert Berghof. When the play was recreated for an episode of PBS's 1970–71 season of Hollywood Television Theatre, Wirz was portrayed by Richard Basehart. Wirz was portrayed by the Czech actor Jan Tříska in the American film Andersonville (1996). Wirz was portrayed by Stevo Žigon in the Yugoslav TV film Andersonvil - Logor smrti [sh] (1975), an adaptation of Saul Levitt's 1959 play.

== See also ==
- Camp Douglas (Chicago) – Civil War camp in Illinois
- Concentration Camps – Imprisonment or confinement of groups of people without trial
- Fort Delaware – Fort in Delaware, United States
- Elmira Prison – US Civil War POW camp in New York State
- Libby Prison – Military prison in Richmond, Virginia, during the US Civil War
