= Saul Levitt =

American dramatist

Saul Levitt (March 13, 1911 – September 30, 1977) was an American playwright and author, best known for his successful play The Andersonville Trial, based on MacKinlay Kantor's Pulitzer-Prize-winning novel Andersonville. Levitt's play was later made into an Emmy award-winning movie.

== Career ==
Levitt was born in New York City and died of heart failure on September 30, 1977.

Levitt served with the United States Army Air Corps in World War II as a B-17 bomber crewman with the 100th Bomb Group, flying missions against the Third Reich out of Thorpe Abbotts, UK. Early in his tour, he was severely injured in a traffic accident and was transferred to the reporting staff of Yank magazine, where he wrote and published a number of articles about his group's experiences flying and fighting in the war.

== Works ==
- The Sun is Silent (1951)
- The Andersonville Trial (1960)
- The True Glory (1945)
- A Covenant with Death (1967)
- The Trial of the Catonsville Nine (1972)

== Awards ==
- Primetime Emmy Award for Outstanding Writing Achievement in Drama - Adaptation for: The Andersonville Trial (1970) (TV)
