= Andersonville (novel) =

1955 novel by MacKinlay Kantor

- First edition cover
- Author: MacKinlay Kantor
- Language: English
- Genre: Historical novel
- Publisher: World Publishing Company
- Publication date: October 27, 1955
- Publication place: United States
- Media type: Print (Hardback & Paperback)
- Pages: 767
- ISBN: 0-452-26956-3

Andersonville is a novel by American writer MacKinlay Kantor concerning the Confederate prisoner of war camp Andersonville prison during the American Civil War (1861–1865). The novel was originally published in 1955, and won the Pulitzer Prize for Fiction the following year.

Kantor's novel was not the basis for a 1996 John Frankenheimer film Andersonville. Although Kantor sold the motion picture rights of his novel to one of the major Hollywood studios in the 1950s, it was never produced. Kantor's novel and the movie of the same name are two separate properties.

== Plot summary ==
The novel interweaves the stories of real and fictional characters. It is told from many points of view, including that of Henry Wirz, the camp commandant, who was later executed. It also features William Collins, a Union soldier and one of the leaders of the "Raiders". The "Raiders" are a gang of thugs, mainly bounty jumpers, who steal from their fellow prisoners and lead comfortable lives, while other prisoners die of starvation and disease. Other characters include numerous ordinary prisoners of war, the camp physician/doctor, a nearby plantation owner, guards and Confederate civilians in the area near the prison.

Andersonville is clearly based on prisoner memoirs, most notably Andersonville: A Story of Rebel Military Prisons by John McElroy. Henry Wirz, who received an injury earlier in the war and never recovered properly, is portrayed not as an inhuman fiend but as a sick man struggling with a job beyond his capacities.

== Characters in Andersonville ==
Historical figures who appear as characters in the novel include:

- Henry Wirz (Confederate, camp commandant)
- John McElroy (Union prisoner, future memoir writer)
- William Collins (Union prisoner, "Raider" leader executed by fellow prisoners)
- Boston Corbett (Union prisoner, future killer of John Wilkes Booth)
- John Winder (Confederate general in charge of prisoners-of-war)
- John L. Ransom (1843–1919) (Union prisoner), a printer from Jackson, Michigan, who kept a detailed diary of his capture, imprisonment, and escape. This was published as Andersonville Diary.
- Robert Hall Chilton (Confederate Inspector General in Richmond who received reports from Field Surgeons, and consequently wondered, in print, about the judgment of history if the abominations at Andersonville remained uncorrected)

== Criticism ==
The novel was frequently challenged by school board members due to its use of vulgar and obscene language. In 1967, the father of an Amherst High School student claimed that the book was "1 percent history and 99 percent filth" and could not be read by his daughter and called for the dismissal of the teacher who had assigned the book to her class. It was later decided not to remove the book from the optional reading list.

Andersonville was also banned from four Amarillo, Texas high schools and Amarillo College.

== Bibliography ==
Commager, Henry Steele. "The Last Full Measure of Devotion: A Novel of an Infamous Prison in the Civil War", The New York Times Book Review. Oct. 30, 1955. VII, p. 1.

Cullen, Jim. The Civil War in Popular Culture. Smithsonian Institution Press, Washington: 1995.

Hesseltine, William B. "Andersonville Revisited." The Georgia Review, 1956, p 92-100.

Kantor, Mackinlay. "The Last Full Measure of Devotion: The Author Tells How He Relived the Tragedy", The New York Times Book Review. Oct. 30, 1955. VII, p. 1.

Kantor, Mackinlay, Andersonville. Penguin Books USA, Inc., New York : 1955.

Poore, Charles. "Andersonville (Review)." The New York Times. Oct. 27, 1955, p. 31:4.

Stuckey, W. J. The Pulitzer Prize Novels : A Critical Backward Look. University of Oklahoma Press, Norman: 1981.
