= Edwin L. Stanton =

American politician (1842–1877)

Edwin Stanton
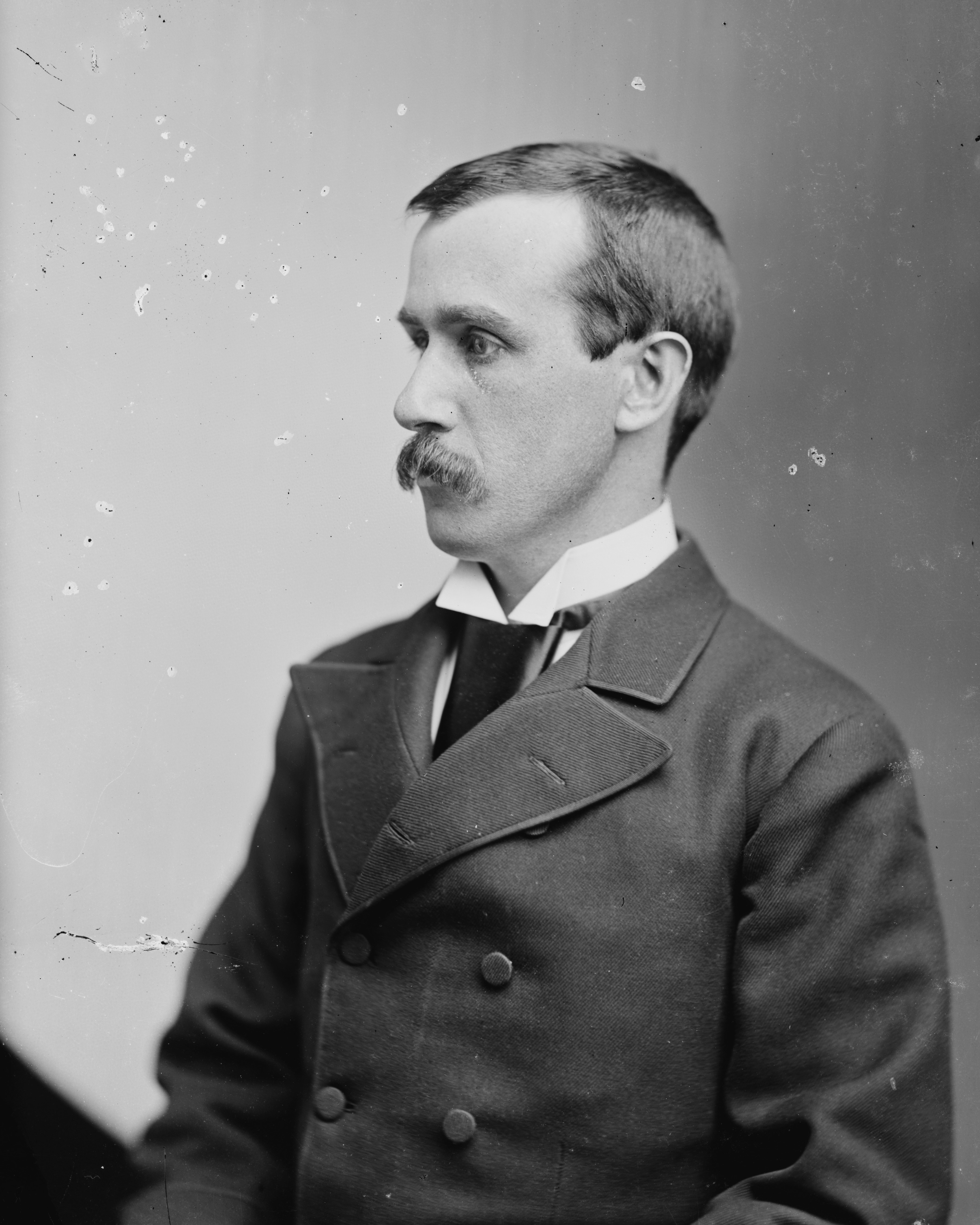
- Portrait of Stanton, c. 1870s

Attorney for the District of Columbia
- In office July 3, 1874 – October 31, 1876
- President: William Dennison Jr. (de facto)
- Preceded by: William Cook
- Succeeded by: William Birney

Secretary of the District of Columbia
- In office 1871–1873
- Governor: Henry D. Cooke
- Preceded by: Norton P. Chipman
- Succeeded by: Richard Harrington

Personal details
- Born: Edwin Lamson Stanton; August 12, 1842 Steubenville, Ohio, U.S.
- Died: August 29, 1877 (aged 35) Washington, D.C., U.S.
- Resting place: Union Cemetery-Beatty Park
- Party: Republican
- Spouse: Tennie Wilkins Carr (m. 1874)
- Relatives: Edwin Stanton (father)
- Education: Kenyon College (BA)

Edwin Lamson Stanton (August 12, 1842 – August 29, 1877) was an American lawyer and politician. A native of Steubenville, Ohio, he was the son of Edwin Stanton and his first wife, Mary.

After the American Civil War, Stanton established himself as a lawyer in Washington, D.C., and he was appointed as Secretary of the District of Columbia by Republican president Ulysses S. Grant in 1871. In 1874, Grant appointed Stanton as city attorney of the District of Columbia.

== Childhood and family ==
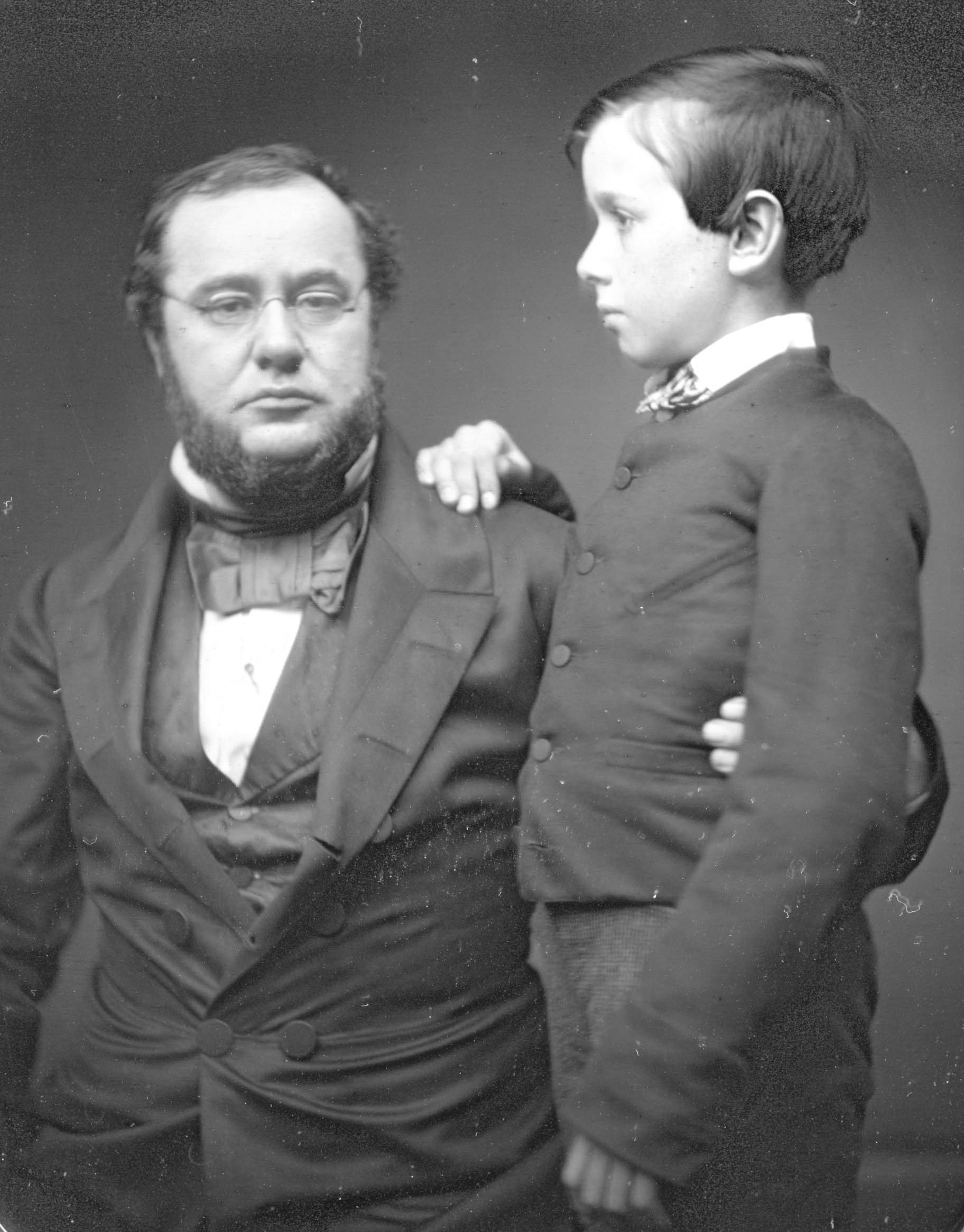
Stanton with his father, c. 1853

=== Early life and education ===
Stanton was born in Steubenville, Ohio on August 12, 1842, the second child of Edwin McMasters Stanton, then a local attorney, and Mary (Lamson) Stanton. His birth brought joy to the household after his elder sister, Lucy, had died of an unknown illness the previous year, but the happiness was short-lived, as Stanton's mother died in March 1844. Though devastated by the loss of his wife, Stanton's father later remarried and moved to Washington, D.C., where he established himself in legal and political circles, eventually being appointed United States Attorney General by James Buchanan and Secretary of War by Buchanan's successor, Abraham Lincoln.

Stanton attended Kenyon College, his father's alma mater, and graduated as valedictorian in 1863.

=== Marriage ===
Stanton became engaged to Matilda Wilkins "Tennie" Carr, a maternal granddaughter of William Wilkins, in late 1874. The couple married on November 3 of that year, at St. Stephen's Episcopal Church in Philadelphia.

== Career ==
In 1863, when Stanton graduated from Kenyon College, the American Civil War was at its height. He returned to Washington to serve as a secretary under his father at the United States War Department.

Stanton was admitted to the bar of the District of Columbia in January 1868 and began practicing law. His father was nominated by President Ulysses S. Grant in late 1869 to serve as an associate justice of the Supreme Court of the United States and was confirmed by the U.S. Senate but died before he could take office. Meanwhile, the younger Stanton was made counsel of the Baltimore and Potomac Railroad.

Shortly after the passing of the District of Columbia Organic Act of 1871, which established a new municipal government in Washington, D.C., Stanton was appointed by President Grant to serve as Secretary of the District of Columbia. Norton P. Chipman, who was the first to be given the position, stepped down after 50 days to serve as the District's first non-voting delegate to the United States House of Representatives. Stanton served until his resignation in 1873.

In 1874, Stanton again took up public office when he was appointed Attorney for the District of Columbia (predecessor to the office of Attorney General for the District of Columbia) and served until 1876.

== Death ==
Stanton died on August 29, 1877, at his residence on Rhode Island Avenue, after a short illness. Following services at the Church of the Epiphany in Washington, his remains were temporarily brought to Oak Hill Cemetery, after which they were transported to Steubenville, Ohio for burial alongside his mother and sister at Union Cemetery.

He is the namesake of Stanton Elementary School, run by the District of Columbia Public Schools.

Political offices
| Preceded by Norton P. Chipman | Secretary of the District of Columbia; 1871–1873 | Succeeded by Richard Harrington |
Legal offices
| Preceded by William Cook | Attorney for the District of Columbia; 1874–1876 | Succeeded by William Birney |
