= Spirit Lake (book) =

1961 novel by MacKinlay Kantor

- Author: MacKinlay Kantor
- Language: English
- Genre: Historical fiction
- Published: 1961
- Publisher: World
- Publication place: USA
- Pages: 957

Spirit Lake is a 1961 novel by MacKinlay Kantor. It is set in Iowa during the era of Manifest Destiny, and depicts the epoch through a patchwork of numerous characters, families, and factions. The book comes to a climax with the Spirit Lake Massacre.
