= Lee and Grant at Appomattox =

1950 novel by MacKinlay Kantor

- Cover of the first edition
- Author: MacKinlay Kantor
- Illustrator: Donald McKay
- Language: English
- Series: Landmark Book Series
- Subject: The surrender of General Lee to General Grant near the end of the American Civil War
- Genre: Historical fiction, Children's literature
- Publisher: Random House
- Publication date: 1950
- Publication place: United States of America
- Pages: 175
- ISBN: 1-4027-5124-9 (Sterling Point paperback edition)
- OCLC: 123119374
- Dewey Decimal: 973.7/38 22
- LC Class: E477.67 .K36 2007

Lee and Grant at Appomattox is a historical fiction children's novel by MacKinlay Kantor. It was originally published in 1950 by Random House, and later published in paperback by Sterling Point Books.

== Plot ==
Lee and Grant at Appomattox depicts the surrender of the Confederate States of America to Union soldiers. In specific, it portrays the surrender of General Robert E. Lee to General Ulysses S. Grant at Appomattox Court House, helping to bring about the end of the American Civil War. Kantor mainly discusses the feelings of each army, both victorious and shellacked, and pays special attention to the history and interaction between Grant and Lee. The story also addresses the lasting bitterness between the North and South for years following the Civil War.

== Characters ==
- General Ulysses S. Grant – Grant is displayed disingenuously, as a "'silent, shabby, stubborn' man who liked animals more than people". Grant was further portrayed as a man who needlessly squandered the lives of hundreds of men in bloody battle. Ultimately, though, Grant is portrayed as a fair man, who lets the Confederates keep the items pertinent to their livelihood.
- General Robert E. Lee – General Lee is portrayed as stately, and, as essayist Gallager said, knightly and religiously. In fact, Kantor speaks very highly of Lee in a number of passages, for example: "You could imagine him [Lee] in the wars of long ago, in polished armor. You could imagine him in the wars of Biblical times, proud of his chariot, fascinating the Philistines".

== Literary significance and reception ==
Historian William Marvel has cited the book as piquing his interest in studying the subject of Appomattox as a child. Some have accused the book of displaying a bias towards General Lee and presenting an inaccurate portrayal of General Grant.

== References to history ==
The Appomattox Court House was the site of the actual surrender of General Lee to General Grant in 1865. The story makes reference to many actual battles of the Civil War.

=== References in other works ===
Gary Gallagher mentions the book in his collection of essays Lee and His Generals in War and Memory as an example of southern hypocrisy dictating how the memories of Lee and Grant are recalled. William Marvel named the book as a childhood influence in his book A Place Called Appomattox.
