= Norton P. Chipman =

Union Army general (1835–1924)

Norton Chipman
- Chipman c. 1860–1865

Delegate to the U.S. House of Representatives from the District of Columbia's at-large district
- In office April 21, 1871 – March 3, 1875
- Preceded by: Constituency established
- Succeeded by: Constituency abolished

Secretary of the District of Columbia
- In office March 2, 1871 – April 21, 1871
- Governor: Henry D. Cooke
- Preceded by: Position established
- Succeeded by: Edwin L. Stanton

Personal details
- Born: Norton Parker Chipman; March 7, 1834 Milford Center, Ohio, U.S.
- Died: February 1, 1924 (aged 89) San Francisco, California, U.S.
- Party: Republican
- Spouse: Mary Holmes
- Children: 2
- Education: Washington College (attended); University of Cincinnati (LLB)

Norton Parker Chipman (March 7, 1834 – February 1, 1924) was an American Civil War army officer, military prosecutor, politician, author, and judge.

== Biography ==
=== Early years ===
Born in Milford Center, Ohio, to Vermont-natives Norman and Sarah Wilson (Parker) Chipman, Norton Chipman's family moved to Iowa when he was young. He graduated from the Cincinnati Law School in 1859, prior to the school's merger with the University of Cincinnati in its present form.

=== Military career ===
Having enlisted in the Union Army's Second Iowa Infantry during the Civil War, Lieutenant Colonel Chipman fought courageously in battle and was nearly mortally wounded and carried off the battlefield, leading his commanders to report him as dead at the Battle of Fort Donelson. Chipman did, in fact, survive and, upon recovery, was promoted to the rank of colonel in 1862. Chipman and fellow Ohioan Ulysses S. Grant fought together in the Battle of Fort Donelson, which became Grant's first major victory. Chipman was later appointed as a member of General Henry W. Halleck's and then Samuel R. Curtis's staff. He later became a member of the Judge Advocate General's staff.

=== Life in the District of Columbia ===
By 1864, he had moved to Washington, D.C., to work at the War Department under Secretary Edwin M. Stanton. Chipman successfully prosecuted Captain Henry Wirz, the commander of the Confederacy's infamous Andersonville prison camp, where almost 13,000 Union soldiers lost their lives. For his cruelties to prisoners of war and eleven homicides, Wirz was hanged in 1865. Chipman published his recollections of the famous Andersonville Trial in his 1911 book, The Tragedy of Andersonville.

After the Civil War, Chipman was appointed Secretary of the District of Columbia by President Ulysses S. Grant, and was later elected to Congress as a delegate from the District of Columbia, serving two terms.

While adjutant general of the Grand Army of the Republic (GAR), he received a note from a friend in Cincinnati. The note suggested that the United States mimic the European custom of decorating graves of people who died while serving in the military. Chipman loved the idea, and he decided the day should be late in the spring, in order to make sure mature flowers were available. Because May 31 fell on a Sunday that year, he declared May 30, 1868, to be Decoration Day, a day to decorate the graves of fallen soldiers from the Civil War. The Associated Press published the order around the country. Decoration Day later became Memorial Day.

This myth that Chipman initiated the order creating Memorial Day appears to originate from the 1889 History of the Grand Army of the Republic by Robert Burns Beath, published three years after General John A. Logan’s death. It is one of many hoaxes deemed apocryphal by Bellware and Gardiner in The Genesis of the Memorial Day Holiday in America. In their book, Bellware and Gardiner note that Logan spoke to a group of veterans on July 4, 1866, mentioning the various Southern tributes that occurred that Spring. No one, including Mrs. Logan, Martha Kimball or Norton Chipman (who each claimed to have originated the idea) had to inform Logan about these tributes in 1868, as he became well aware of them two years earlier. Beath actually implies that this order was, instead, an adoption of a Southern custom as the holiday was “generally observed … in the Southern states.” As Adjutant General, Chipman's name appeared along with Logan, the GAR's Commander-in-Chief, on his famous 1868 Order No. 11 published in newspapers across the country. However, Logan never credited Chipman or any of the others with originating the idea. Bellware and Gardiner credit Mary Ann Williams and the Ladies Memorial Association of Columbus, Georgia as the true originators of the holiday as abundant contemporaneous evidence from across the nation exists to substantiate the claim.

When Grant was elected president in 1868, Chipman was asked to be on the presidential inaugural committee. At the time, Chipman was living on the corner of First and B streets southeast. After Congress passed the District of Columbia Organic Act of 1871, Chipman was appointed Secretary of the District of Columbia, effectively the second highest local official after the Governor of the District of Columbia. Chipman held this position for 50 days, until Edward L. Stanton was appointed to replace him. At the time, Chipman was living at 1725 G Street NW, and he had recently founded the law firm of Chipman, Hosmer & Co., located at Sixth and F streets NW.

Chipman spoke at a Republican nominating convention on March 7, 1871, where he said, "If there was anybody here who didn't want his children placed in mixed schools he had better take them out of the District of Columbia." The statement was drawn out of Chipman after persistent questioning from someone in the crowd, and it caused quite a stir, considering that Republicans generally avoided committing on the subject of school integration in order to not alienate moderate white Republicans. Due to his friendship with Grant, name recognition, longer residency in the District, and his connection to the District's government, the convention decided to nominate Chipman over Frederick Douglass to be the Republican nominee for the District of Columbia's first delegate to Congress. While campaigning, Republicans advocated for long-time District resident Chipman over Democratic candidate Richard T. Merrick, who they said owned no property in the District. This argument backfired when it was revealed that Chipman had sold his home and was living at a hotel, while Merrick actually did own real estate in the District. During the April general election, Chipman won, receiving 15,196 votes to Merrick's 11,104. Republicans won fifteen of the twenty-two members of the District's House of Delegates as well.

Now living on B Street SE, Chipman spent much of his time in Congress advocating for the District's public works program. Among the bills he submitted to Congress was a bill to appropriate 2,500,000 acres of land to build schools, a bill to appropriate $200,000 to complete construction of the Washington Monument, and a bill to build a new bridge over the Anacostia River, a bill to improve the Washington harbor. When Congressman Robert Roosevelt sharply criticized the District's board of public works, calling it rife with fraud and corruption, Chipman fiercely defended the board, saying Roosevelt's charges were based on willful misinformation and false accounts.

Running for reelection in 1873, he defeated Democrat L.G. Hine, formerly of the District's Board of Aldermen, receiving 12,443 votes to Hine's 7,042.

In 1874, Chipman submitted a bill to annex Georgetown to the City of Washington and to rename its streets to conform to Washington's street-naming conventions. He also tried to require the federal government to pay the District government property tax for the federal buildings located in the District.

In 1875, Congress disestablished the District's territorial government including Chipman's position of delegate.

=== Later years ===
Chipman c. 1904

Chipman moved to Red Bluff, California in 1876, where he served as a member of the California State Board of Trade, eventually becoming its president. He served as a supreme court commissioner in California from 1897 to 1905. Finally, he was appointed by California's governor George Pardee as the first presiding justice of the newly created California Third District Court of Appeal, a position he held from 1906 until 1921, when he resigned due to failing health.

He died on February 1, 1924, in San Francisco at the age of 89. He is interred in Bellefontaine Cemetery in St. Louis, Missouri. A small memorial remains in the library of the California Third District Court of Appeal in Sacramento. Chipman is the second longest-serving presiding justice of the court. In April 2006, the Federalist Society of Chipman's alma mater, the University of Cincinnati College of Law, officially honored Chipman, renaming its local chapter the "Norton Parker Chipman Federalist Society for Law and Public Policy Studies at the University of Cincinnati College of Law."

== Personal life ==
Chipman married Mary Isabel Holmes (1846–1919) in 1865 while stationed in St. Louis, Missouri. They had two children: Robert Holmes (1865–1866) and Alice Helen.

== Quotes ==
I confess. I weary of this contest year after year to obtain simple justice for the District of Columbia. I weary of the indifference of Congress... I weary of the abject dependence of this community and the position of obsequiousness which their agent must submit to lest he offend some congressional propriety or step upon some congressional toe...

— speech to Congress, 1875

Nothing can be more clear, upon a cursory view of the local government and its relations to the parent Government, than that the United States have never acted upon any well-defined theory, or with any consistency or unity; that while it has been just—indeed, almost generous—in certain directions, it has been parsimonious and mean in others... What is needed above all things here is a consistent, well-defined policy on the part of Congress in the support of this District government.

— speech to Congress

== In popular culture ==
The story of the Andersonville trial and Chipman's role in bringing Wirz to justice inspired the Emmy Award-winning film The Andersonville Trial (1970), directed by George C. Scott. In the film, William Shatner played the protagonist Chipman (Scott had played the role in the original Broadway production), Richard Basehart played Wirz, Jack Cassidy played lead defense attorney Otis Baker and Martin Sheen played a minor supporting role.

== See also ==
Political offices
New office	Secretary of the District of Columbia; 1871	Succeeded by Edwin L. Stanton
U.S. House of Representatives
New constituency	Delegate to the U.S. House of Representatives from the District of Columbia's at-large congressional district 1871–1875	Constituency abolished
