= Louis F. Schade =

American lawyer and newspaper editor

Louis Frederick Schade
- Born: April 4, 1829; Berlin, Province of Brandenburg, Kingdom of Prussia
- Died: February 25, 1903 (aged 73); Washington, D.C., United States
- Occupations: Lawyer and newspaper editor
- Known for: Defense of Confederate Major Henry Wirz for war crimes committed during the American Civil War

Louis Frederick Schade (April 4, 1829 – February 25, 1903) was a German-American lawyer and newspaper editor who was prominent in political and social circles of Washington, D.C., in the United States. He is most famous for defending Confederate States of America Captain Henry Wirz in a war crimes trial in 1865. Wirz was condemned to death for his supervision of the (Camp Sumter) prisoner-of-war camp.

== Early life and career ==
Louis Schade was born on April 4, 1829, to Friedrich and Wilhelmina (née von Sydow) Schade in Berlin in what was then the Province of Brandenburg in the Kingdom of Prussia. He studied law and medicine at the Frederick William University in Berlin, graduating in 1848. He learned to speak four European languages fluently, and could translate another five. He participated in the Revolutions of 1848, erecting barricades in the streets, and was sentenced to death for his role in the revolution. He then fled the country for the United States in 1851.

Schade briefly lived in Weehawken, New Jersey, with German friends, but settled in Washington, D.C., where he worked as a correspondent for several foreign-language newspapers from 1851 to 1853. In 1853, he joined the Smithsonian Institution as an assistant librarian. He moved to the United States Census Bureau in 1854. His 1856 monograph, The Immigration Into the United States of America, From a Statistical and National-Economical Point of View, was a highly influential treatise on the benefits of immigration. Seeking more income, he joined the United States Department of State in 1855 as a translator and statistician.

== Political work ==
In the United States, Schade was a prominent Forty-Eighter and very active in Democratic politics. Stephen A. Douglas, the Democratic Senator from Illinois, was impressed with his writing and political work, and in 1856 persuaded Schade to edit two newspapers he owned in Chicago, the English-language National Union and the German-language National Demokrat. In 1858, at the behest of Democratic National Committee chairman Charles Faulkner, he took a temporary leave of absence from his newspaper duties to campaign for Douglas in Illinois and Senator George Wallace Jones in Iowa. While on these trips, he was admitted to the bar association at Burlington, Iowa, in 1858. He returned to his editorial position after the election was over, an ardent Douglas supporter. He again campaigned for Douglas in the presidential election of 1860, which Douglas lost to Abraham Lincoln.

Schade was a strong supporter of the Union prior to and during the American Civil War. He was not, however, an abolitionist. In 1860, Schade published a pro-slavery book titled A Book for the 'Impending Crisis'! Appeal to the Common Sense and Patriotism of People of the United States; Helperism Annihilated! The 'Irrepressible Conflict' and Its Consequences!, in which he attacked Hinton Rowan Helper's economic studies which depicted slavery as an economic drag on the Deep South. Schade's book was also an anti-abolitionist tract. This work, the first book-length study of the Haitian Revolution of 1791-1804 in almost a half-century, gruesomely depicted the depredations of black ex-slaves on the white population of Haiti, and predicted that African American slaves would visit the same horrors on their former masters if slavery were abolished in America.

After the election was over, Schade returned to Washington, D.C., in late 1860, where he took up the practice of law. He also lobbied Congress on behalf of the United States Brewers' Association.

== The Wirz trial ==
In August 1865, Schade joined the legal team defending Confederate States Army Major Henry Wirz. Wirz was the former commandant of the Confederacy's Camp Sumter prisoner-of-war (POW) camp (commonly referred to as "Andersonville Prison", after a nearby town). Wirz was accused of conspiracy to injure the health of his prisoners, conspiracy to commit murder, torture, ordering guards to commit murder, allowing dogs to maul prisoners as a means of punishment, and personally committing murder on 13 separate occasions. Although the list of co-conspirators originally included former Confederate President Jefferson Davis and 12 others, by the time the trial started only Wirz was prosecuted. Wirz, a Swiss émigré of German background, was initially represented by James Hughes (former judge with the United States Court of Claims and former member of the United States House of Representatives), James W. Denver (former Territorial Governor of Kansas, former member of the House, and former Brigadier General of Volunteers in the Union Army), Charles F. Peck (an attorney from Illinois), and Schade, all of whom volunteered on or about August 20, 1865, to represent him. Hughes, Denver, and Peck withdrew from the trial on its first day, outraged at lack of fairness exhibited by the military tribunal and their lack of time to prepare the defense. Schade, however, remained as counsel. On the third day of the trial, local attorney Otis H. Baker joined him as co-counsel. After their pretrial motions and pleadings were denied by the court, Schade and Baker attempted to resign as legal counsel. Wirz pleaded with them to remain, and they agreed to do so.

The prosecution, whose presentation lasted until October 18, argued that the lack of shelter (Andersonville was 26.5 acres (107,000 m^{2}) of bare ground, fenced with barbed wire), food, medical care, and clothing was Wirz's responsibility as commandant of the camp. The severe punishments meted out were also due to his orders. Schade's defense was that Wirz provided the best possible care for the POWs, given the huge influx of prisoners, the complete lack of food and supplies given to his troops, and the severe shortage of both physicians and guards. Schade and Baker faced extreme difficulties during the trial. Any attempt to impugn the character of prosecution witnesses was ruled slander by the court. The defense was forced to rely on the Union Army to serve subpoenas and force witnesses to testify, which it allegedly did only in some cases (only 32 of 100 subpoenaed defense witnesses testified). Union Army soldiers were denied the opportunity to testify on Wirz's behalf. The court prevented Schade and Baker from delivering a summation, and ordered a court reporter to do so in their stead.

Wirz was found guilty on almost all charges. Schade pleaded with President Andrew Johnson for clemency. Johnson granted him an audience, although it was not a private one, and accepted a letter from Schade outlining the grounds for clemency. Aside from complaints about the military tribunal's behavior and the enumeration of hundreds of legal errors, Schade argued that Wirz was dying and would not live more than a few months. Johnson denied clemency, and Wirz was hanged on November 10, 1865.

Schade won a national reputation for his defense of Wirz, even though the defense ended in failure. After Wirz's death, Schade said that unnamed men had approached Wirz, Schade, and Wirz's Catholic priest, Father Francis E. Boyle, on the night before Wirz's death. These men offered to have Wirz's sentence commuted to life in prison if Wirz would implicated Jefferson Davis in the Andersonville crimes. Wirz, Schade, said, declined. On April 4, 1867, Schade published an "open letter to the American people" in several major newspapers, in which he delineated the legal failings of the Wirz trial and declared his client innocent.

=== Wirz reburial ===
Schade also campaigned to have Wirz given a proper burial. After his death, Wirz was buried alongside the Lincoln assassination conspirators (John Wilkes Booth, Mary Surratt, Lewis Powell, George Atzerodt, and David Herold) along the south wall of the prison courtyard at the Washington Arsenal (now Fort Lesley J. McNair). The War Department decided to tear down the portion of the arsenal where the bodies lay, and on October 1, 1867, the coffins were disinterred and reburied in the basement of Warehouse No. 1 at the Arsenal. Schade, the Surratt family, and the Booth family had long asked that the remains of their loved ones be turned over to them.

Schade was particularly outraged by what he believed was the desecration of Wirz's corpse. He publicly asserted that Wirz had not been buried, but rather that the United States Department of War put his body in an old wooden rifle crate and kept it in the basement of the War Department building. He also claimed Wirz's skull had been stolen by a U.S. Army soldier, and was on display at the Old Capitol Prison—where a soldier charged a fee to let people look at it.

After nearly four years, President Johnson agreed to turn the bodies over to Schade and the families. Wirz's body was released to Schade on February 24, 1869. When the body was disinterred, Schade was proven partially correct: Parts of the corpse were missing. U.S. Army surgeons conducted an autopsy on Wirz's body after his death. There had been claims that Wirz's neck did not snap when he was hanged, and that he'd strangled to death. Two neck vertebrae had been removed, and indeed proved that the neck had not broken. Schade and Baker had argued at trial that Wirz's right arm had been so incapacitated by a war wound that he could not have committed the murders he was accused of. After Wirz's death, surgeons also removed his right arm, which was in excellent condition and showed little of the damage witnesses claimed. Schade paid for a burial plot at Mount Olivet Cemetery in Washington, D.C., and Wirz was interred there on March 3, 1869. (The vertebrae and arm bones remain in the custody of the National Museum of Health and Medicine as of 2014.)

== Post-war life ==
Schade practiced law and remained active in politics in the nation's capital for the rest of his life. He became a professor of German language at Georgetown University, a position he held throughout the 1870s. He caused a major scandal in 1871 when he issued a public report accusing Secretary of War William W. Belknap of selling arms to France. President Ulysses S. Grant was forced to stop the sales.

In 1873, D.C. millionaire and Democratic Party stalwart William Wilson Corcoran provided Schade with the financial backing to found the Washington Sentinel. The first issue appeared on July 4, 1873. The newspaper was extremist in its support for the Democratic Party, radical in its call for a reduction in the size of government (which it saw infringing on civil liberties), violently opposed to the prohibition of alcohol, and an ardent advocate for lenient immigration policies. The newspaper also covered international events extensively, which was unusual at the time. Nonetheless, the paper's support for its pet policies was so extreme that its rival, the then-tiny Washington Post, called it "a scurrilous weekly sheet...to aid [Schade] in selling a patent beer-bung starter."

As editor and publisher of the Washington Sentinel, Schade played a critical role in bringing down Alexander Robey Shepherd. In 1871, Congress passed the District of Columbia Organic Act, which merged the various town, city, and county governments that controlled the District of Columbia into a single 11-member legislature led by a territorial governor. Shepherd (a Republican and close associate of President Grant's) was appointed to the new government's five-member Board of Public Works. Henry D. Cooke, the board's nominal chairman, let Shepherd run the board as he pleased. Shepherd made extensive civic improvements to the city, constructing its first sewer system, building and paving hundreds of miles of roads, laying gas pipelines, planting trees, demolishing unsightly structures (often illegally, and occasionally in the dead of night), installing street lights, building water mains, filling in the Washington City Canal, and creating an extensive streetcar system. Shepherd became Territorial Governor of the District of Columbia on September 13, 1873, and continued spending freely. But Shepherd's improvements to the city's infrastructure were so vast that he came close to bankrupting the city. Schade campaigned vigorously to have Shepherd removed from office, and printed numerous articles exposing Shepherd's excessive spending. An outraged Congress passed legislation abolishing the territorial government and replacing it with a "temporary" three-member commission (which lasted until 1973). Shepherd was removed from office on June 20, 1874, just nine months after taking office.

=== The Petersen House ===
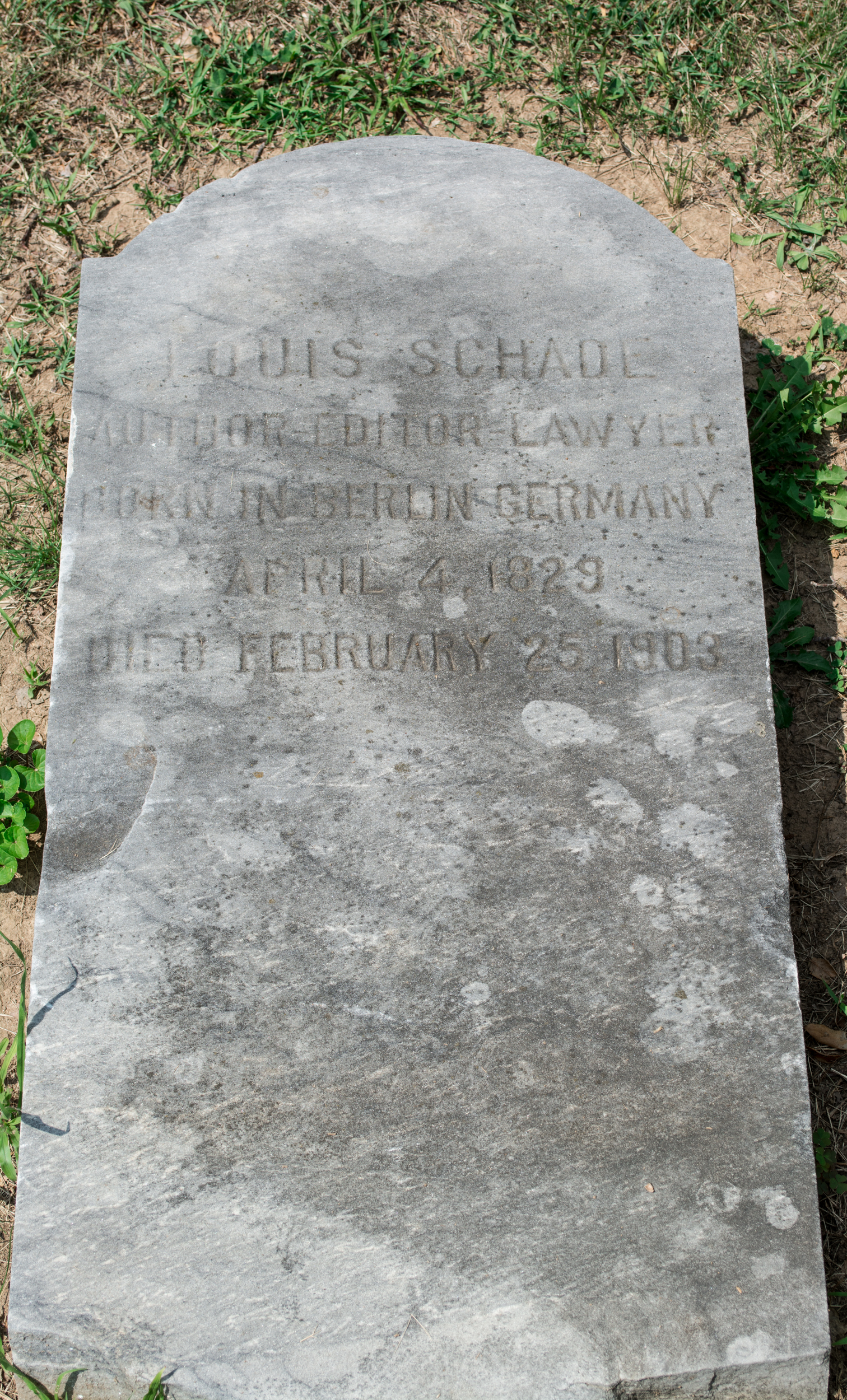
Grave of Louis F. Schade at Prospect Hill Cemetery.

In 1878, Louis Schade helped to preserve a critical piece of American history.

William A. Petersen was a German immigrant and tailor, and in 1849 he constructed a four-story townhouse at 516 10th Street NW in Washington, D.C. The house was directly across the street from the First Baptist Church of Washington. The congregation sold its structure to John T. Ford in 1861, who turned it into a theater named Ford's Athenaeum. It burned down in 1862, was rebuilt, and reopened as Ford's Theatre in August 1863. At about 10:30 p.m. on April 14, 1865, President Abraham Lincoln was shot in the head by John Wilkes Booth at Ford's Theatre. Lincoln was rushed across the street to the Petersen House, where he died at 7:22 a.m. the following morning. Petersen fell on hard financial times, and committed suicide on June 17, 1871.

Left destitute, the Petersen family sold the home. Recognizing its historic value, Scahde purchased the Petersen House on November 25, 1878, for $4,500 ($150,129 in 2025 dollars). The room where Lincoln died had long been cleared of any historic or valuable objects, so Schade used it as a playroom for his four children. Schade also renovated the house, and added rooms in the rear of the basement and the first floor and next to the stairway. The front room on the first floor was used as the main office of the Washington Sentinel. In 1883, Congress approved the placement of a plaque on the front of the house to commemorate the site of Lincoln's death.

The historic importance of the house led Schade to lease it to the Memorial Association of the District of Columbia in 1893. The organization opened a Lincoln museum on the site, and the Sentinel relocated its offices to a building at 804 E Street NW. The Memorial Association allowed collector Osborn Hamiline Oldroyd to live in the house rent-free in return for displaying his immense collection of Lincolniana and assassination artifacts in the home. The National Park Service purchased the Petersen House from Schade for $30,000 ($1,161,000 in 2025 dollars) in 1896.

== Death ==
For most of his life, while living in Washington, D.C., Louis Schade was a member of Concordia Church, a Lutheran church located at 20th and G Streets NW.

Schade suffered a stroke in 1900 which left him mostly paralyzed and confined to his home in Washington, D.C. He suffered a second stroke in 1902 that left him bedridden. He contracted pneumonia on February 21, 1903, and died at his home at 10:00 p.m. on February 25. He was interred at Prospect Hill Cemetery in Washington, D.C.

== Bibliography ==
- Allen, Felicity (1999). Jefferson Davis, Unconquerable Heart. Columbia, Mo.: University of Missouri Press. ISBN 0826212190. - Article on book: Jefferson Davis: Unconquerable Heart
- Clavin, Matthew J. (2010). Toussaint Louverture and the American Civil War: The Promise and Peril of a Second Haitian Revolution. Philadelphia: University of Pennsylvania Press. ISBN 9780812242058.
- Curran, Robert Emmett (1993). The Bicentennial History of Georgetown University: From Academy to University, 1789-1889. Washington, D.C.: Georgetown University Press. ISBN 0878404856.
- Dain, Bruce R. (2003). A Hideous Monster of the Mind: American Race Theory in the Early Republic. Cambridge, Mass.: Harvard University Press. ISBN 0674009460.
- Davis, Robert Scott (2006). Ghosts and Shadows of Andersonville: Essays on the Secret Social Histories of America's Deadliest Prison. Macon, Ga.: Mercer University Press. ISBN 9780881460124.
- Ford, Thomas W. (1981). A. B. Guthrie, Jr. Boston: Twayne Publishers. ISBN 0805773274.
- Gourley, Catherine (2010). The Horrors of Andersonville: Life and Death Inside a Civil War Prison. Minneapolis: Twenty-First Century Books. ISBN 9780761342120.
- Hatch, Frederick (2011). Protecting President Lincoln: The Security Effort, the Thwarted Plots, and the Disaster at Ford's Theatre. Jefferson, N.C.: McFarland & Co. ISBN 9780786463626.
- LaForce, Glen W. (June 1988). "The Trial of Major Henry Wirz—A National Disgrace". The Army Lawyer: 3–10.
- Laska, Lewis L.; Smith, James M. (Spring 1975). "Captain Henry Wirz, C.S.A., 1865". Military Law Review: 77–132.
- Logan, Mary S.C. (1901). Thirty Years in Washington; or, Life and Scenes in Our National Capital. Hartford, Conn.: A.D. Worthington & Co. p. 299. "Henry Wirz Mount Olivet March 1869."
- Lynn, John W. (1998). 800 Paces to Hell: The Story of Andersonville Prison. Fredericksburg, Va.: Sergeant Kirkland's Museum and Historical Society. ISBN 9781887901192.
- Ruhlman, R. Fred (2006). Captain Henry Wirz and Andersonville Prison: A Reappraisal. Knoxville: University of Tennessee Press. ISBN 9781572335417.
- Schroeder-Lein, Glenna R.; Zuczek, Richard, eds. (2001). "Wirz, Henry". Andrew Johnson: A Biographical Companion. Santa Barbara, Calif.: ABC-CLIO. ISBN 1576070301.
- Smith, Charles Anthony (2012). The Rise and Fall of War Crimes Trials: From Charles I to Bush II. Cambridge, U.K.: Cambridge University Press. ISBN 9781107380028.
- Society for the History of the Germans in Maryland (1959). Thirtieth Report. Baltimore, Md.: Society for the History of the Germans in Maryland.
