= Andersonville (film) =

Movie about andersonville prison

- Poster
- Genre: Drama; History; War
- Written by: David W. Rintels
- Directed by: John Frankenheimer
- Starring: Jarrod Emick; Frederic Forrest; Ted Marcoux
- Music by: Gary Chang
- Country of origin: United States
- Original language: English

Production
- Executive producers: John Frankenheimer; Ethel Winant
- Producers: Diane Batson-Smith (as Diane Smith); David W. Rintels; Lansing L. Smith
- Production locations: Turin, Georgia; Wilmington, North Carolina
- Cinematography: Ric Waite
- Editor: Paul Rubell
- Running time: 167 minutes
- Production company: Turner Pictures

Original release
- Network: TNT
- Release: March 3, 1996

Andersonville is a 1996 American television film directed by John Frankenheimer about a group of Union soldiers during the American Civil War who are captured by the Confederates and sent to an infamous Confederate prison camp. The film premiered on TNT on March 3, 1996.

The film is loosely based on the diary of John Ransom, a Union soldier imprisoned there. Although certain points of the plot are fabricated, the general conditions of the camp accurately match Ransom's descriptions, particularly references to the administration of the camp by Captain Henry Wirz. His line on escaping prisoners is very similar to the book, "The Flying Dutchman (Wirz) offers to give two at a time twelve hours the start".

== Plot ==
In June 1864, a group of soldiers from Company I, 19th Massachusetts Infantry Regiment are captured at the Battle of Cold Harbor in Virginia. They are transported by train to Georgia and marched to the military prison, Camp Sumter. Confederate Captain Henry Wirz, the commandant, explains to the new prisoners of war that escape is impossible due to his use of scent hounds and that a prisoner exchange is expected to occur soon.

The group encounters Dick Potter, a former comrade who was captured at the Battle of Antietam. He prevents them from being lured into the territory of the "Raiders", a collective of rogue prisoners who attack, rob, and sometimes kill new internees in order to hoard their supplies. Potter further explains the grim realities of the camp; there is minimal shelter, safe drinking water, and food. Due to the Confederacy's dwindling population of able-bodied men, teenagers and old men are used as guards. Some of them delight in coaxing the prisoners to step over the "dead line" fence under the guise of trading for food, resulting in the prisoners being shot dead. A Confederate Colonel audits the camp, chastising Wirz for the abysmal conditions. Wirz responds with nothing but excuses, even asking for a promotion recommendation.

A group of men from the 19th Massachusetts ally themselves with other prisoners who are working on a secret tunnel under the stockade wall. As the group comes closer to completing the tunnel, the Raiders attack and tensions rise after they kill Potter. One prisoner attempts to inform the guards of the tunnel in hopes of receiving a reward; he is captured and "TT" (tunnel traitor) is carved into his forehead. The tunnel is completed and the escape commences; all except a few are killed or captured and placed in standing stocks as punishment.

The situation with the Raiders eventually becomes unbearable. A prisoner rallies support from the disparate groups and a prison riot ensues, resulting in the defeat and capture of the Raiders. With disagreements over what to do with the Raiders, a request for a legitimate court-martial is made to Captain Wirz who approves only if the trial is handled internally by the prisoners themselves. A jury of new internees find the six Raider chieftains guilty and they are sentenced to death by hanging, while the lower ranking members of the Raiders are sentenced to run a gauntlet.

Life in the camp becomes relatively peaceful. A group of new internees arrive and inform that one of the escapees successfully made it to General Grant and informed him of the camp's horrid conditions, but that Grant ordered no further prisoner exchanges due to the Confederacy's poor treatment of black Union soldiers. A Confederate officer arrives and offers the prisoners a deal: fight for the Confederacy to earn their freedom. The men of the 19th Massachusetts fall into formation and turn their backs on the officer; the companies of other prisoners follow suit. As time progresses and conditions worsen, starvation and disease begin to take their toll and thousands perish. Later, Captain Wirz announces that all prisoners are to be exchanged. The surviving prisoners leave the camp, filing past their dead comrades on the way to the trains.

Against a view of the present-day Andersonville National Cemetery, the movie's end coda reads:

In 1864–5, more than 45,000 Union soldiers were imprisoned in Andersonville. 12,912 died there. The prisoner exchange never happened. The men who walked to the trains were taken to other prisons, where they remained until the war ended. After the war, Wirz was hanged, the only soldier to be tried and executed for war crimes committed during the Civil War.

== Cast ==
- Jarrod Emick as Josiah Day
- Frederic Forrest as Sgt. McSpadden
- Ted Marcoux as Martin Blackburn
- Carmen Argenziano as Hopkins
- Jayce Bartok as Billy
- Frederick Coffin as Collins
- Cliff DeYoung as Sgt. John Gleason
- Denis Forest as Mad Matthew
- Justin Henry as Tyce
- Tony Higgins as Tucker
- Andrew Kavovit as Tobias
- Olek Krupa as Olek Wisnovsky
- William H. Macy as Col. Chandler
- Matt McGrath as Ethan
- Peter Murnik as Limber Jim
- Gabriel Olds as Bob Reese
- William Sanderson as Munn
- Gregory Sporleder as Dick Potter
- Jan Tříska as Capt. Henry Wirz
- Bruce Evers as Lt. Barrett
- Robert David Hall as Samson
- Thomas F. Wilson as Thomas

== Production ==
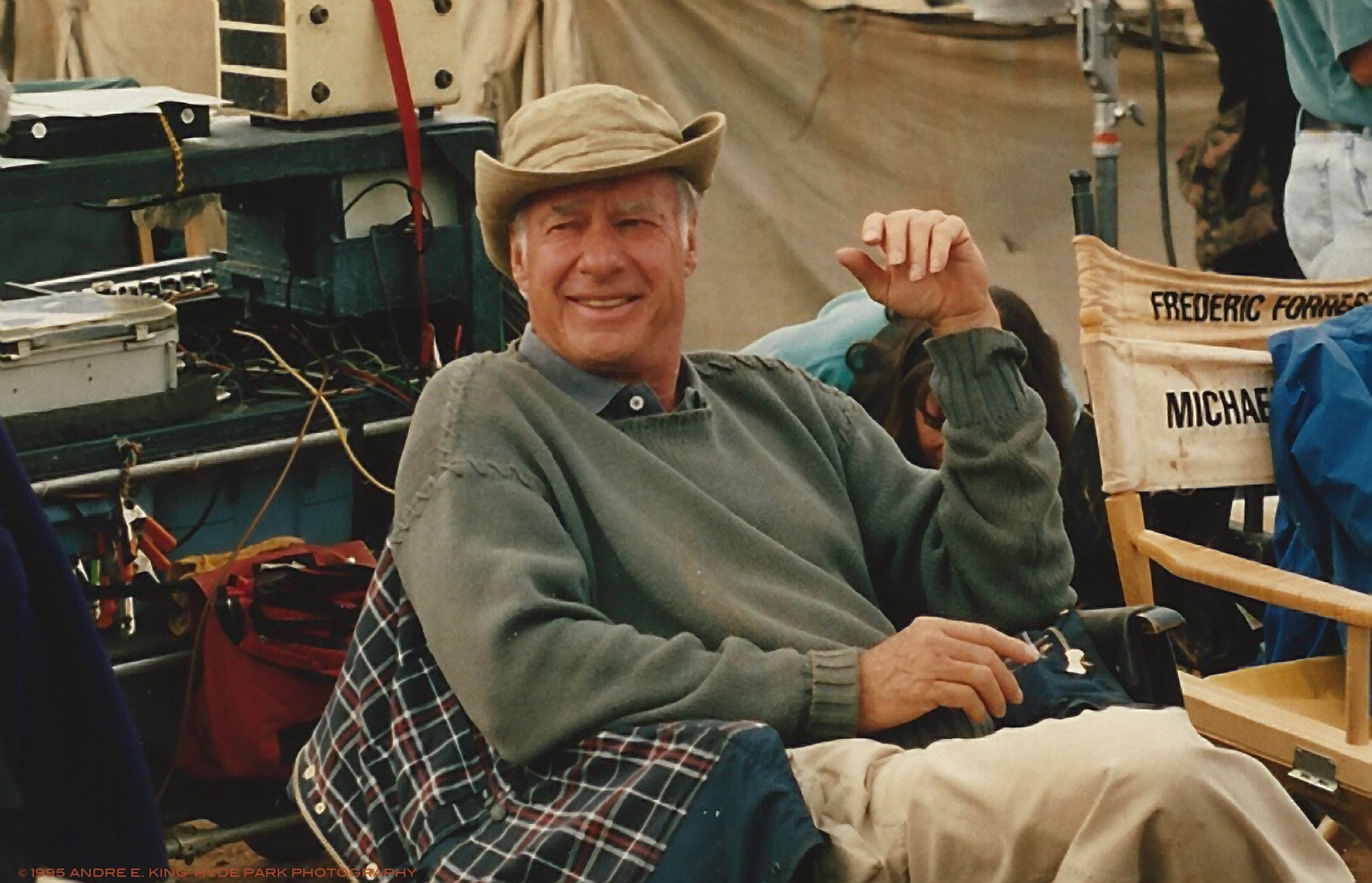
John Frankenheimer, director of Andersonville, on set in 1994.

The mini series was a pet project of mogul Ted Turner, an American Civil War enthusiast who wanted to bring to the screen a series of historically accurate films about the conflict. After the critical acclaim and financial success of his previous production Gettysburg in 1993, he would go on to produce its prequel Gods and Generals in 2003. All were massive productions on huge scales.

Andersonville was filmed on location on a farm some fifty miles south of Atlanta (about a hundred miles north of the actual location of the camp) where a huge set was built (not quite to scale) of the actual camp. Accurate in detail down to the officer's quarters outside the camp gates, the fifteen foot high raw timber walls and thousands of ragged tents, a working stream, and even a full scale railway depot with half of a locomotive made of wood were built on the property. At any given time there were hundreds of extras employed every day, many of whom were Civil War reenactors who came from all over the nation to take part in the production. Their deep devotion to the subject matter and attention to detail gave the film much of its authenticity. Many of the extras were also college students, both men and women brought in by the busload for the larger scenes. At its height more than four thousand extras a day were employed, making it necessary to have an ultra early call time of three a.m. for a general set call of seven. Dozens of additional makeup, hair, wardrobe and production staff were needed for these scenes, which actually went very well due to military style organization with the "troops" even being marched in platoons from the preparation tents to the set.

Shot in the early to late fall of 1994, it was a typical southern season of change with the weather proving difficult at best. With temperatures swinging between extremely hot to cold and rainy, the heavy red clay that makes up Georgia soil would turn into a sludge up to three feet deep during rains and would solidify to rock hard status a day later when temperatures soared. Long days took their toll on the cast and crew and the situation came to a head when disaster struck at the end of principal photography.

The critical scenes involving the trials and hanging of the raiders were shot over two days with the raw film being shipped out to Los Angeles labs every few days. The crate containing this film was lost in transit by the shipping company and though there was tremendous effort to find it the film was never located. Shooting had just wrapped with sets being torn down and the farm location restored. This necessitated a partial re-building of the set on location in North Carolina and a gathering of all the principal actors involved in the scenes for a very costly re-shoot which took about a week to complete.

== Release ==
=== Critical reception ===
Caryn James of The New York Times gave a critical review of the film. She described the movie's central characters, especially the Raiders, as clichéd and underdeveloped. James faulted many elements of the plot as being similar to events in other prison movies. She said that the film improved as it went on, but not enough to redeem it, adding: "Scene for scene, Mr. Frankenheimer knows how to build tension, even when it fails to lead anywhere surprising."

Howard Rosenberg of The Los Angeles Times praised the film for its opening sequences, visual effects, and historical accuracy. However, he took issue with its pacing in addition to what he believed to be a lack of suspense, and like James noted similarities to previous films. Rosenberg said that, while the central cast performed "ably," none of the characters stood out well enough from each other to allow the audience to root "for an individual instead of for a tormented blur."

=== Awards and nominations ===
Year	Award	Category	Nominee(s)	Result	Ref.
1996	Artios Awards	Outstanding Achievement in Mini-Series Casting	Marsha Kleinman	Won	
1996	Humanitas Prize	PBS/Cable Television	David W. Rintels (for "Part 2")	Nominated	
1996	Primetime Emmy Awards	Outstanding Miniseries	Ethel Winant, John Frankenheimer, David W. Rintels, and Diane Batson-Smith	Nominated	
1996	Primetime Emmy Awards	Outstanding Directing for a Miniseries or a Special	John Frankenheimer	Won	
1996	Primetime Emmy Awards	Outstanding Art Direction for a Miniseries or a Special	Michael Z. Hanan, Edward L. Rubin, and Douglas A. Mowat	Nominated	
1996	Primetime Emmy Awards	Outstanding Cinematography for a Miniseries or a Special	Ric Waite	Nominated	
1996	Primetime Emmy Awards	Outstanding Costume Design for a Miniseries or a Special	May Routh	Nominated	
1996	Primetime Emmy Awards	Outstanding Editing for a Miniseries or a Special – Single Camera Production	Paul Rubell	Nominated	
1996	Primetime Emmy Awards	Outstanding Sound Mixing for a Drama Miniseries or a Special	Mary H. Ellis, Richard D. Rogers, John J. Stephens, and Grover B. Helsley	Nominated	
1997	American Cinema Editors Awards	Best Edited Episode from a Television Mini-Series	Paul Rubell (for "Part 2")	Won	
1997	Directors Guild of America Awards	Outstanding Directorial Achievement in Dramatic Specials	John Frankenheimer	Nominated	
1997	Golden Reel Awards	Television Mini-Series: Sound Editing	Brady Schwartz	Nominated	
1997	Writers Guild of America Awards	Original Long Form	David W. Rintels (for "Part 2")	Nominated	
