= John McElroy (author) =

American soldier, printer and writer

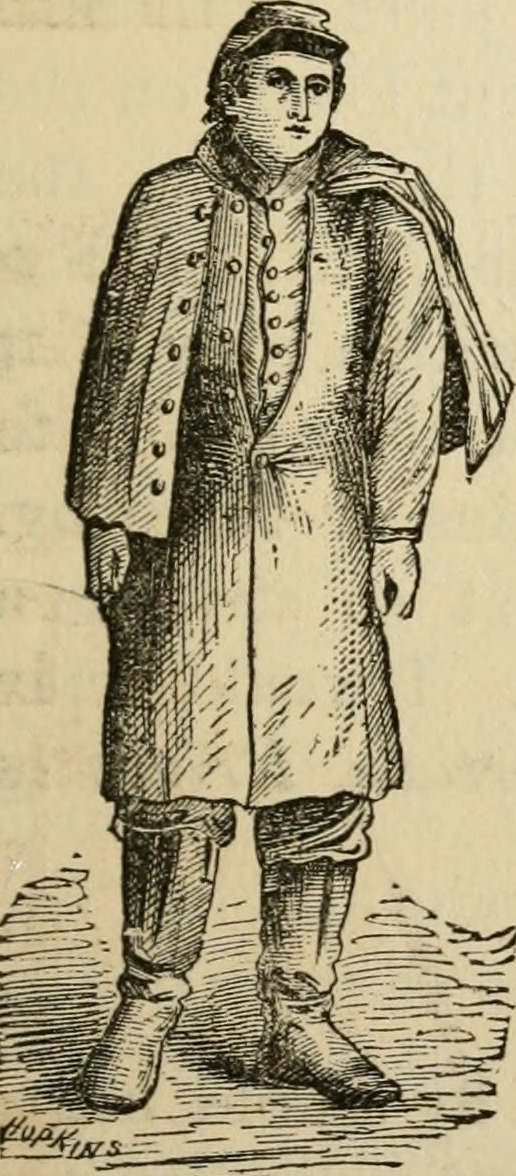
John McElroy's appearance on entering Andersonville Prison.

John McElroy (1846–1929) was an American printer, soldier, journalist and author, known mainly for writing the novel The Red Acorn and the four-volume Andersonville: A Story of Rebel Military Prisons, based upon his lengthy confinement in the Confederate Andersonville prison camp during the American Civil War.

== Biography ==
McElroy was born to Robert and Mary Henderson McElroy in Greenup County, Kentucky. When his father died, he traveled to St. Louis to become an apprentice in the printing business.

As a sixteen-year-old in 1863, McElroy enlisted with the Union Army as a private in Company L of the 16th Illinois Cavalry regiment, having earlier served with local Union troops in operations near St. Louis. In January 1864, he was among dozens of men captured in a skirmish near Jonesville, Virginia, by Confederate cavalrymen commanded by William E. Jones. According to his book, Andersonville: A Story of Rebel Military Prisons, McElroy was first sent to Richmond, then to Andersonville in February 1864. In October 1864 he was moved to Savannah and within about six weeks was sent to the new prison in Millen, Georgia (Camp Lawton); thence to several other camps before the war ended.

After the war ended, McElroy was released from captivity and transported back to the North. He settled in Chicago and resumed the printer's trade. He became a local reporter and newspaperman before relocating to Toledo, Ohio, to become an editor of the Toledo Blade. He married Elsie Pomeroy of Ottawa, Ohio, and raised a family. In 1879, he wrote Andersonville: A Story of Rebel Military Prisons, a non-fiction work based on his experiences during his fifteen-month incarceration. It quickly became a bestseller and remained popular for the next twenty years.

In 1884, he relocated from Toledo to Washington, D.C. to become editor and co-owner of the newspaper National Tribune, where Elsie Pomeroy McElroy wrote "The Better Half" column. He was active in the local Grand Army of the Republic, serving as commander of the Department of the Potomac during 1896. In 1908, McElroy published The Economic Functions of Vice. The next year, he published The Struggle for Missouri, a history of the controversy concerning slavery that resulted in armed conflict in Missouri. In 1910, he published a Civil War novel entitled Si Klegg: His Transformation from a Raw Recruit to a Veteran.
