= MacKinlay Kantor =

American journalist (1904–1977)

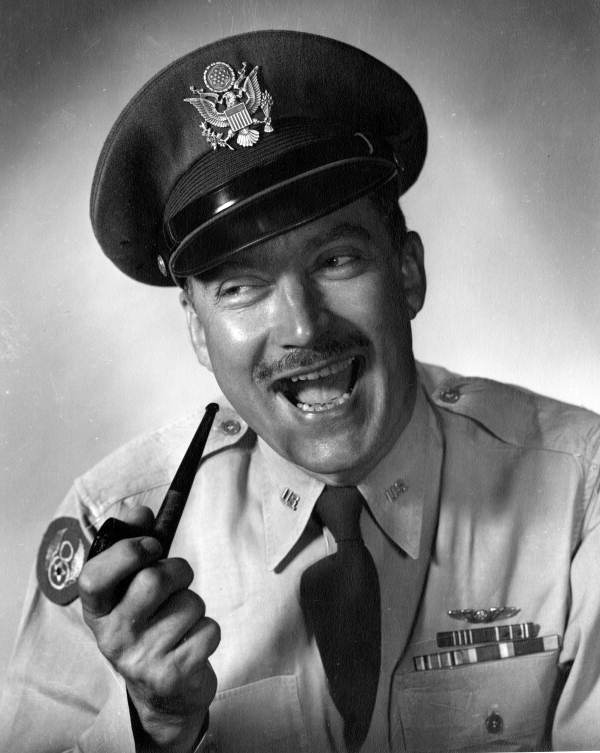
- Kantor in 1950
- Born: Benjamin McKinlay Kantor; February 4, 1904; Webster City, Iowa, U.S.
- Died: October 11, 1977 (aged 73); Sarasota, Florida, U.S.
- Spouse: Florence Layne
- Children: 2
- Writing career
- Notable work: Andersonville (Pulitzer Prize)

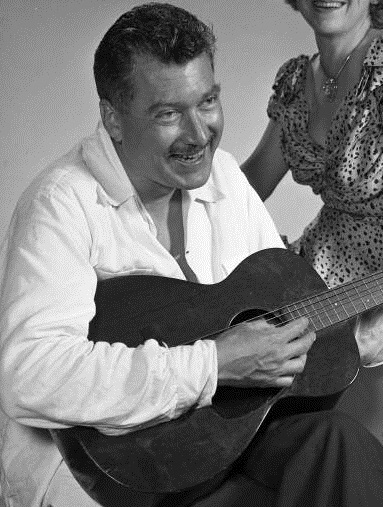
Kantor in Sarasota (1950)

MacKinlay Kantor (February 4, 1904 – October 11, 1977), born Benjamin McKinlay Kantor, was an American journalist, novelist and screenwriter. He wrote more than 30 novels, several set during the American Civil War, and was awarded the Pulitzer Prize for Fiction in 1956 for his 1955 novel, Andersonville.

== Early life and education ==
Kantor was born and grew up in Webster City, Iowa, with his older sister, Virginia. His mother, Effie (McKinlay) Kantor, worked as the editor of the Webster City Daily News during part of his childhood. His father, John Martin Kantor, was a native-born Swedish Jew descended from "a long line of rabbis, who posed as a Protestant clergyman". His mother was of English, Irish, Scottish, and Pennsylvania Dutch ancestry. (Later, MacKinlay Kantor wrote an unpublished novel called Half Jew.)

Kantor's father had trouble keeping jobs and abandoned the family before Kantor was born. His mother returned to her parents in Webster City, Mr. and Mrs. Adam McKinlay, to live at their home with her children.

As a child, the boy started using his middle name McKinlay as his given name. He changed its spelling, adding an "a", because he thought it sounded more Scottish, and chose to be called "Mack" or MacKinlay. He attended the local schools and described the Kendall Young Public Library as his "university". Kantor won a writing contest with his first story, "Purple".

== Career ==
=== Stories, journalism, and novels ===
From 1928 to 1934, Kantor wrote numerous stories for pulp fiction magazines, to earn a living and support his family; these works included crime stories and mysteries. He sold his first pulp stories, "Delivery Not Received" and "A Bad Night for Benny", to Edwin Baird, editor of Real Detective Tales and Mystery Stories. He also wrote for Detective Fiction Weekly. In 1928, Kantor published his first novel, Diversey, set in Chicago, Illinois.

In 1932, Kantor moved with his family from the Midwest to New Jersey, in the New York metropolitan area. He was an early resident of Free Acres, a social experimental community developed by activist Bolton Hall in Berkeley Heights, New Jersey. In two years, he sold 16 short stories and a serialized novel to Howard Bloomfield, editor of Detective Fiction Weekly. He also acquired a professional agent, Sydney Sanders.

Achieving some success by 1934, Kantor began to submit short stories to the "slick magazines" (glossies). His "Rogue's Gallery", published in Collier on August 24, 1935, became his most frequently reprinted story.

It was during this decade that Kantor first wrote about the American Civil War, beginning with his novel Long Remember (1934), set at the Battle of Gettysburg. As a boy and teenager in Iowa, Kantor had spent hours listening to the stories of Civil War veterans, and he was an avid collector of first-hand narratives. His work was also part of the literature event in the art competition at the 1936 Summer Olympics.

During World War II, Kantor reported from London as a war correspondent for a Los Angeles newspaper. After flying with some bombing missions, he asked for and received training to operate the bomber's turret machine guns, although he was not in service and this violated regulations. Kantor interviewed numerous wounded troops, whose thoughts and ideas inspired a later novel of his.

When Kantor interviewed U.S. troops, many told him the only goal was to get home alive. He was reminded of the Protestant hymn: "When all my labors and trials are o'er / And I am safe on that beautiful shore [Heaven], O that will be / Glory for me!" Kantor returned from the European theater of war on military air transport (MAT). After the war, the producer Samuel Goldwyn commissioned him to write a screenplay about veterans returning home. Kantor wrote a novel in blank verse, which was published as Glory for Me (1945). After selling the movie rights to his novel, Kantor was disappointed that the film was released under the title The Best Years of Our Lives (1946), and that details of the story had been changed by the screenwriter Robert Sherwood. Kantor was said to have lost his temper with Goldwyn and walked off the Hollywood lot. The first 15 seconds of the movie note that it is "based upon a novel by MacKinlay Kantor", but the novel's title is not given. The film was a commercial and critical success, winning seven Academy Awards.

Beginning in 1948, Kantor arranged an intensive period of research with the New York City Police Department (NYCPD). He was the only civilian other than reporters allowed to ride with police on their beat. He often rode on night shifts, working with the 23rd Precinct, whose territory ranged from upper Park Avenue to East Harlem, comprising a wide range of residents and incomes. These experiences informed most of his short crime novels, as well as his major work Signal Thirty-Two, published in 1950 with jacket art by his wife Irene Layne Kantor.

Also in 1950 Kantor took up research into the post-war life of a war widow. In discussions with the chaplain at Mitchel Field, Kantor was referred to Margaret Stavish of Bellmore, New York, who had lost her B-24 pilot husband, Edward Dobson, killed in action on November 18, 1943, and in 1947 married John Stavish, a veteran of the Pacific theater. Kantor then published their story, "V-J Day Plus Five Years," in the August 1950 issue of Redbook Magazine.

Kantor was noted for his limited use of punctuation within his literary compositions. He was known for a lack of quotation marks and was influential in this regard on Cormac McCarthy, who said that Kantor was the first writer he encountered who left them out. Kantor was one of three primary influences on McCarthy's adopting his unique style.

During his assignment with the U.S. troops in World War II, Kantor entered the Buchenwald concentration camp as they liberated it on April 14, 1945. During the next decade, that experience informed his research for and writing of Andersonville (1955), his novel about the Confederate prisoner of war camp. One of the problems he struggled with in Germany and afterward was how to think of the civilians who lived near Buchenwald. As he struggled to understand, he developed ideas which he expressed in his novel, where he portrayed some civilian Southerners sympathetically, in contrast to officers at the camp. He won the Pulitzer Prize in 1956 for Andersonville.

In writing more than 30 novels, Kantor often returned to the theme of the American Civil War. He wrote two works for young readers set in the Civil War years: Lee and Grant at Appomattox (1950) and Gettysburg (1952).

In the November 22, 1960, issue of Look magazine, Kantor published a fictional account set as a history text, titled If the South Had Won the Civil War. This generated such a response that it was published in 1961 as a short book. It is one of many alternate histories of that war.

Kantor's last novel was Valley Forge (1975).

=== Films ===
In addition to journalism and novels, several of his novels were adapted for films by other writers.

Kantor was credited as writing the screenplay for Gun Crazy (also known as Deadly Is the Female) (1950), a film noir. It was based on his short story by the same name, published February 3, 1940, in The Saturday Evening Post. However, in 1992, it was revealed that Dalton Trumbo had written the Gun Crazy screenplay, as Trumbo, one of the Hollywood Ten, had been blacklisted as a result of his refusal to testify before the House Un-American Activities Committee (HUAC) hearings. Kantor passed his payment on to Trumbo to help him survive.

Kantor acted in the film Wind Across the Everglades (1958).

The film Follow Me, Boys! (1966) was based on his novel God and My Country.

=== Publishing ===
Kantor established his own publishing house, and published several of his works in the 1930s and 1940s.

== Marriage and family ==
Kantor married Florence Irene Layne, and they had two children together. Their son Tim Kantor wrote a memoir of his father, titled My Father's Voice: MacKinlay Kantor Long Remembered (1988). His grandson, Tom Shroder wrote a biography of his grandfather titled, The Most Famous Writer Who Ever Lived: A True Story of My Family. (Blue Rider Press, 2016)

== Death ==
Kantor died of a heart attack in 1977, aged 73, at his home in Sarasota, Florida.

== Works ==
=== Novels ===
- Diversey (1928)
- El Goes South (1930)
- The Grave Grass Quivers (1931)
- The Jaybird (1932)
- Long Remember (1934)
- The Voice of Bugle Ann (1935)
- Arouse and Beware (1936)
- The Romance of Rosy Ridge (1937)
- The Noise of Their Wings (1938)
- Here Lies Holly Springs (1938)
- Valedictory (1939, Illustrated by Amos Sewell)
- Cuba Libre (1940)
- Gentle Annie (1942)
- Happy Land (1943)
- Glory for Me (1945)
- Midnight Lace (1948)
- The Good Family (1949)
- Wicked Water (1949)
- One Wild Oat (1950)
- Signal Thirty-Two (1950)
- Don't Touch Me (1951)
- Warwhoop: Two Short Novels of the Frontier (1952)
- The Daughter of Bugle Ann (1953)
- God and My Country (1954)
- Andersonville (1955)
- Frontier: Tales of the American Adventure (1959)
- The Unseen Witness (1959)
- Spirit Lake (1961)
- If the South Had Won the Civil War (1961, illustrated by Isa Barnett) (Originally published in Look magazine, November 22, 1960)
- Beauty Beast (1968)
- I Love You, Irene (1973)
- The Children Sing (1974)
- Valley Forge (1975)

=== Collections ===
- Turkey in the Straw: A Book of American Ballads and Primitive Verse (1935)
- Author's Choice (1944, stories)
- Silent Grow the Guns, and Other Tales of the American Civil War (1958, stories))
- It's About Crime (1960, stories)
- The Gun-Toter, and Other Stories of the Missouri Hills (1963, stories)
- Story Teller (1967, stories and essays)

=== Children's and young adult books ===
- Angleworms on Toast (1942, illustrated by Kurt Wiese)
- Lee and Grant at Appomattox (1950, illustrated by Donald McKay)
- Gettysburg (1952, illustrated by Donald McKay)
- The Work of Saint Francis (1958, illustrated by Johannes Troyer)

=== Nonfiction ===
- But Look, the Morn: The Story of a Childhood (memoir, 1939, 1941; after establishing his own publishing company, it published the book in 1947, 1951)
- Lobo (1958)
- Mission with LeMay: My Story, by Curtis LeMay with MacKinlay Kantor (1965)
- The Day I Met a Lion (1968, memoir/essays)
- Missouri Bittersweet (1969)
- Hamilton County (1970)

=== Highly anthologized stories ===
- A Man Who Had No Eyes

== Filmography ==
Films

- The Voice of Bugle Ann (novel) (1936)
- Mountain Music (story) (1937)
- The Man from Dakota (novel, Arouse and Beware) (1940)
- Happy Land (novel) (1943)
- Gentle Annie (novel) (1944)
- The Best Years of Our Lives (novel, Glory for Me) (1946)
- The Romance of Rosy Ridge (novel) (1947)
- Gun Crazy (story and screenplay) (1950)
- Hannah Lee: An American Primitive (novel, Wicked Water) (1953)
- Wind Across the Everglades (actor) (1958)
- Follow Me, Boys! (novel, God and My Country) (1966)

Television

- Lux Video Theatre, episode "Forever Walking Free" (story) (1951)
- Studio One in Hollywood, episode "Signal Thirty-Two" (novel) (1953)
- The 20th Century Fox Hour, episode "In Times Like These" (novel, Happy Land) (1956)

== Legacy and honors ==
- 1956 Pulitzer Prize for Andersonville (1955)
- 1976, Kantor-Mollenhoff Plaza in West Twin Park, Webster City, Iowa, was named in honor of him and the author Clark R. Mollenhoff, as part of the city's Bicentennial Celebration
- 1989, MacKinlay Kantor Drive in Webster City was named in his honor.
- Original editions of his more than 40 books were donated to the Kendall Young Library in Webster City by his longtime friend Richard Whiteman, who also donated more than $1 million for an expansion of the library.
