= Andersonville Prison =

Confederate prisoner-of-war camp in Georgia

- Andersonville National Historic Site
- U.S. National Register of Historic Places
- U.S. Historic district
- U.S. National Historic Site
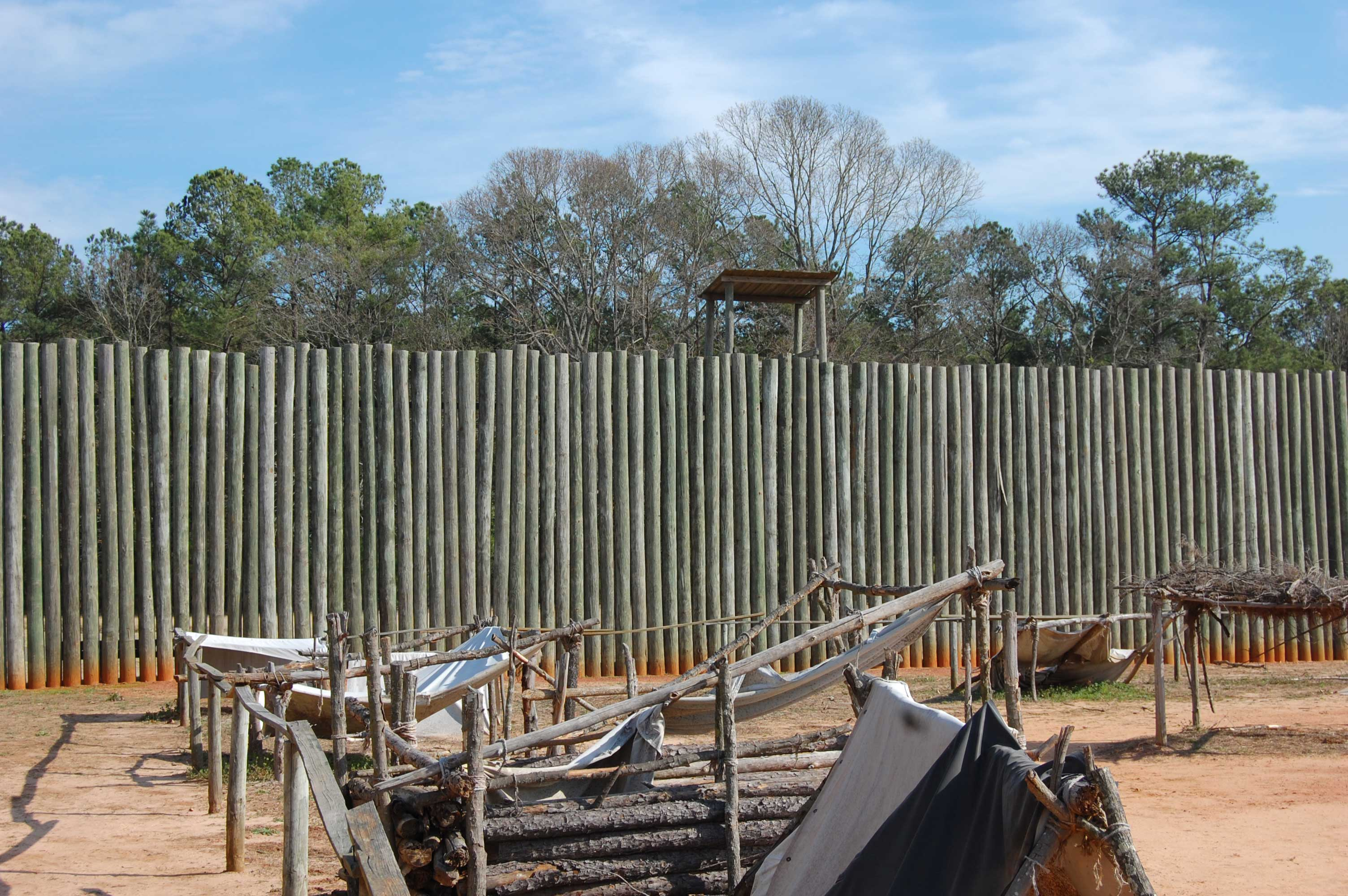
- Reconstruction of a section of the stockade wall

- Location within Georgia Location within the United States
- Location: Macon / Sumter counties, Georgia, United States
- Nearest city: Andersonville, Georgia, Americus, Georgia
- Coordinates: 32°11′41″N 84°07′44″W
- Area: 514 acres (208 ha)
- Visitation: 61,850 (2025)
- Website: Andersonville National Historic Site
- NRHP reference No.: 70000070

Significant dates
- Added to NRHP: October 16, 1970
- Designated NHS: October 16, 1970

Andersonville Prison (also known as Camp Sumter), located near Andersonville, Georgia, was a Confederate prisoner-of-war camp during the final fourteen months of the American Civil War. Most of the site lies in southwestern Macon County, adjacent to the east side of the town of Andersonville. The prison was created in February 1864 and served until April 1865. Today, the area is preserved as the Andersonville National Historic Site. The site also contains the Andersonville National Cemetery and the National Prisoner of War Museum.

The site was commanded by Captain Henry Wirz, who was tried and executed after the war for war crimes. The prison was overcrowded to four times its capacity, and had an inadequate water supply, inadequate food, and unsanitary conditions. Of the approximately 45,000 Union prisoners held at Camp Sumter during the war, nearly 13,000 (28%) died. The chief causes of death were scurvy, diarrhea, and dysentery.

== Conditions ==
The prison, which opened in February 1864, originally covered about 16.5 acres (6.7 ha) of land enclosed by a 15-foot-high (4.6 m) stockade. In June 1864, it was enlarged to 26.5 acres (10.7 ha). The stockade was rectangular, of dimensions 1,620 feet (490 m) by 779 feet (237 m). There were two entrances on the west side of the stockade, known as "north entrance" and "south entrance". This allowed for a space of about 5 feet by 6 feet (1.5 x 2 m) for each prisoner.

=== Descriptions of Andersonville ===
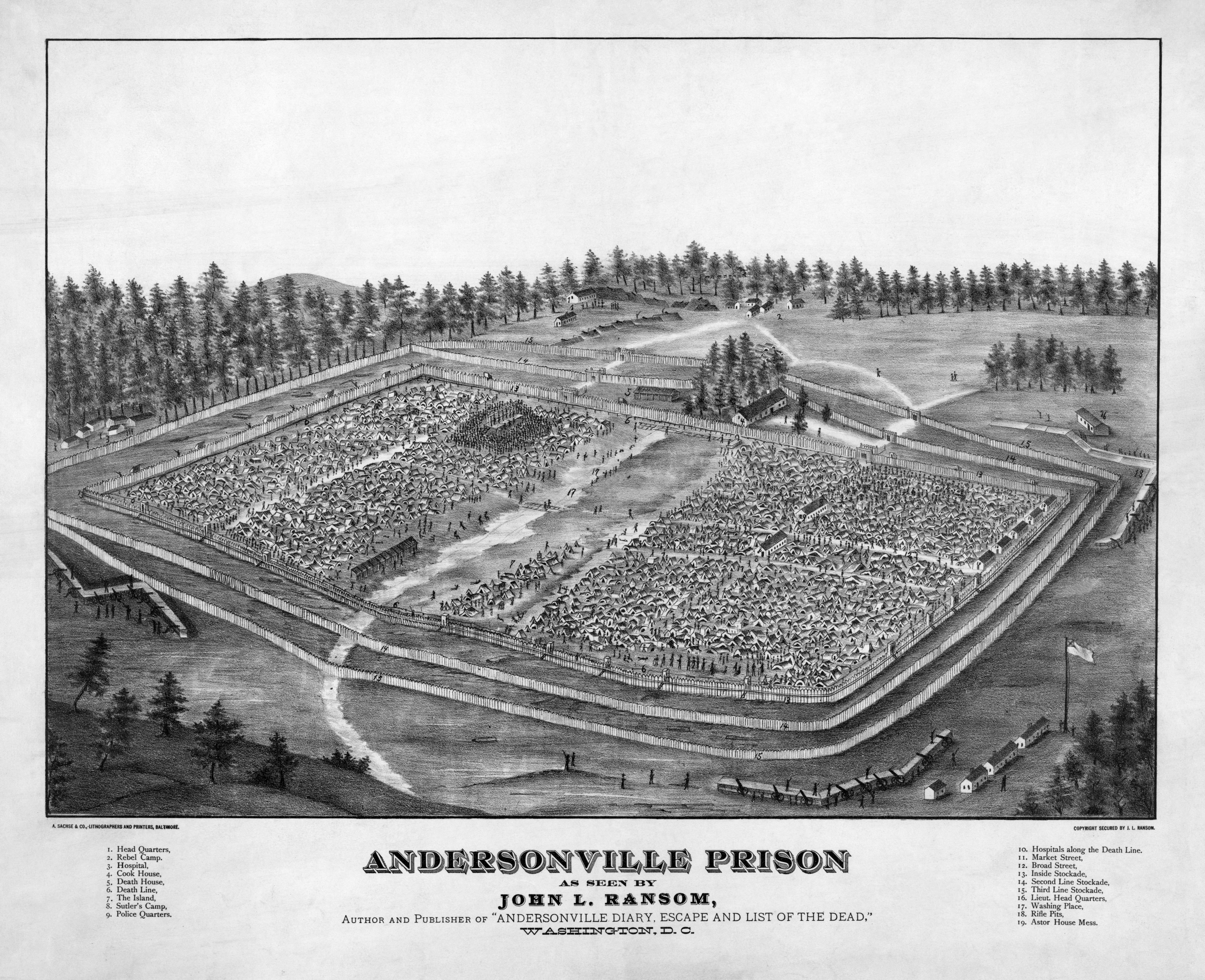
A depiction of Andersonville Prison by John L. Ransom, former prisoner

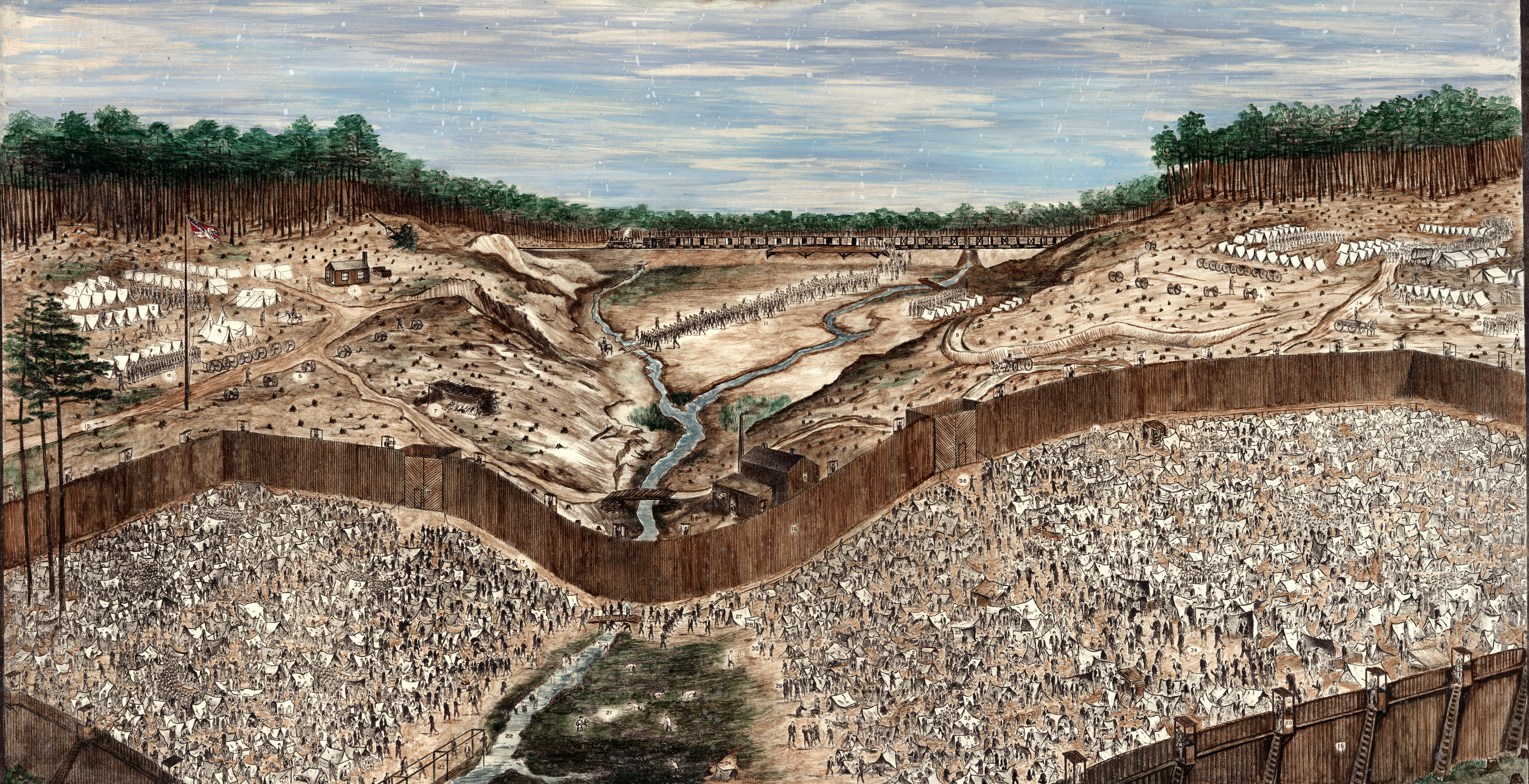
A drawing of Andersonville Prison by Thomas O'Dea, former prisoner

Robert H. Kellogg, sergeant major in the 16th Regiment Connecticut Volunteers, described his entry as a prisoner into the prison camp, May 2, 1864:

As we entered the place, a spectacle met our eyes that almost froze our blood with horror, and made our hearts fail within us. Before us were forms that had once been active and erect;—stalwart men, now nothing but mere walking skeletons, covered with filth and vermin. Many of our men, in the heat and intensity of their feeling, exclaimed with earnestness. "Can this be hell?" "God protect us!" and all thought that he alone could bring them out alive from so terrible a place. In the center of the whole was a swamp, occupying about three or four acres of the narrowed limits, and a part of this marshy place had been used by the prisoners as a sink, and excrement covered the ground, the scent arising from which was suffocating. The ground allotted to our ninety was near the edge of this plague-spot, and how we were to live through the warm summer weather in the midst of such fearful surroundings, was more than we cared to think of just then.

Further descriptions of the camp can be found in the diary of Ransom Chadwick, a member of the 85th New York Infantry Regiment. Chadwick and his regimental mates were taken to the Andersonville Prison, arriving on April 30, 1864. An extensive and detailed diary was kept by John L. Ransom of the 9th Michigan Cavalry Regiment of his time as a prisoner at Andersonville.

Father Peter Whelan arrived on June 16, 1864, to muster the resources of the Catholic church and help provide relief to the prisoners.

=== The dead line ===
At Andersonville, a light fence known as "the dead line" was erected approximately 19 ft (5.8 m) inside the stockade wall. It demarcated a no-man's land that kept prisoners away from the wall, which was made of rough-hewn logs about 16 ft (4.9 m) high and stakes driven into the ground. Anyone crossing or even touching this "dead line" was shot without warning by sentries in the guard platforms (called "pigeon roosts") on the stockade. (It is considered possible, although not established, that the modern term deadline in the sense of a time limit derives from this.)

=== Health problems ===
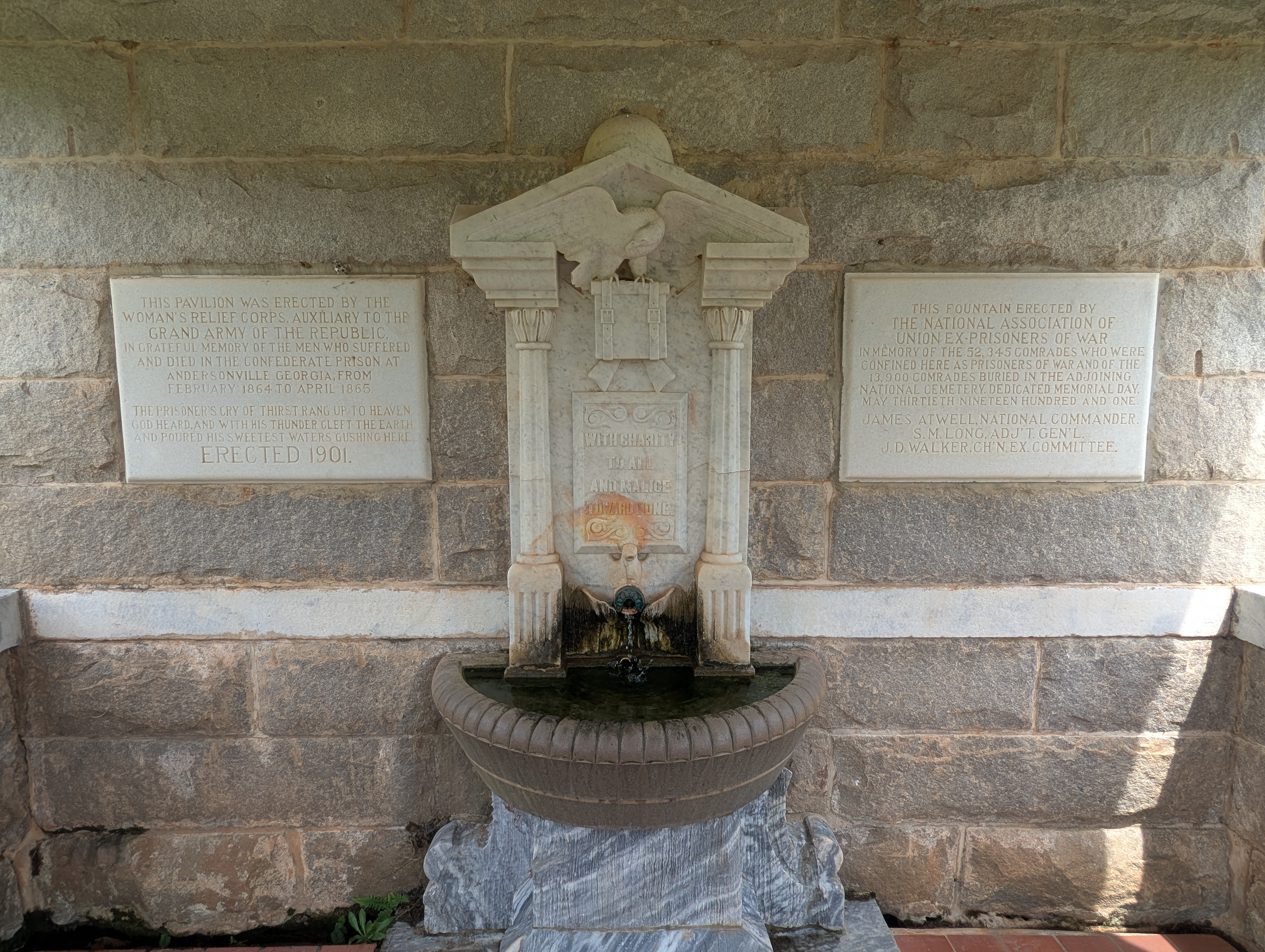
Providence Spring, the only source of clean drinking water for the prisoners (fountain erected in 1901)

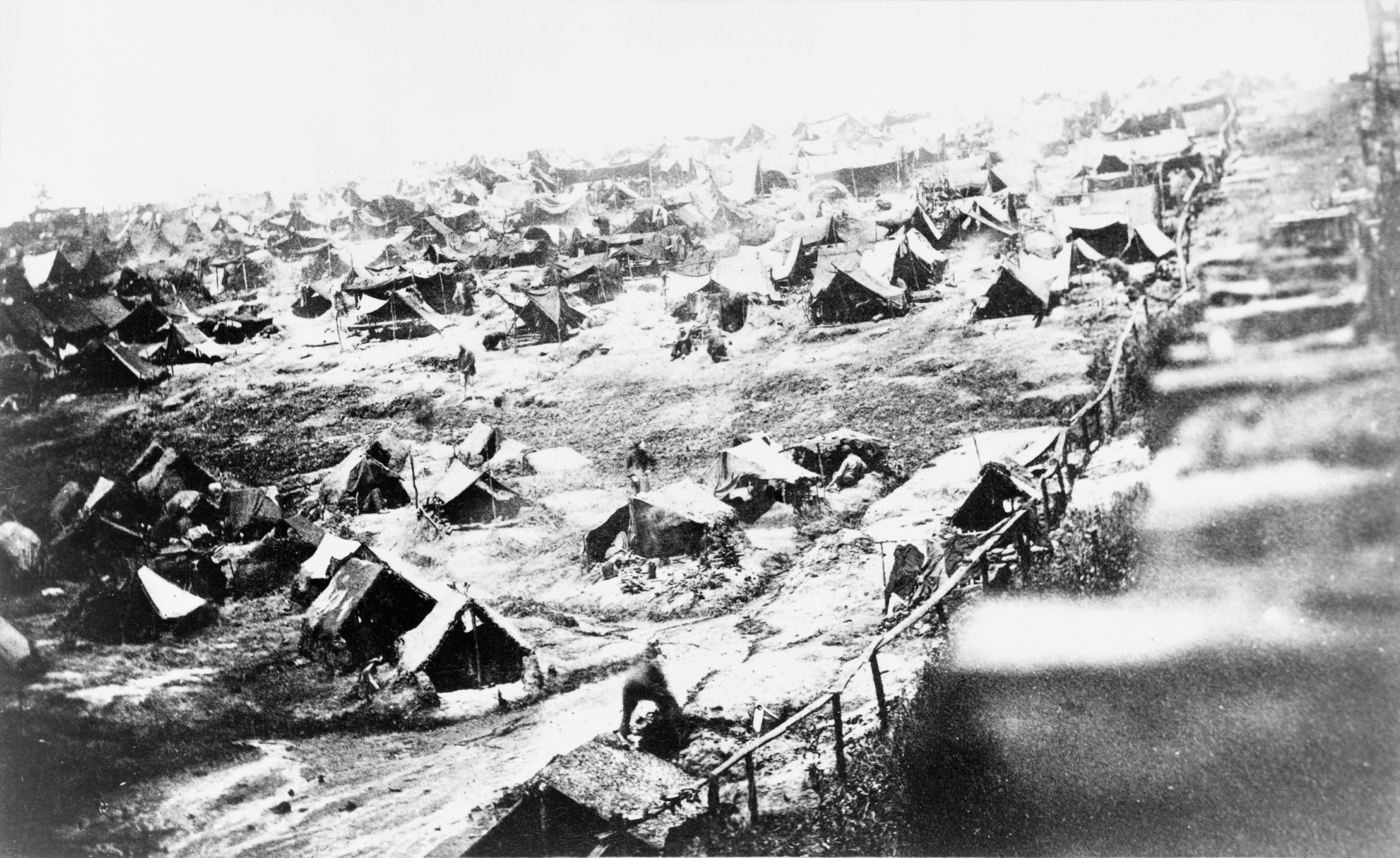
Andersonville prisoners and tents, southwest view showing the dead-line, August 17, 1864

At this stage of the war, Andersonville Prison was frequently under-supplied with food. By 1864, civilians in the Confederacy and soldiers of the Confederate Army were all struggling to obtain sufficient quantities of food. The shortage of fare was suffered by prisoners and Confederate personnel alike within the fort, but the prisoners received less than the guards. Unlike the captives, the guards did not become severely emaciated or suffer from scurvy as a consequence of vitamin C deficiency due to a lack of fresh fruits and vegetables in their diet. The poor diets and resulting scurvy was likely a major cause of the camp's high mortality rate, as well as dysentery and typhoid fever. These resulted from filthy living conditions and poor sanitation. The only source of drinking water was a creek that also served as the camp's latrine. It was filled at all times with fecal matter from thousands of sick and dying men. Even when sufficient quantities of supplies were available, they were of poor quality and inadequately prepared.

There were no new outfits given to prisoners, whose own clothing was often falling to pieces. In some cases, garments were taken from the dead. John McElroy, a prisoner at Andersonville, recalled "Before one was fairly cold his clothes would be appropriated and divided, and I have seen many sharp fights between contesting claimants".

Although the prison was surrounded by forest, very little wood was allowed to the prisoners for warmth or cooking. This, along with the lack of utensils, made it almost impossible for the prisoners to cook the meager food rations they received, which consisted of poorly milled cornflour. During the summer of 1864, Union prisoners suffered greatly from hunger, exposure and disease. Within seven months, about a third had died from dysentery and scurvy; they were buried in mass graves, the standard practice for Confederate prison authorities at Andersonville. In 1864, the Confederate Surgeon General asked Joseph Jones, an expert on infectious disease, to investigate the high mortality rate at the camp. He concluded that it was due to "scorbutic dysentery" (bloody diarrhea caused by vitamin C deficiency). In 2010, the historian Rosemary Drisdelle said that hookworm disease, a condition not recognized or known during the Civil War, was the major cause of many of the fatalities among the prisoners.

=== Survival and social networks ===
At the time of the Civil War, the concept of a prisoner of war camp was still new. It was not until 1863 that President Lincoln demanded a code of conduct be instituted to guarantee prisoners of war an entitlement to food and medical treatment and to protect them from enslavement, torture and murder. Andersonville did not provide its occupants with these guarantees; the prisoners at Andersonville, without any sort of law enforcement or protections, functioned more closely to a primitive society than a civil one. As such, survival often depended on the strength of a prisoner's social network within the prison. A prisoner with friends inside Andersonville was more likely to survive than a lone prisoner. Social networks provided prisoners with food, clothes, shelter, moral support, trading opportunities and protection against other prisoners. One study found that a prisoner having a strong social network within Andersonville "had a statistically significant positive effect on survival probabilities, and that the closer the ties between friends as measured by such identifiers as ethnicity, kinship and the same home town, the bigger the effect."

=== The Raiders ===
A group of prisoners, calling themselves the Andersonville Raiders, attacked their fellow inmates to steal food, jewelry, money and clothing. They were armed mostly with clubs and killed to get what they wanted. Another group started up, organized by Peter "Big Pete" Aubrey, to stop the larceny, calling themselves "Regulators". They caught nearly all of the Raiders, who were tried by the Regulators' judge, Peter McCullough, and a jury, selected from a group of new prisoners. This jury, upon finding the Raiders guilty, set punishment that included running the gauntlet, being sent to the stocks, ball and chain and, in six cases, hanging.

The conditions were so poor that in July 1864, Captain Henry Wirz paroled five Union soldiers to deliver a petition signed by the majority of Andersonville's prisoners asking that the Union reinstate prisoner exchanges (Note: Which had been halted by orders of General Grant after a company of Union Colored soldiers were sold into slavery by Confederate officials instead of being exchanged for Confederate POWs held by the Union.) to relieve the overcrowding and allow prisoners to leave these terrible conditions. That request was denied. The petitioners, who had sworn to return, reported this to their comrades.

=== Deaths ===
During the war, 45,000 prisoners were received at Andersonville prison; of these nearly 13,000 died. The nature and causes of the deaths are a source of controversy among historians. Some contend that the deaths resulted from Confederate policy and were war crimes against Union prisoners, while others state that they resulted from disease promoted by severe overcrowding, the widespread food shortage in the Confederate States, the prison officials' incompetence, and the breakdown of the prisoner exchange system, caused by the Confederacy's refusal to include black Union troops in the exchanges. The stockade became severely overcrowded.

During the war, disease was the primary cause of death in both armies. Infectious disease was a chronic problem, due to poor sanitation in regular as well as prison camps.

=== Dorence Atwater ===
A young Union prisoner, Dorence Atwater, was chosen to record the names and numbers of the dead at Andersonville, for use by the Confederacy and the federal government after the war ended. He believed, correctly, the federal government would never see the list. Therefore, he sat next to Henry Wirz, who was in charge of the prison pen, and secretly kept his own list among other papers. When Atwater was released, he put the list in his bag and took it through the lines without being caught. It was published by the New York Tribune when Horace Greeley, the paper's owner, learned the federal government had refused the list and given Atwater much grief. Atwater believed that the commanding officer Wirz had been trying to ensure that Union prisoners would be rendered unfit to fight if they survived the prison.

=== Newell Burch ===
Prisoner of war Newell Burch also recorded Andersonville's poor conditions in his diary. A member of the 154th New York Volunteer Infantry, Logan was captured on the first day of the Battle of Gettysburg; he was first imprisoned at Belle Isle in Richmond, Virginia and then Andersonville. He is credited with having been the longest-held Union prisoner of war during the Civil War, having survived a total of 661 days in Confederate hands. His diary is in the collection of the Dunn County Historical Society in Menomonie, Wisconsin; a mimeographed copy is held by the Wisconsin Historical Society.

=== Prisoner population ===
Date	Population
April 1, 1864	7,163
May 5, 1864	12,002
June 13, 1864	20,654
June 19, 1864	23,944
July 18, 1864	29,078
July 31, 1864	31,680
August 31, 1864	31,695

== Escapes ==
Planning an escape from this camp was routine among the thousands of prisoners. Most men formed units to burrow out of the camp using tunnels. The locations of the tunnels would aim towards nearby forests fifty feet from the wall. Once out, escape was nearly impossible due to the poor health of prisoners. Prisoners caught trying to escape were denied rations, chain ganged, or killed. Playing dead was another method of escape. The death rate of the camp being around a hundred per day made disposing of bodies a relaxed procedure by the guards. Prisoners would pretend to be dead and carried out to the row of dead bodies outside of the walls. As soon as night fell the men would get up and run. Once Wirz learned of this practice he ordered an examination by surgeons on all bodies taken out of the camp.

Confederate records show that 351 prisoners (about 0.7% of all inmates) escaped, though many were recaptured. The US Army lists 32 as returning to Union lines; of the rest, some likely simply returned to civilian life without notifying the military, while others probably died.

== Evaluation by Confederate government ==
=== August 1864: Visit by prison inspector ===
In August 1864, Confederate prison inspector Daniel Chandler visited the camp and immediately determined that the prisoners were being kept in inhumane conditions. He accused General John H. Winder of purposeful negligence and demanded that Winder be replaced. Winder considered Chandler's report an insult to his Southern honor and accused Chandler of having a misplaced and "unbecoming" sympathy for Union soldiers.

=== September 1864: Prisoner release ===
In the latter part of the summer of 1864, the Confederacy offered to conditionally release prisoners if the Union would send ships to retrieve them (Andersonville is inland, with access possible only via rail and road). In the autumn of 1864, after the Battle of Atlanta, all the prisoners who were well enough to be moved were sent to Florence Stockade (near Florence, South Carolina) and Camp Lawton (near Millen, Georgia). At Millen, better arrangements prevailed, and prisoners were transported by rail to the port of Savannah. After General William Tecumseh Sherman began his march to the sea and destroyed Millen, the remaining prisoners were returned to Andersonville.

== Liberation ==
Andersonville Prison was liberated by the Union Army in May 1865, with the prisoners inside being found and described as "human skeletons amid hellish scenes of desolation".

== Trial ==
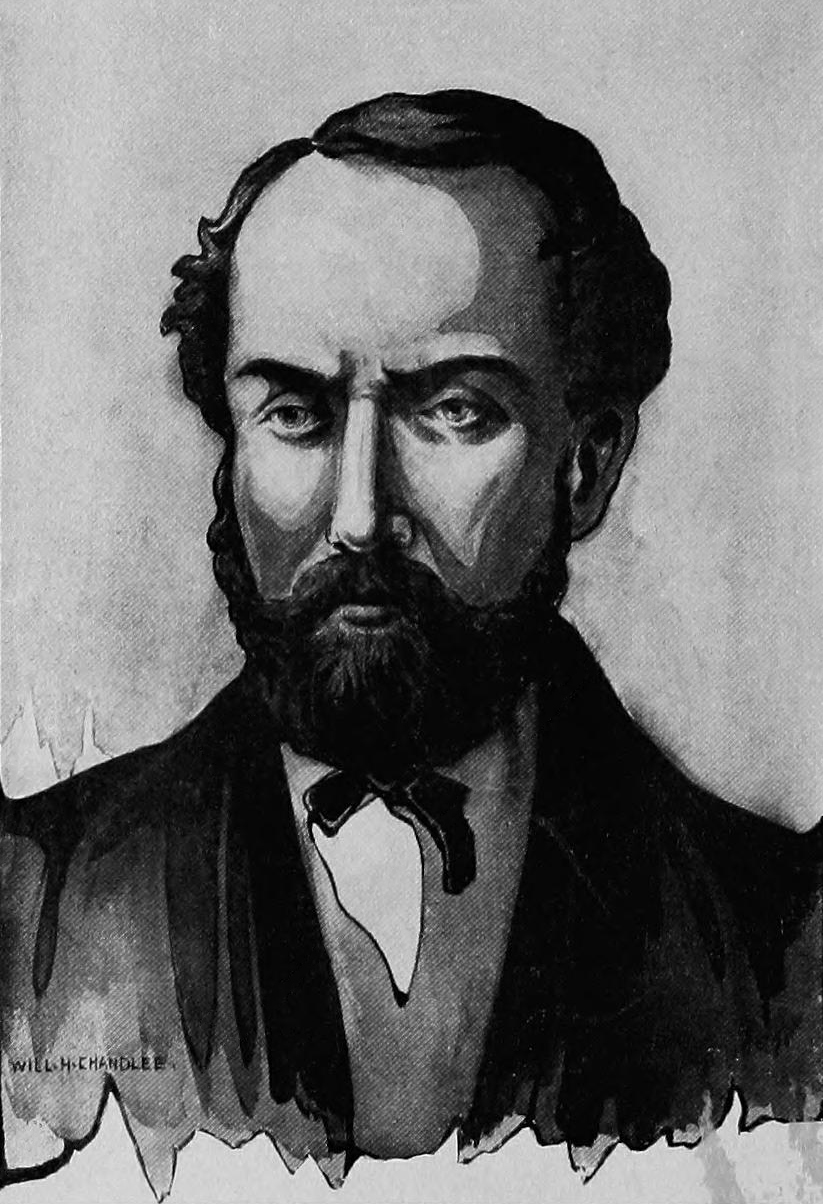
Capt. Henry Wirz

After the war, Henry Wirz, commandant of the inner stockade at Camp Sumter, was tried by a military tribunal on charges of war crimes. The trial was presided over by Union General Lew Wallace and featured chief Judge Advocate General (JAG) prosecutor Norton Parker Chipman.

A number of former prisoners testified about conditions at Andersonville, many accusing Wirz of specific acts of cruelty. The court also considered official correspondence from captured Confederate records. Perhaps the most damaging was a letter to the Confederate surgeon general by James Jones, who in 1864 was sent by Richmond to investigate conditions at Camp Sumter. Jones had been appalled by what he found, and reported he vomited twice and contracted influenza from the single hour he had toured the camp. His graphically detailed report to his superiors all but closed the case for the prosecution.

Wirz presented evidence that he had pleaded to Confederate authorities to try to get more food and that he had tried to improve the conditions for the prisoners inside. He was found guilty, and sentenced to death. On November 10, 1865, he was hanged. Wirz was one of three men executed after the war for war crimes and the only Confederate official; the others were guerrillas Champ Ferguson and Henry C. Magruder. The revelation of the prisoners' sufferings was one of the factors that affected public opinion in the North regarding the South after the close of the Civil War.

Contrary to common belief, Wirz was not the only person prosecuted for his actions at Andersonville. James Duncan, who had worked in the quartermaster's office at Camp Sumter, was convicted of manslaughter for allegedly withholding food from some of the prisoners. Duncan had previously been called as a defense witness for Wirz, but was arrested when he arrived to give evidence.

== Aftermath ==
In 1890, the Grand Army of the Republic (GAR), Department of Georgia, bought the site of Andersonville Prison through membership and subscriptions. It found that as their number was growing less year by year, and as it required a great deal of money to keep up the place, it would be better for them to offer it to the Woman's Relief Corps (WRC), the auxiliary to the GAR.

When the WRC was in annual session in St. Paul, Minnesota, in 1896, representatives of the Georgia GAR came before them, and offering the old prison, asked them to accept the gift and keep it from desecration. The women accepted it as a sacred trust, and immediately appointed Lizabeth A. Turner as chairman of a board to beautify the grounds and make a park of them. A house for a caretaker was needed, and as the women did not want to build it within the old stockade, more land was purchased making the acreage within the enclosure about 87 acres (35 ha). A ten-room house was erected, a caretaker installed, and then the tedious process of making a park was begun. Bermuda grass was planted root by root, a pear and pecan orchard set out, and a rose garden planted, with rose bushes sent from almost every state in the Union. Several states were given ground upon which to erect monuments to their dead soldiers. These were Massachusetts, Ohio, Michigan, Rhode Island, and Wisconsin. Turner having died while in discharge of her duty, the WRC also erected a monument to her memory in the park.

In 1910, the site was donated by the WRC to the federal government. In the following year, the memorial tablet set up by the donors was unveiled. Upon the tablet are the names of the incorporators of the WRC as well as the names of the Board of Trustees for 1909-10, and the names of the committee on transfer to the government.

== National Prisoner of War Museum ==
The National Prisoner of War Museum opened in 1998 as a memorial to all American prisoners of war. Exhibits use art, photographs, displays, and video presentations to depict the capture, living conditions, hardships, and experiences of American prisoners of war in all periods. The museum also serves as the park's visitor center.

== Andersonville National Cemetery ==
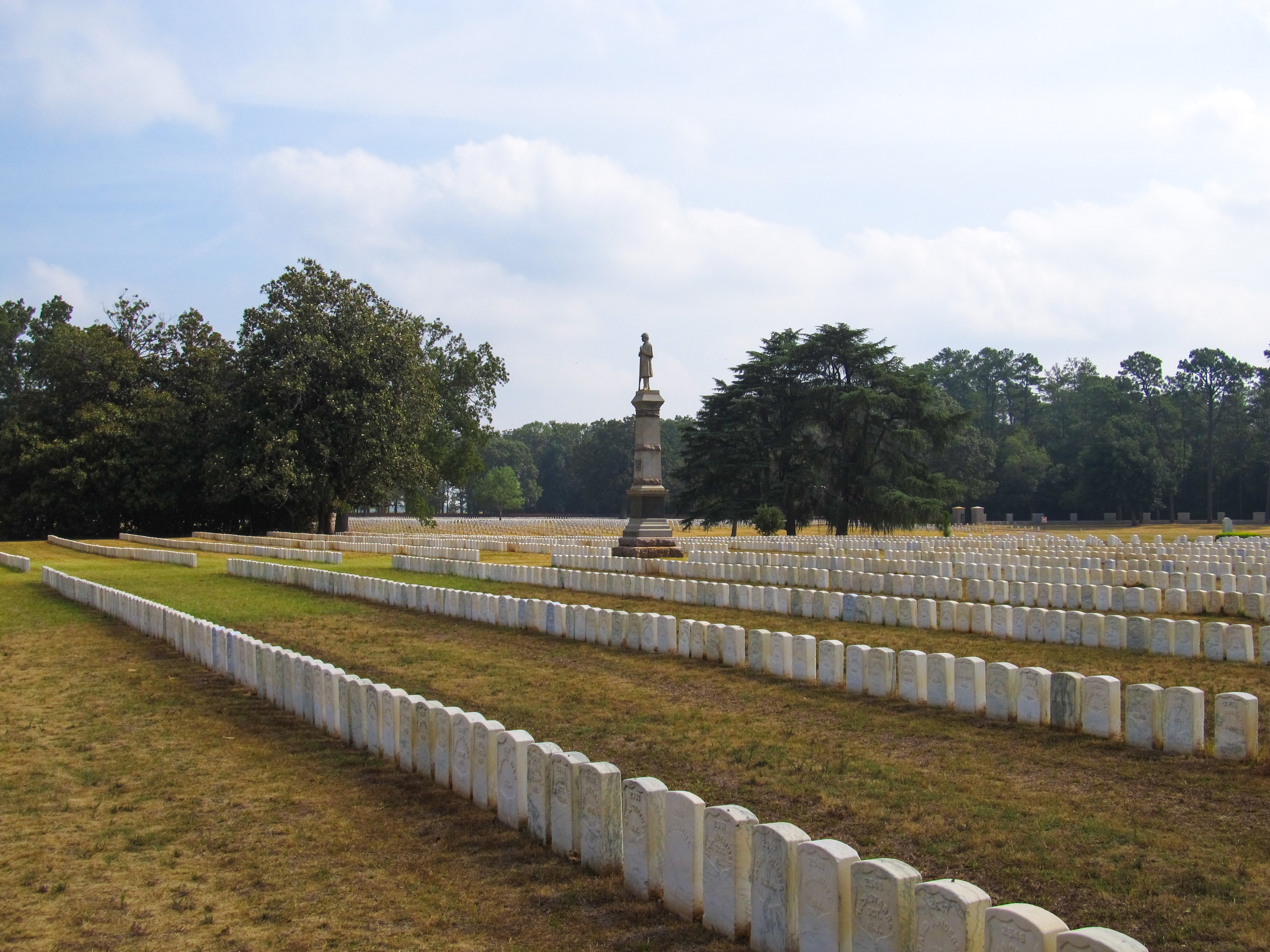
Andersonville National Cemetery, June 2011

The cemetery is the final resting place for the Union prisoners who died while being held at Camp Sumter/Andersonville as POWs. The prisoners' burial ground at Camp Sumter has been made a national cemetery. It contains 13,714 graves, of which 921 are marked "unknown".

As a National Cemetery, it is also used as a burial place for more recent veterans and their dependents.

Visitors can walk the 26.5-acre (10.7 ha) site of Camp Sumter, which has been outlined with double rows of white posts. Two sections of the stockade wall have been reconstructed: the north gate and the northeast corner.

=== Notable interments ===
- Medal of Honor recipients
  - Corporal Luther H. Story, United States Army, recipient for actions September 1, 1950, during the Battle of Yongsan
  - Sergeant James Wiley, Union Army, recipient for actions July 3, 1863, during the Battle of Gettysburg
- Others
  - Colonel Floyd James Thompson, United States Army, prisoner of war for nearly nine years during the Vietnam War; cenotaph

== Depictions ==
- Andersonville (1955) is a novel by MacKinlay Kantor concerning the Andersonville prison. It won the Pulitzer Prize for Fiction in 1956.
- The Andersonville Trial (1970), a PBS television adaptation of a 1959 Broadway play. It depicts the 1865 trial of Andersonville commandant Henry Wirz.
- Andersonvil - Logor smrti (1975), Yugoslav television adaptation of a 1959 Broadway play.
- The Italian western comics series “Tex” includes a three-volumes episode set in the imaginary prisoner-of-war camp Anderville during the American civil war, which is based upon Andersonville.
- The Vigilantes of Love released a song titled "Andersonville" on their 1992 album, Killing Floor.
- The TV movie Andersonville (1996), directed by John Frankenheimer, tells the story of the notorious Confederate prison camp.
- Gene Hackman; Daniel Lenihan (2008). Escape from Andersonville: A Novel of the Civil War. Macmillan. p. 352. ISBN 978-0-312-36373-4.
- Max R. Terman's Hiram's Honor: Reliving Private Terman's Civil War (2009, Hillsboro, KS: TESA Books, ISBN 0-615-27812-4), is an historical novel.
- A novel written in 2014 by Tracy Groot entitled The Sentinels of Andersonville depicts some of the Historical players such as Capt. Henry Wirz and General John Winder and fictional prisoners in Andersonville Prison as rebel neighbors, attempting to help the prisoners, were vilified by the town of Americus, GA.

== Gallery ==
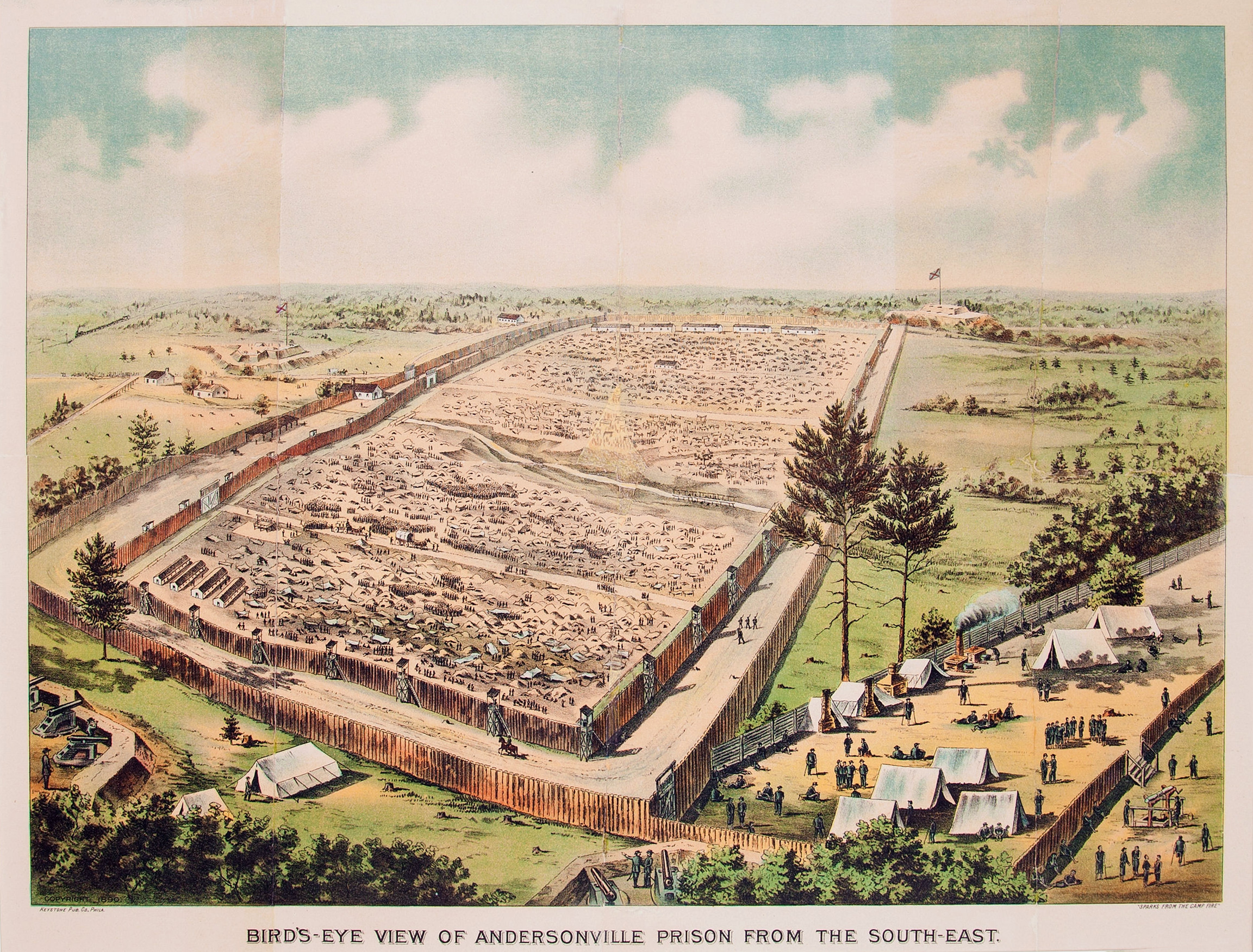
Bird's eye view

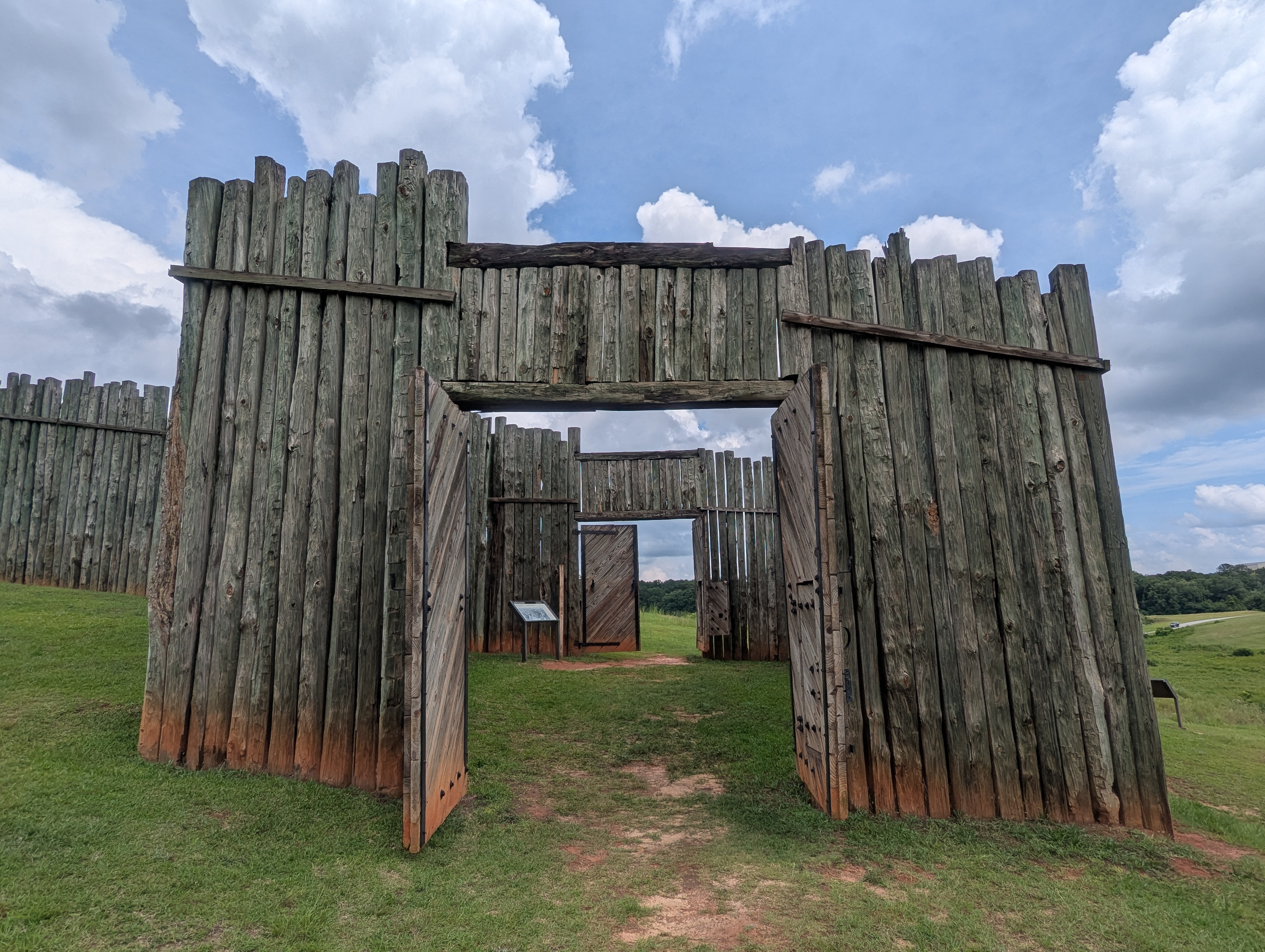
Replica of entrance gate (north)

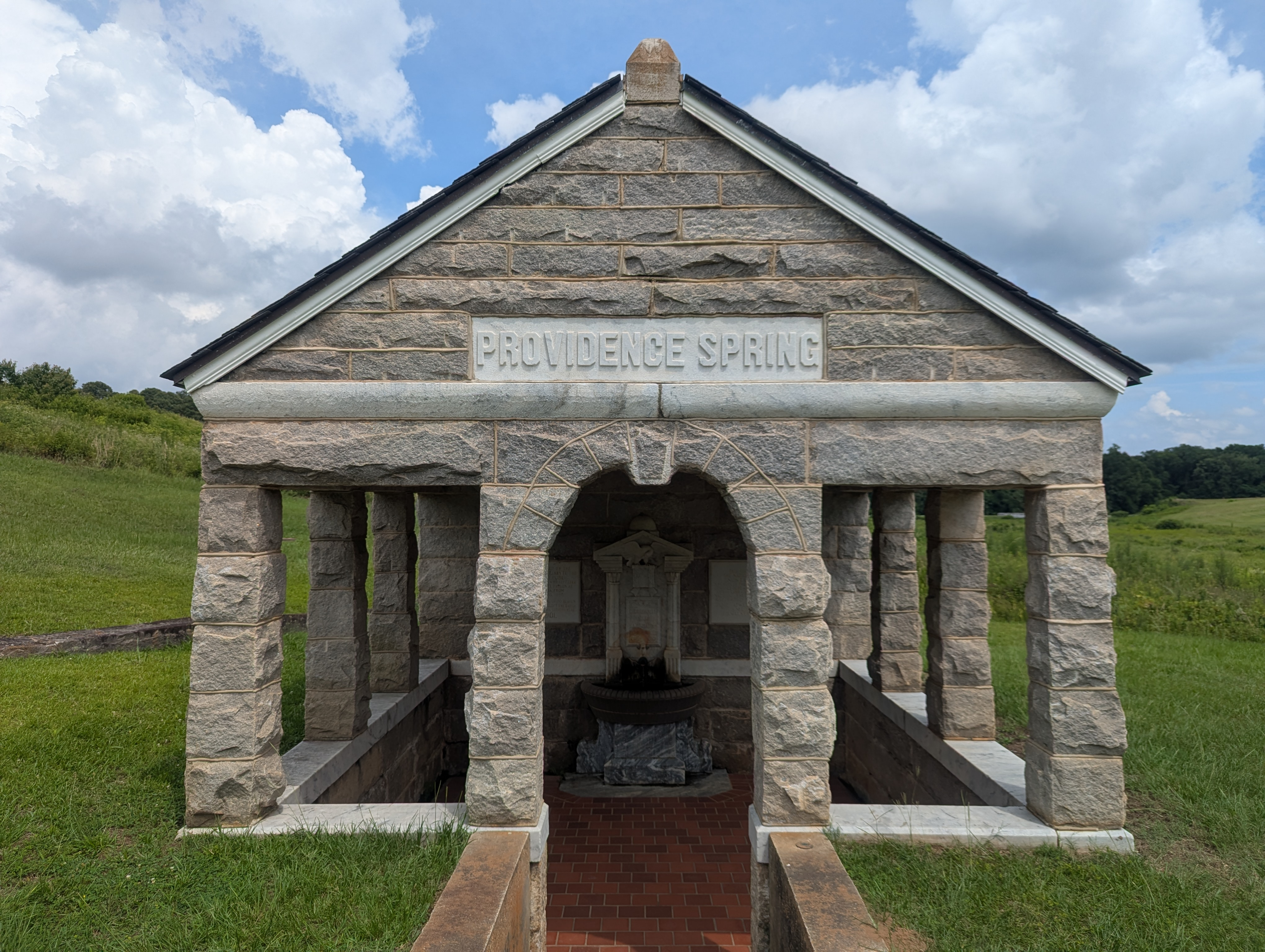
Providence Spring

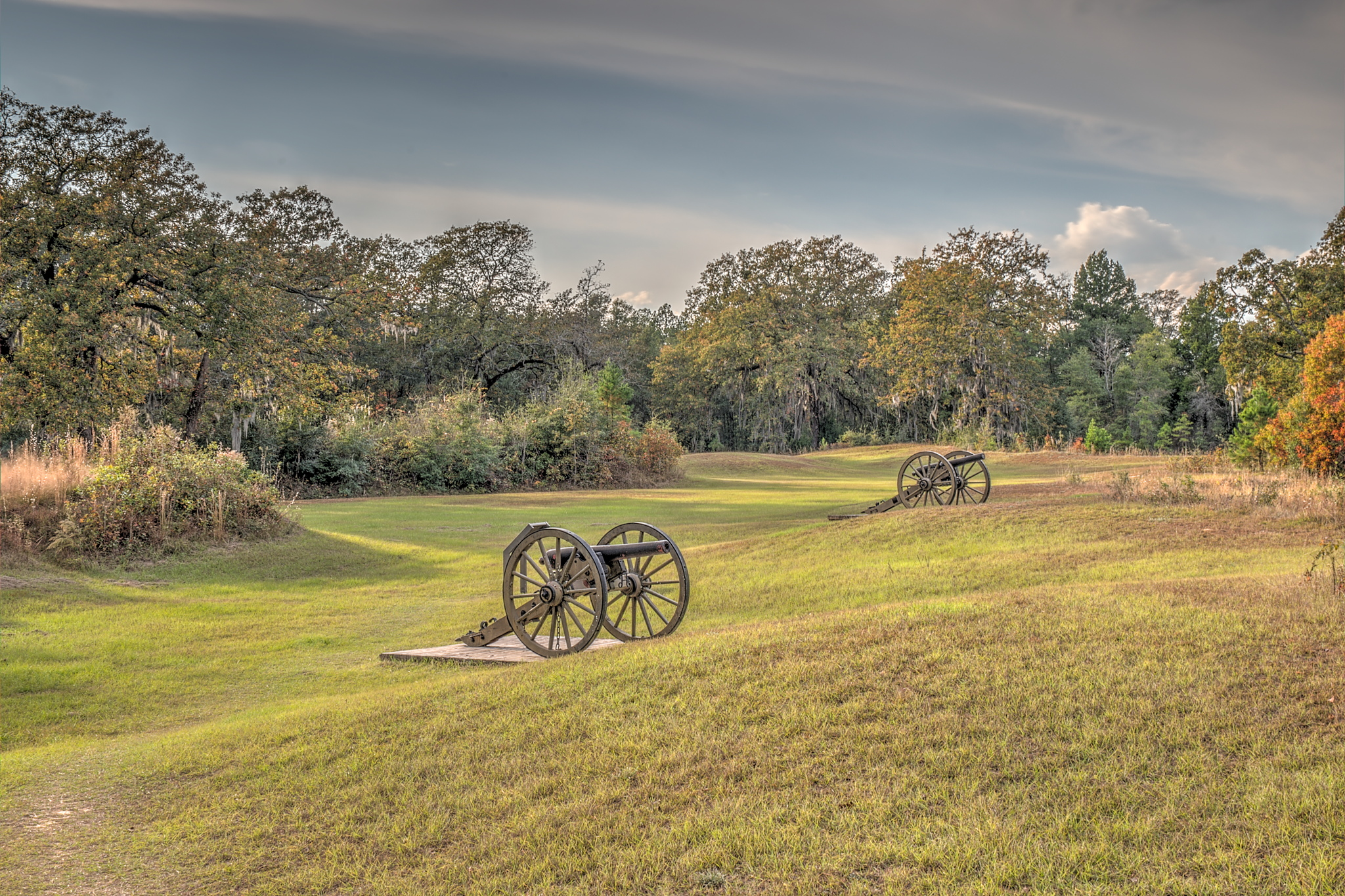
Star Fort

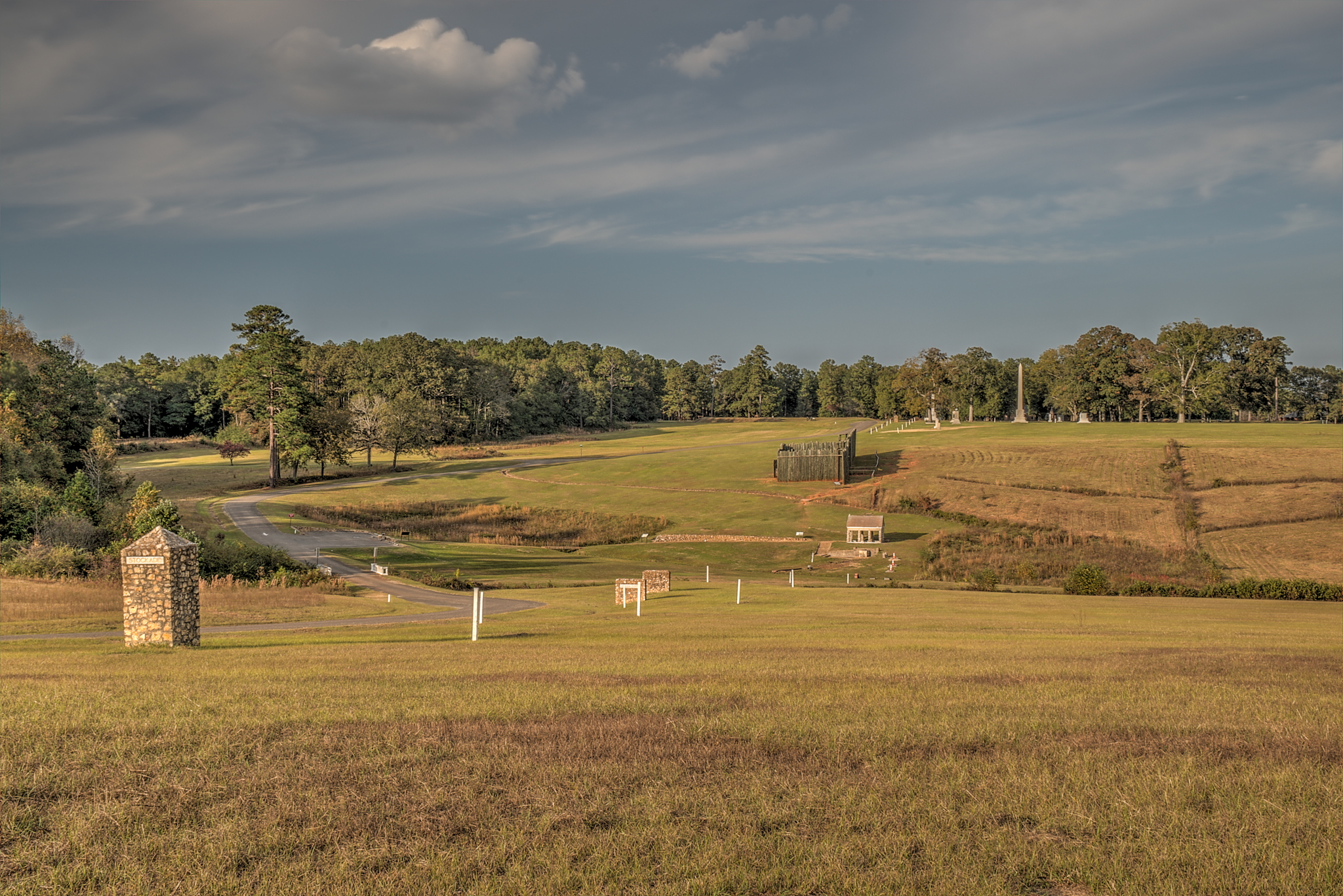
Panoramic view from Star Fort

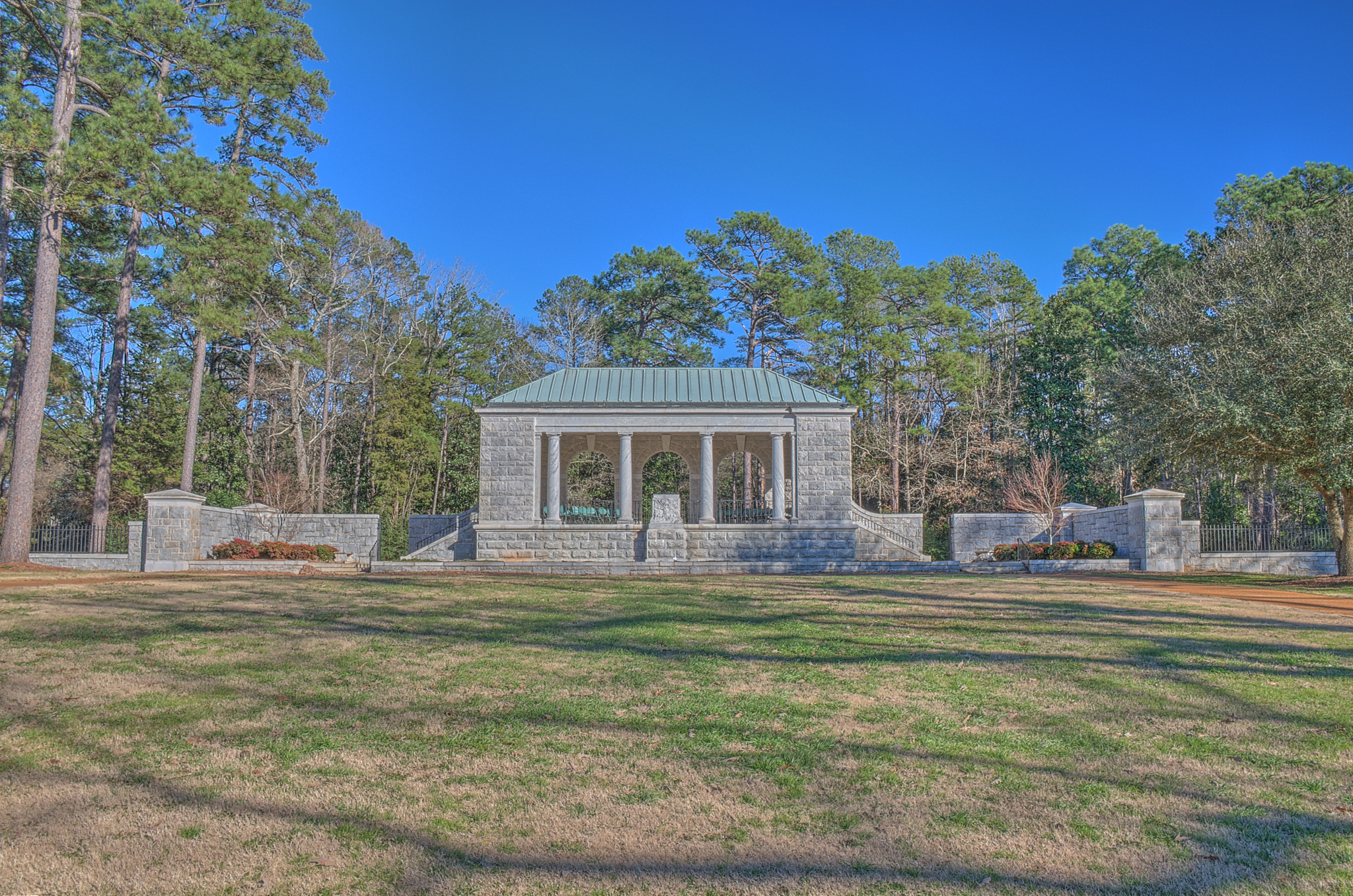
Rostrum

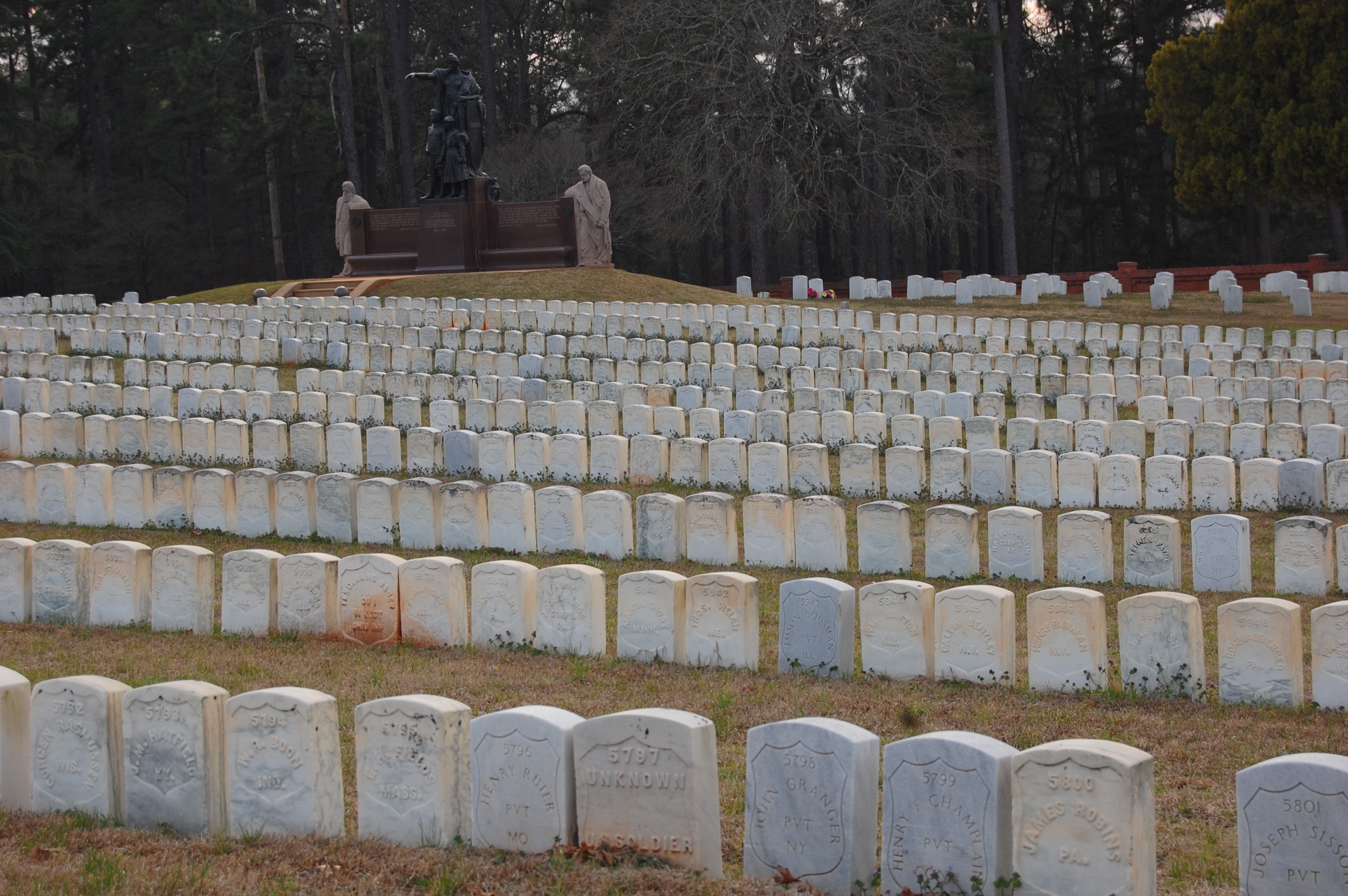
detail of graves

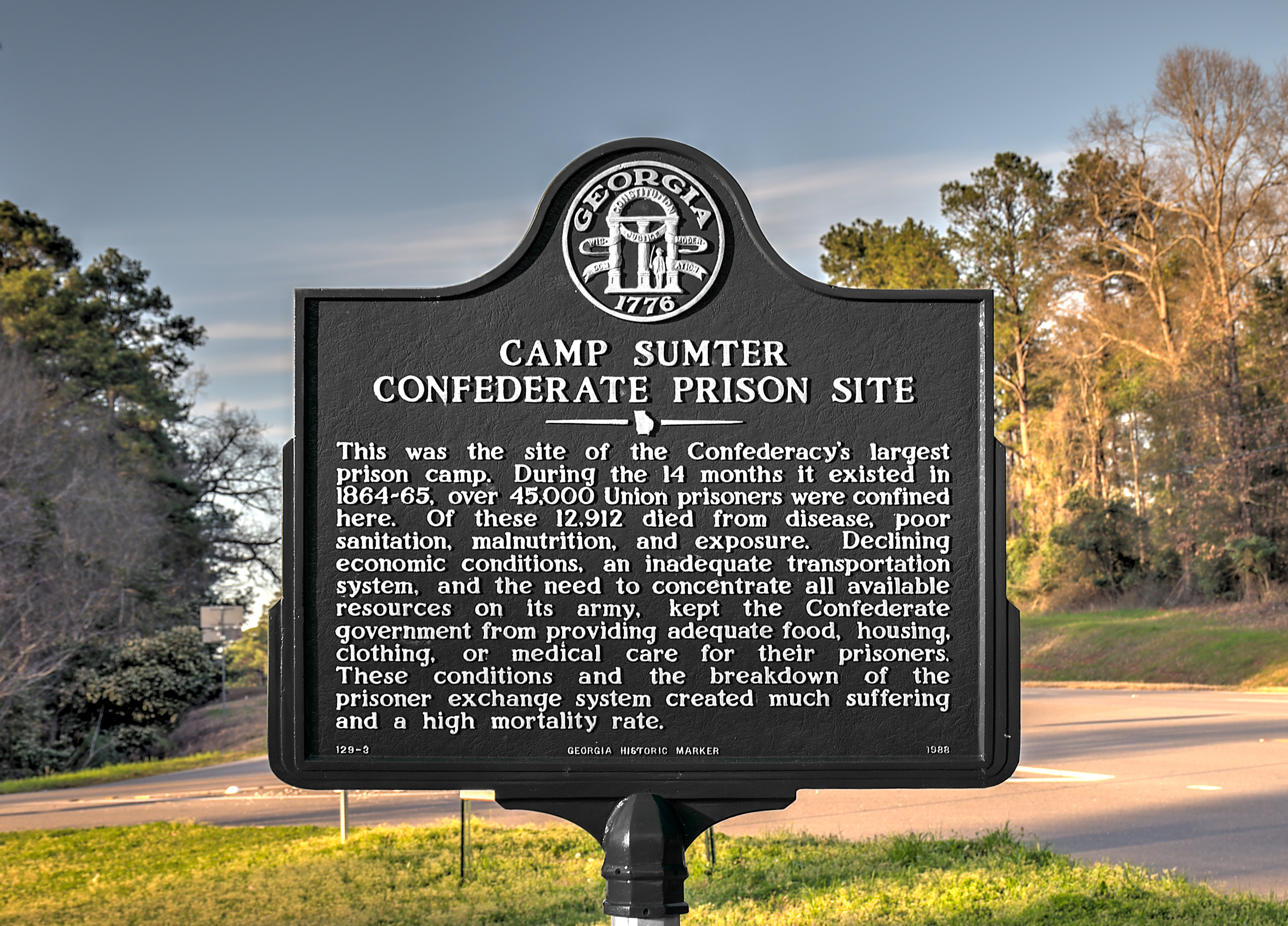
Historical marker

=== Monuments ===
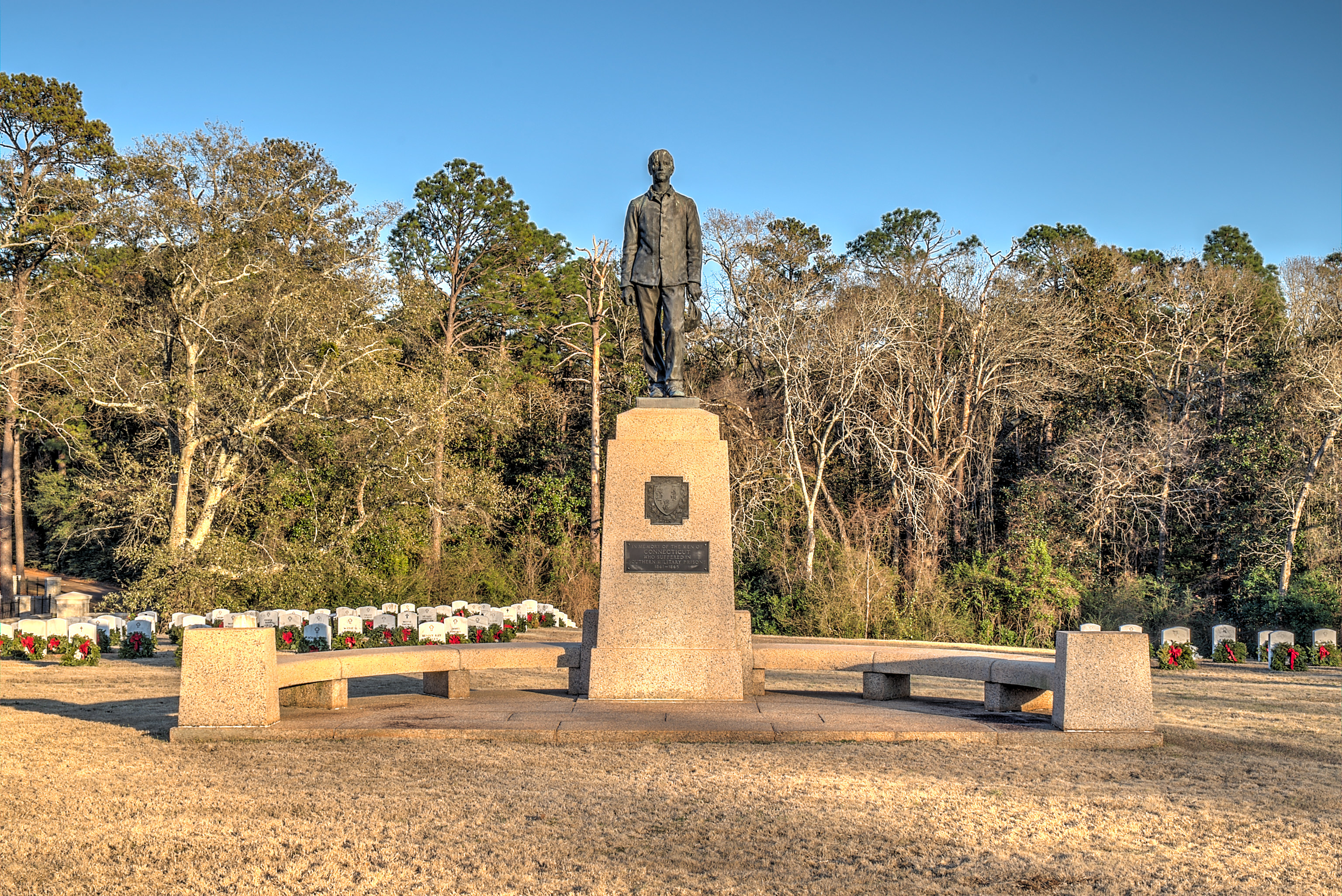
Connecticut (1907)

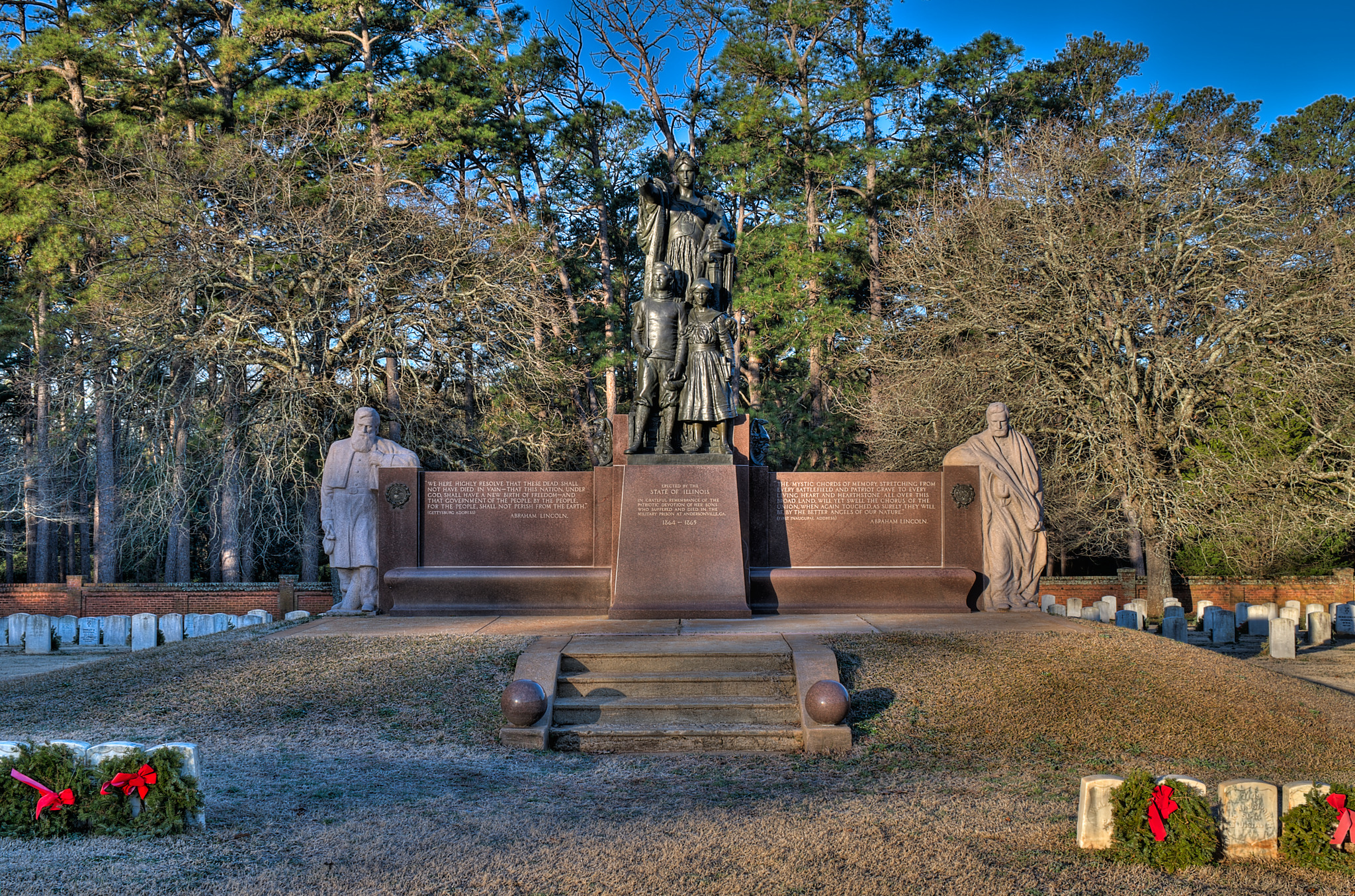
Illinois (1912)

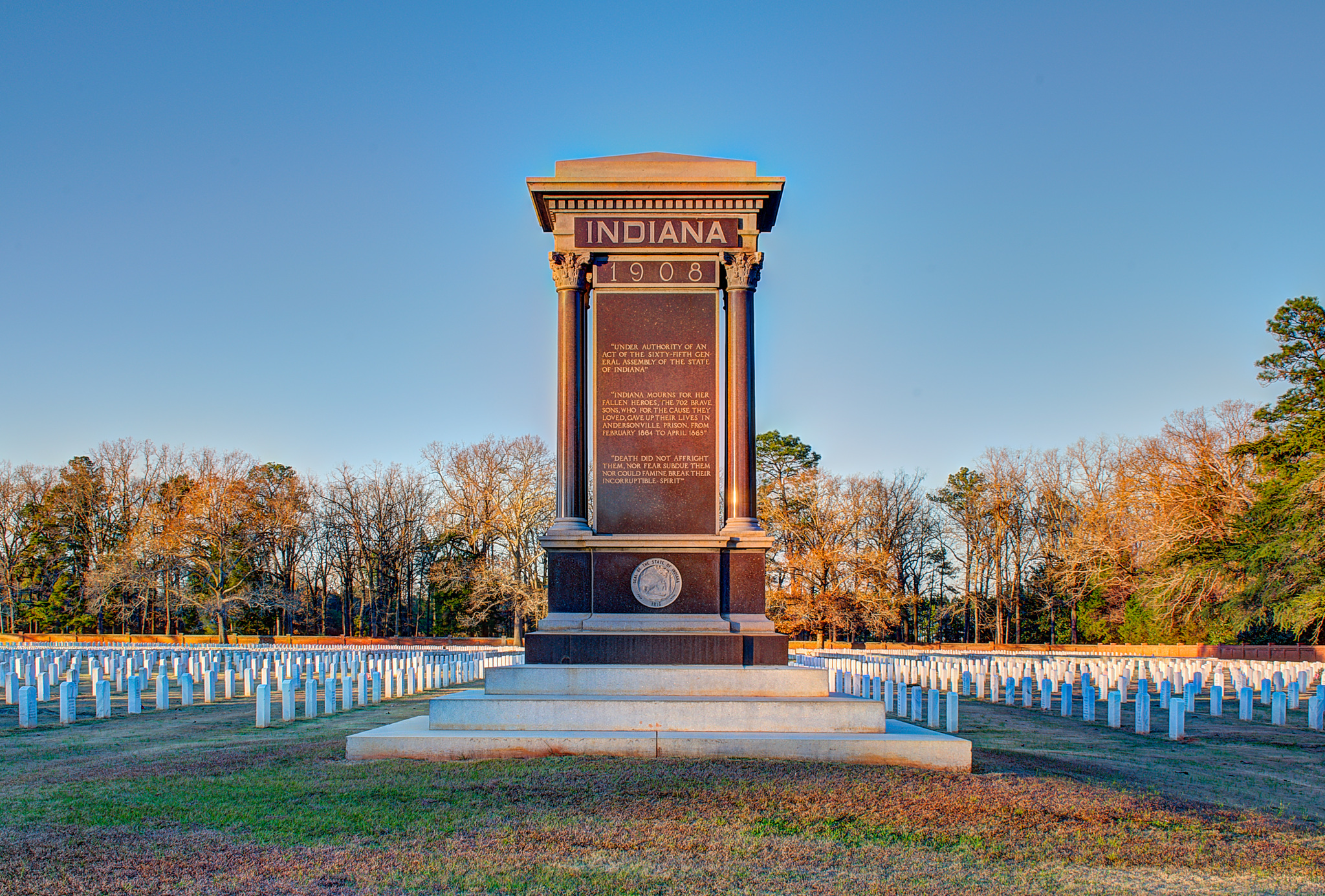
Indiana (1908)

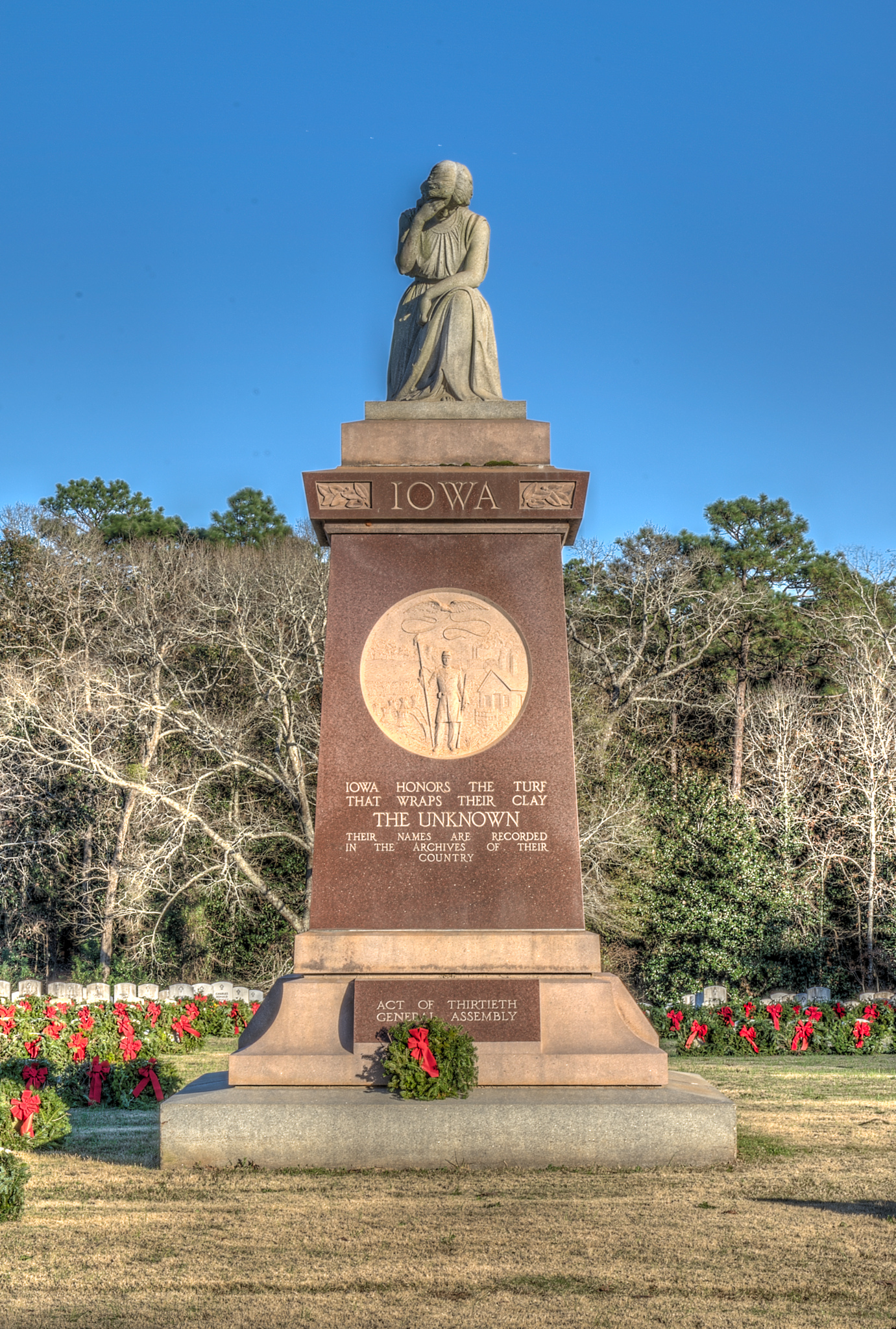
Iowa (1906)

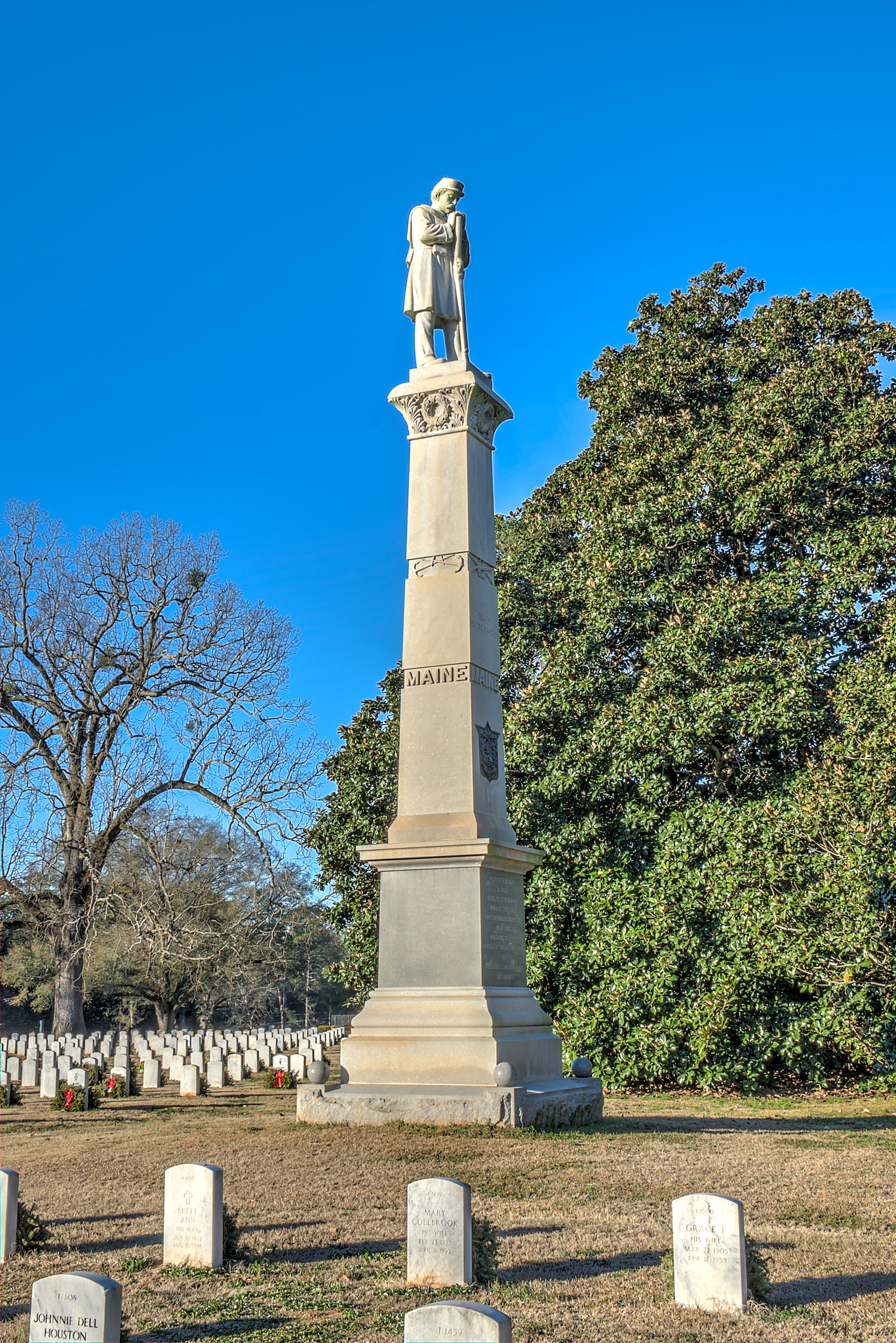
Maine (1904)

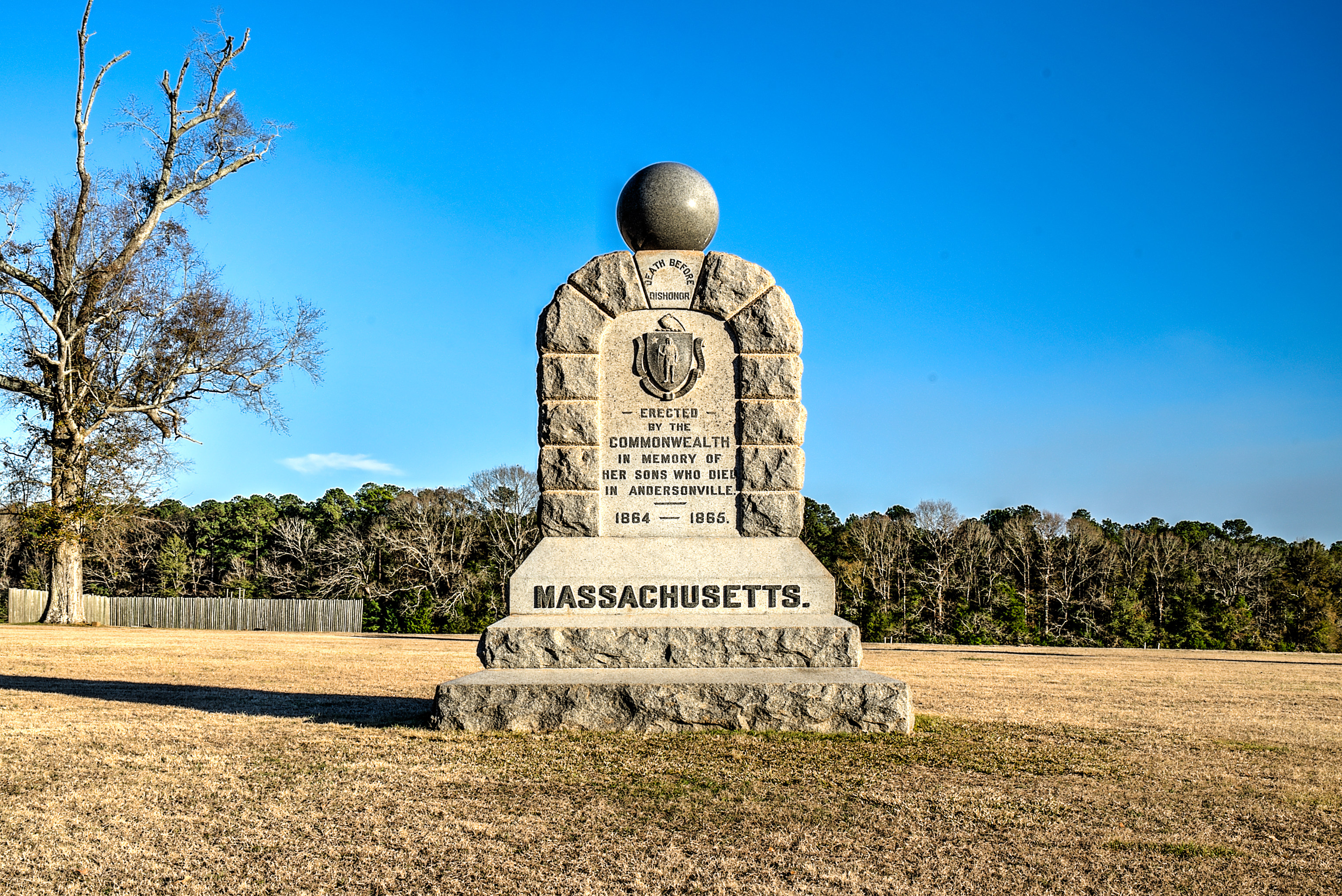
Massachusetts (1901)

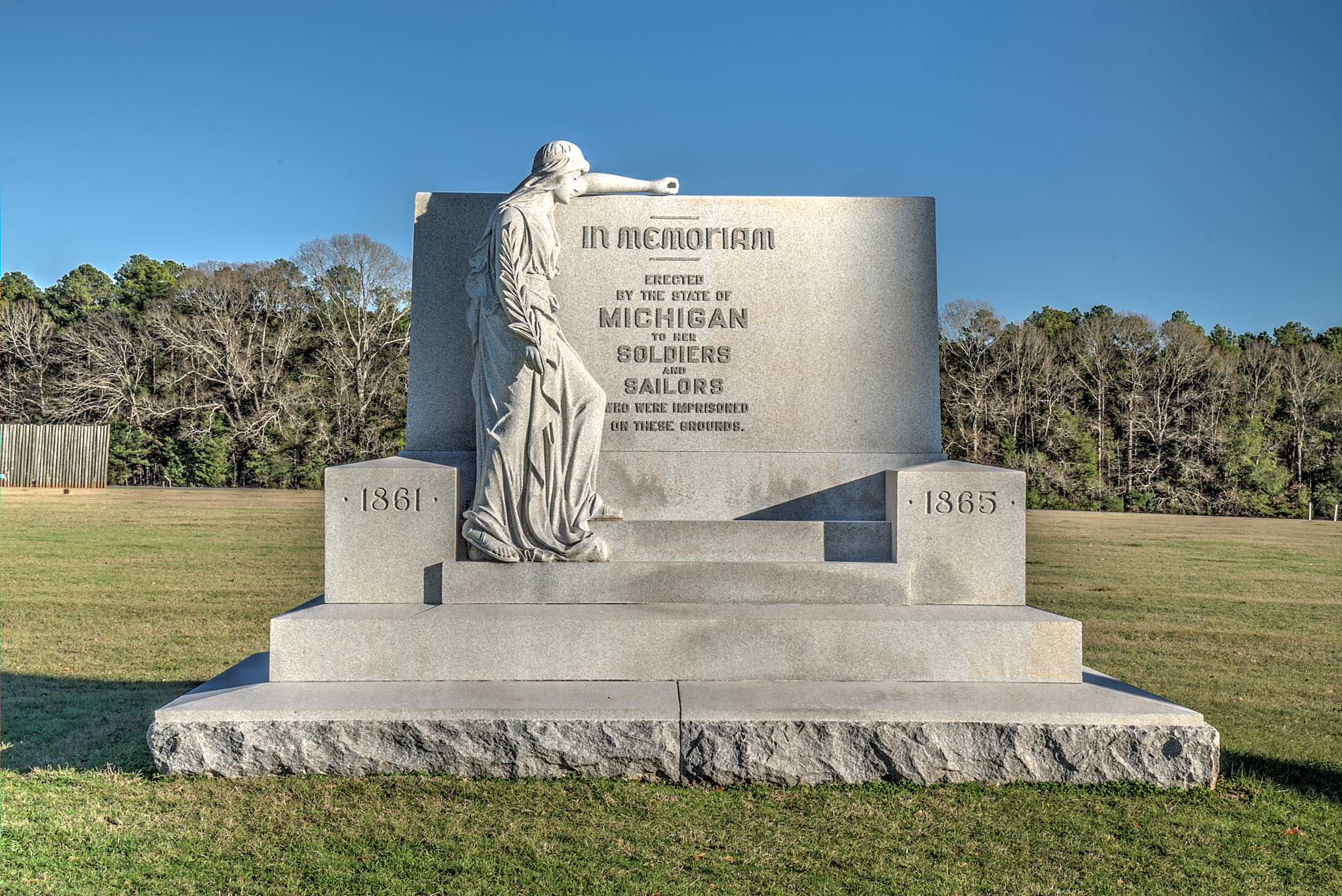
Michigan (1904)

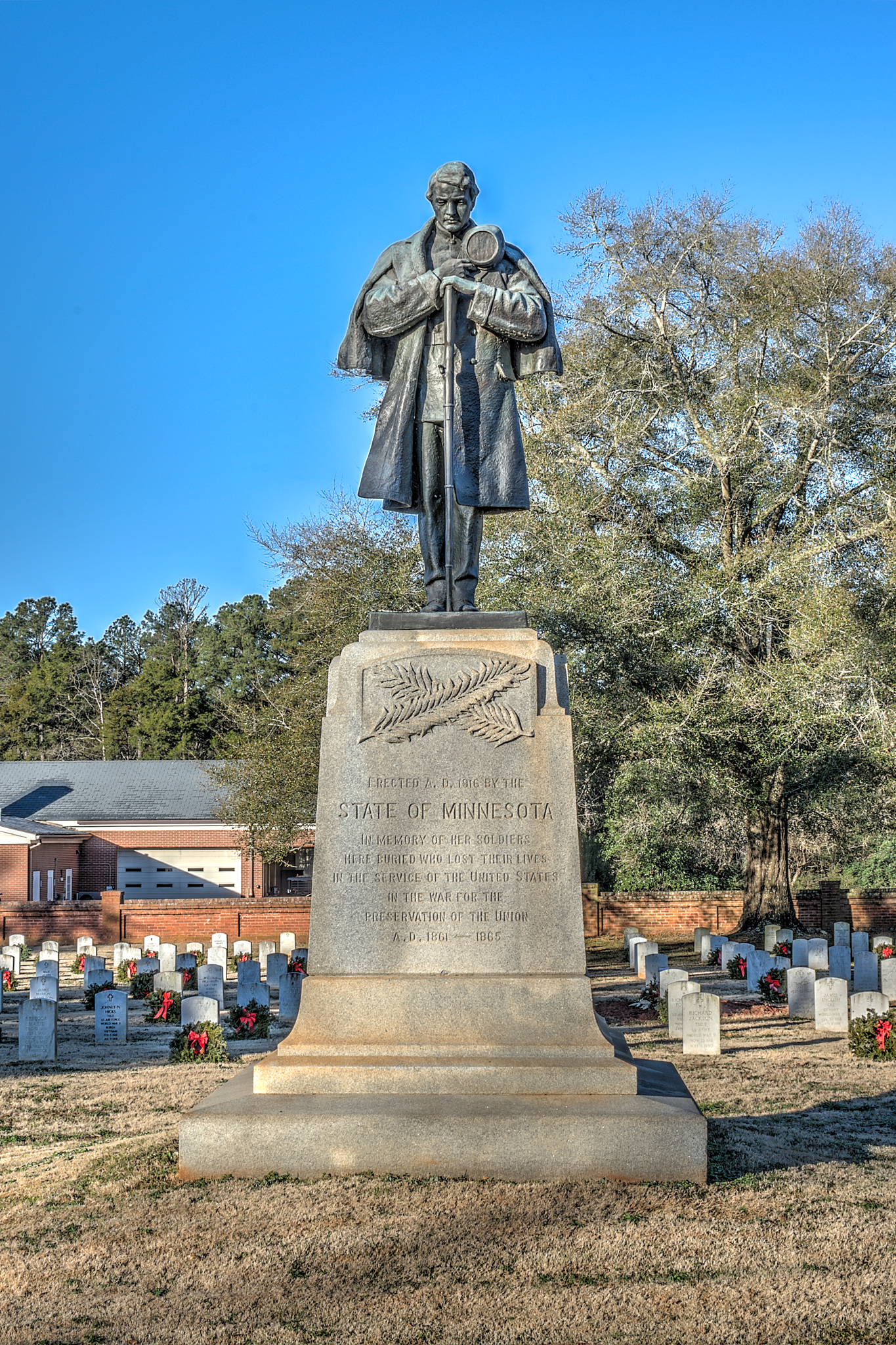
Minnesota (1916)

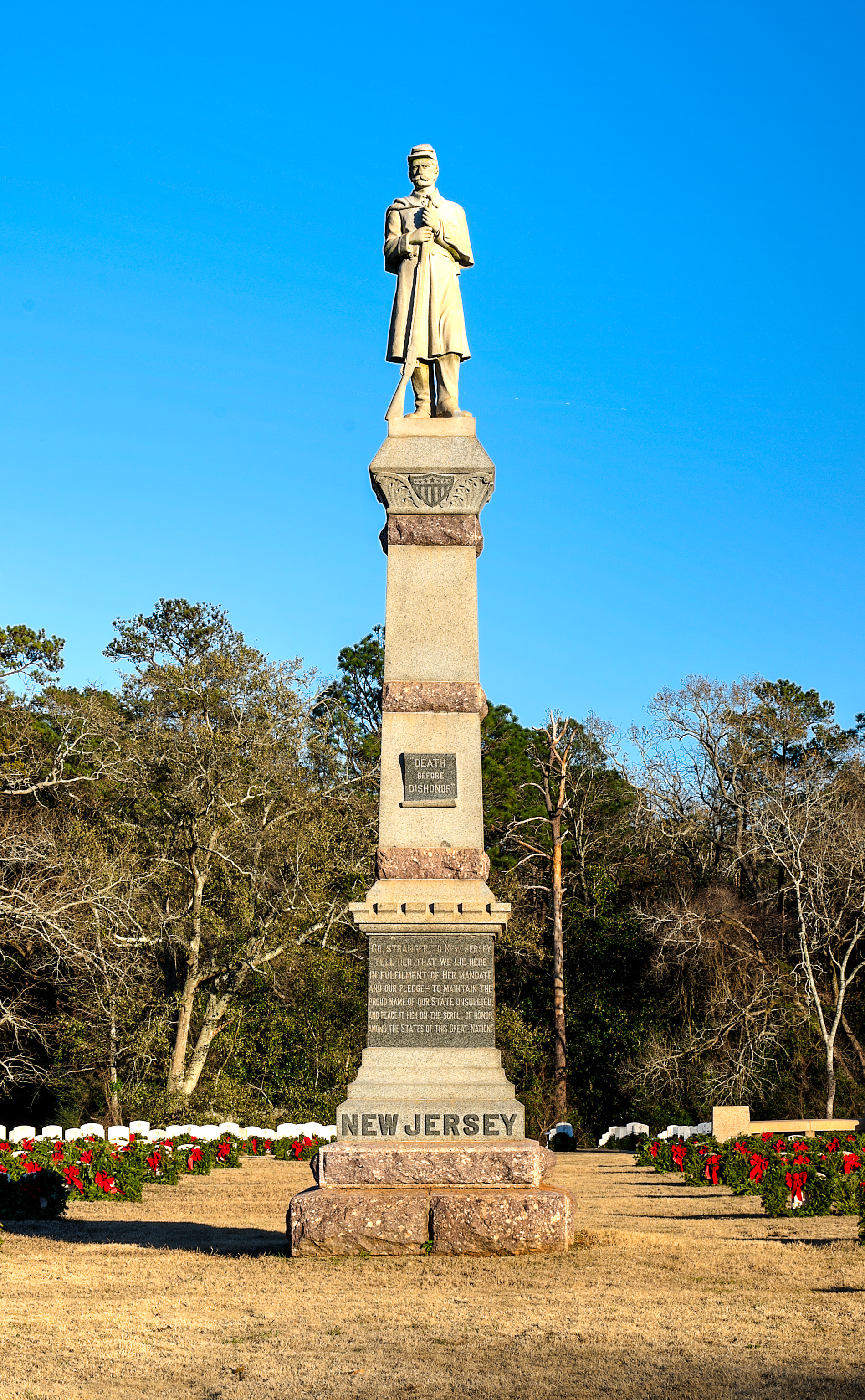
New Jersey (1899)

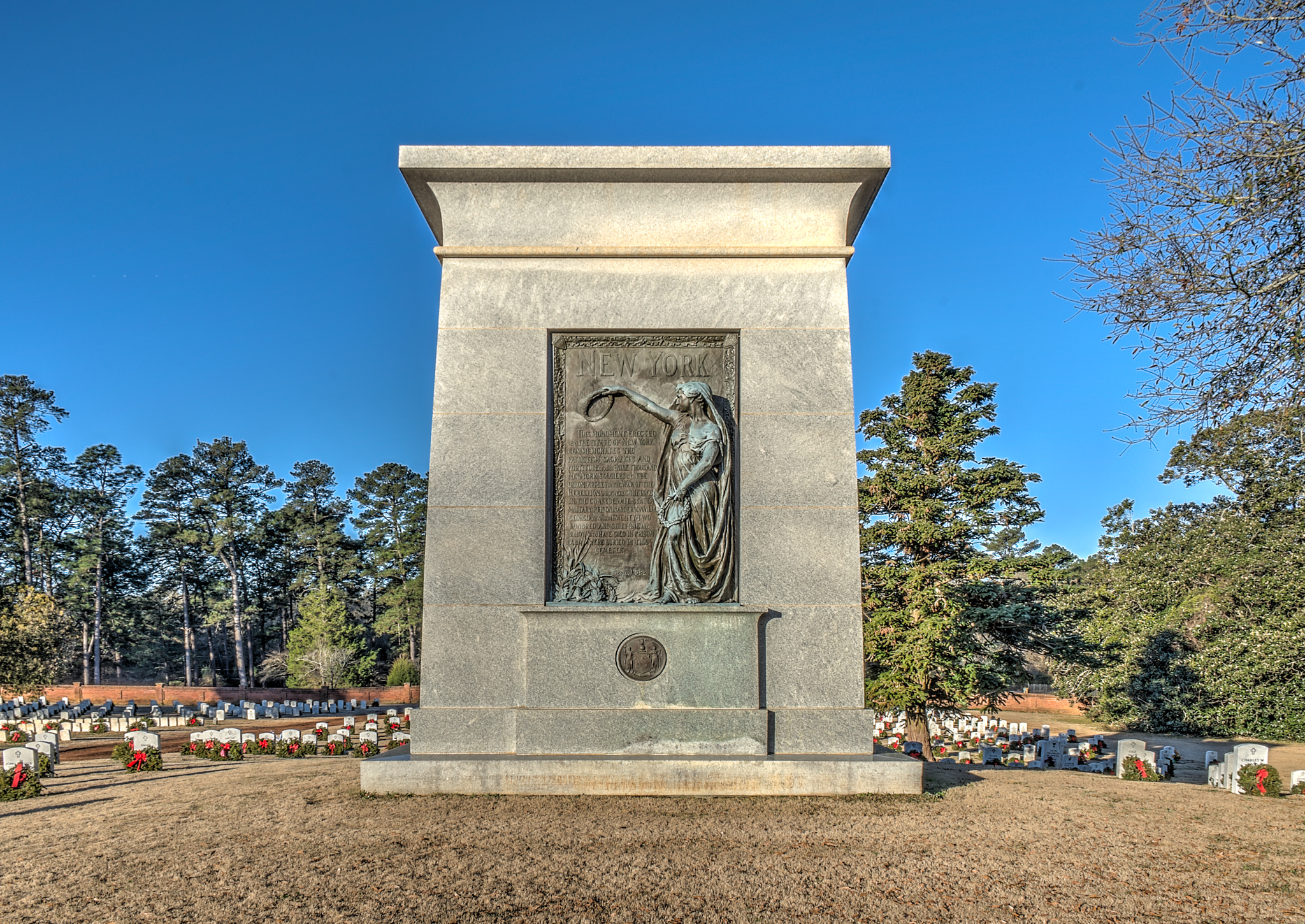
New York (1914)

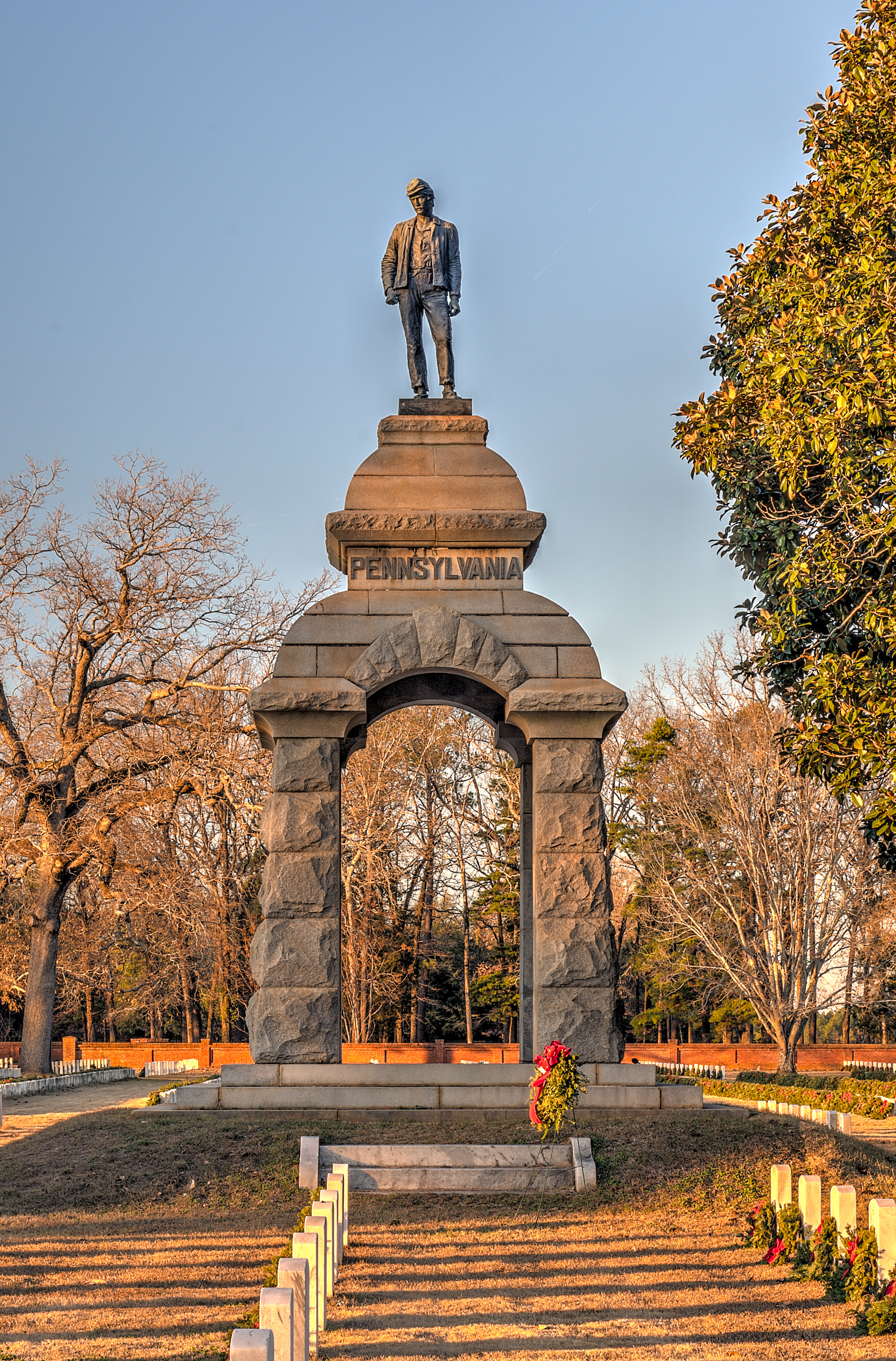
Pennsylvania (1905)

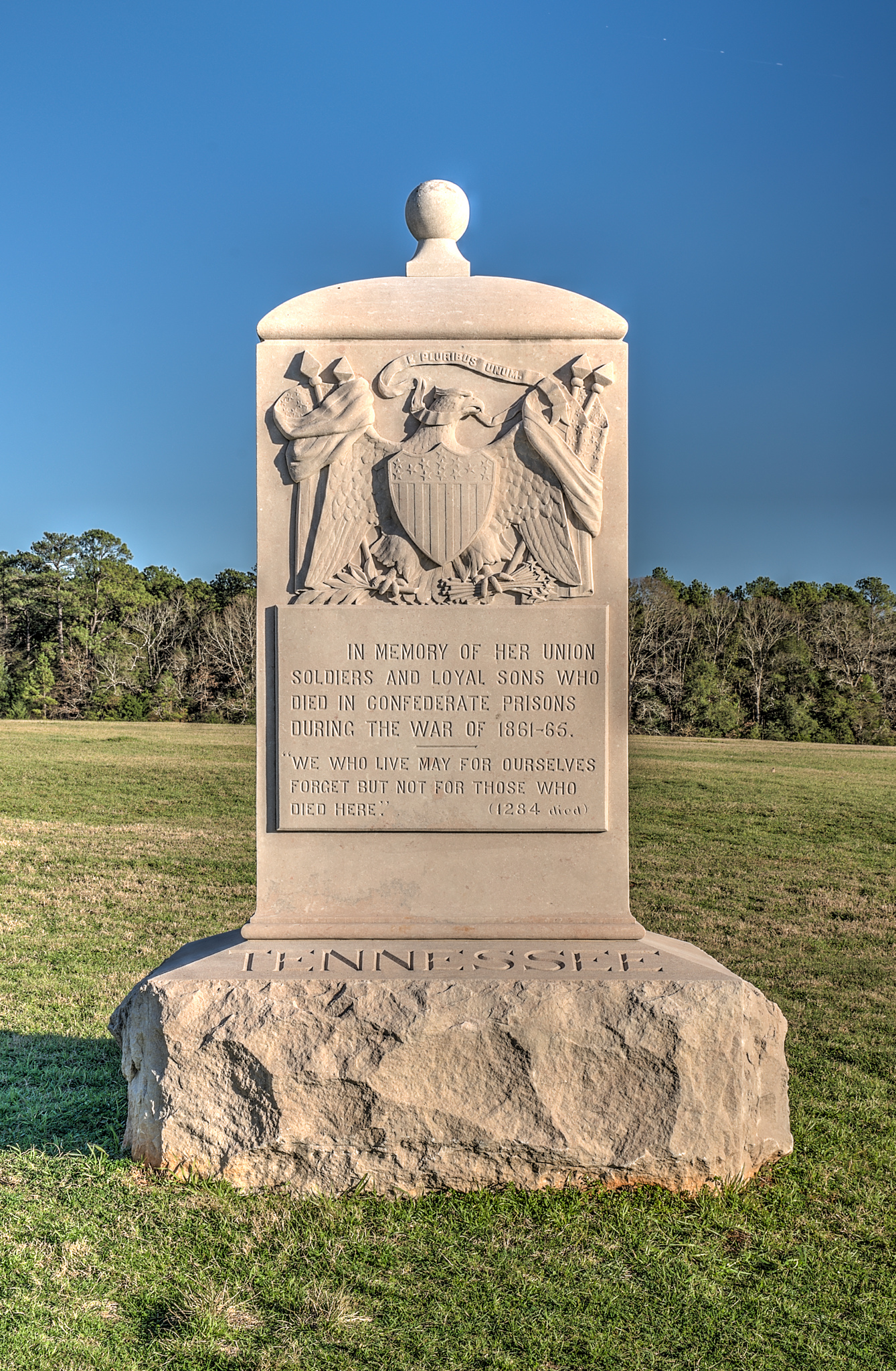
Tennessee (1915)

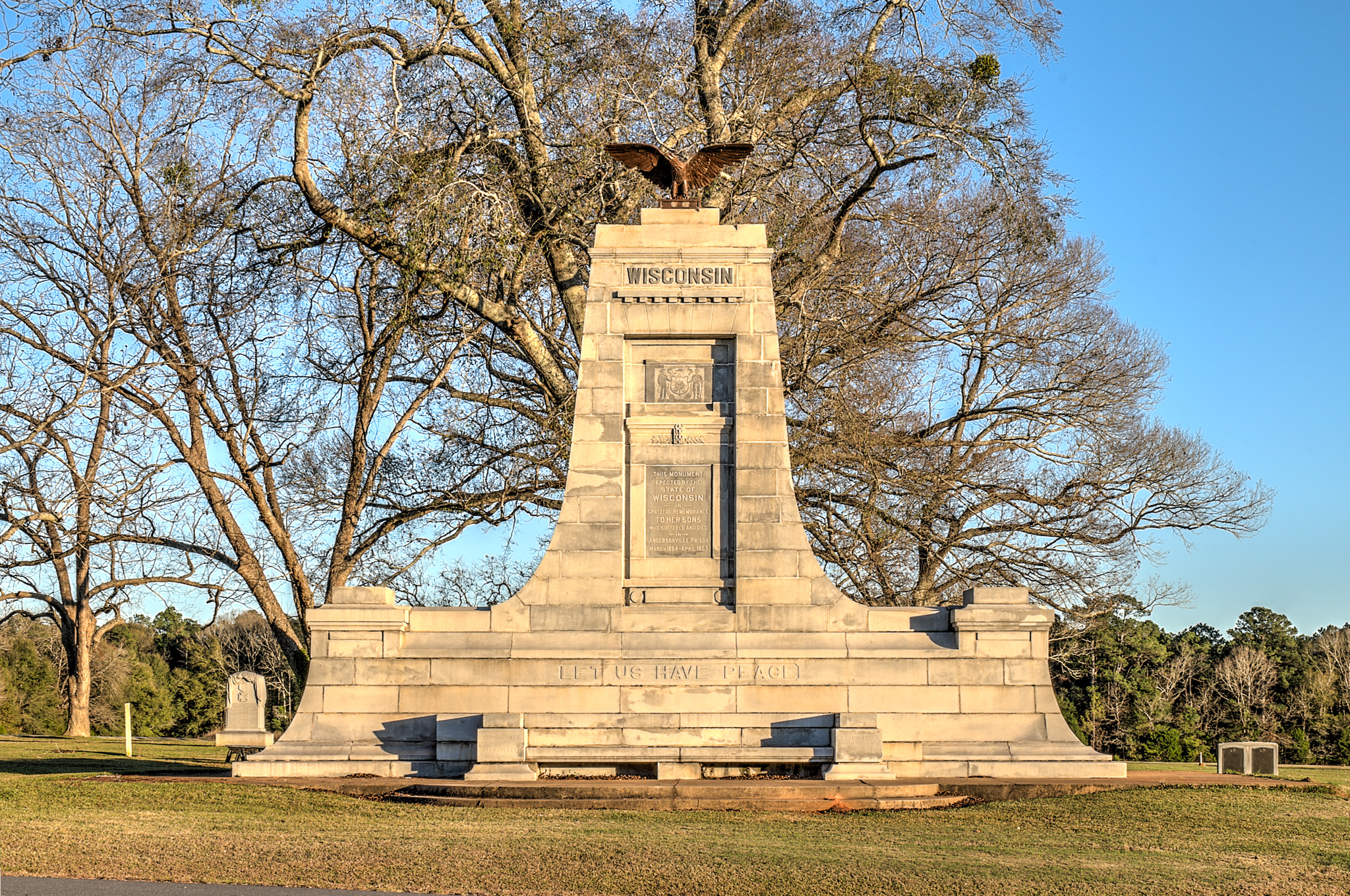
Wisconsin (1907)

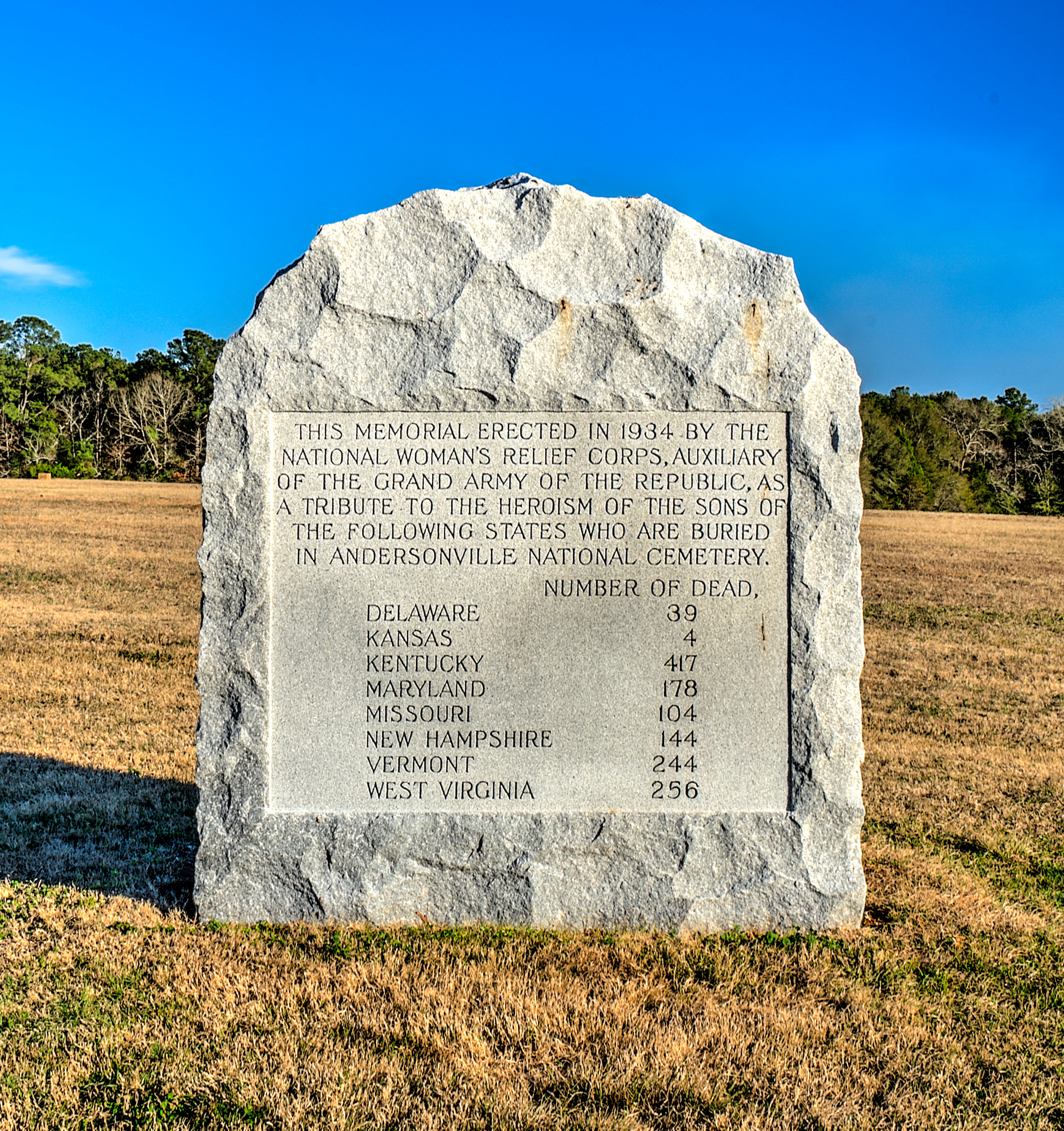
Eight Northern states (1934)

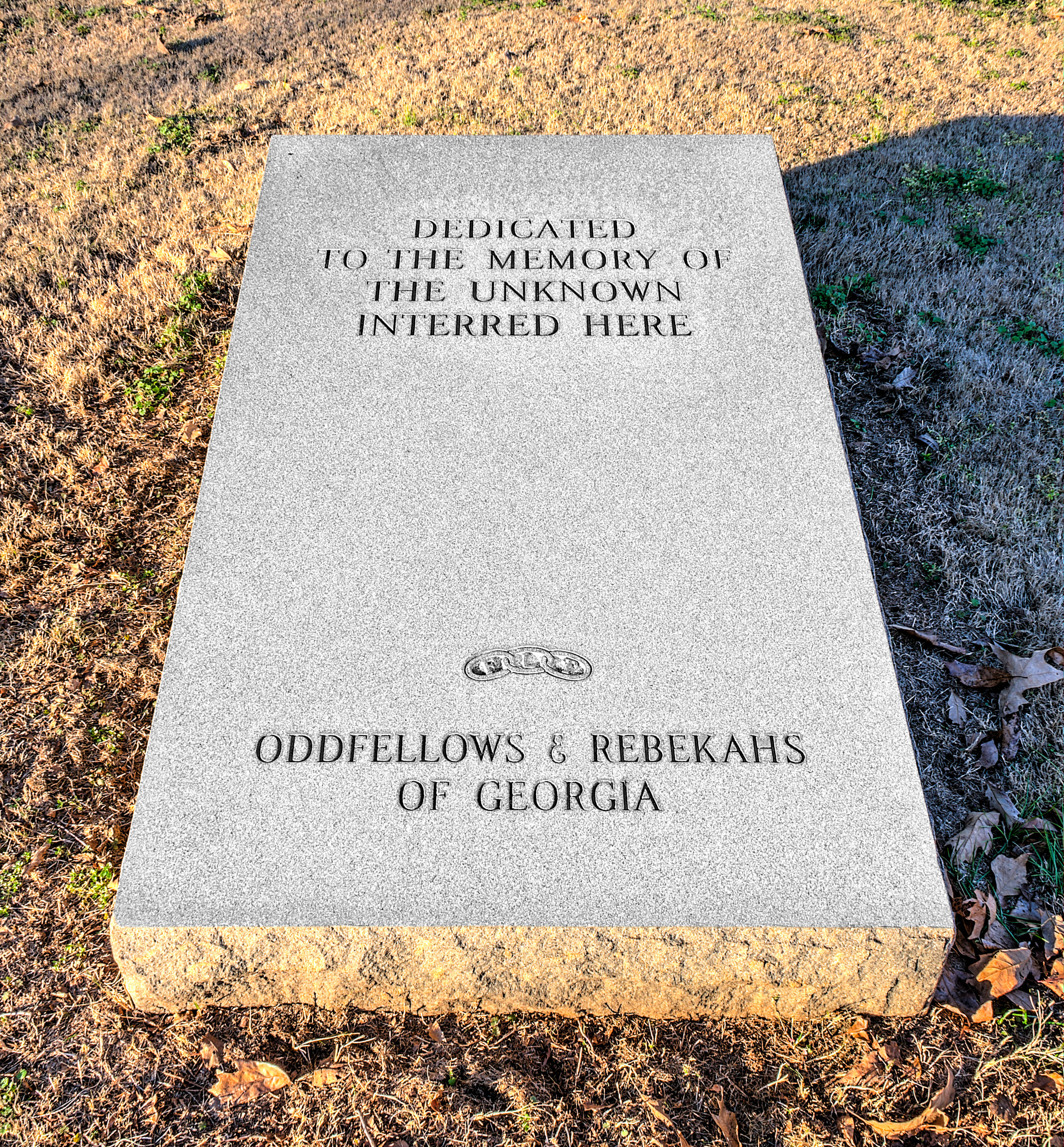
Unknown Soldier (1984)

== See also ==
- American Civil War prison camps
- Camp Douglas
- Dix–Hill Cartel, the agreement reached in July 1862 to regulate prisoner of war exchanges
- Elmira Prison
- Florence Stockade
- Immortal Six Hundred
- Libby Prison
- Camp Lawton
- Salisbury Prison
- Washington Street Military Prison
