= Providence Spring =

Coordinates: 2°11′40″N 84°07′49″W

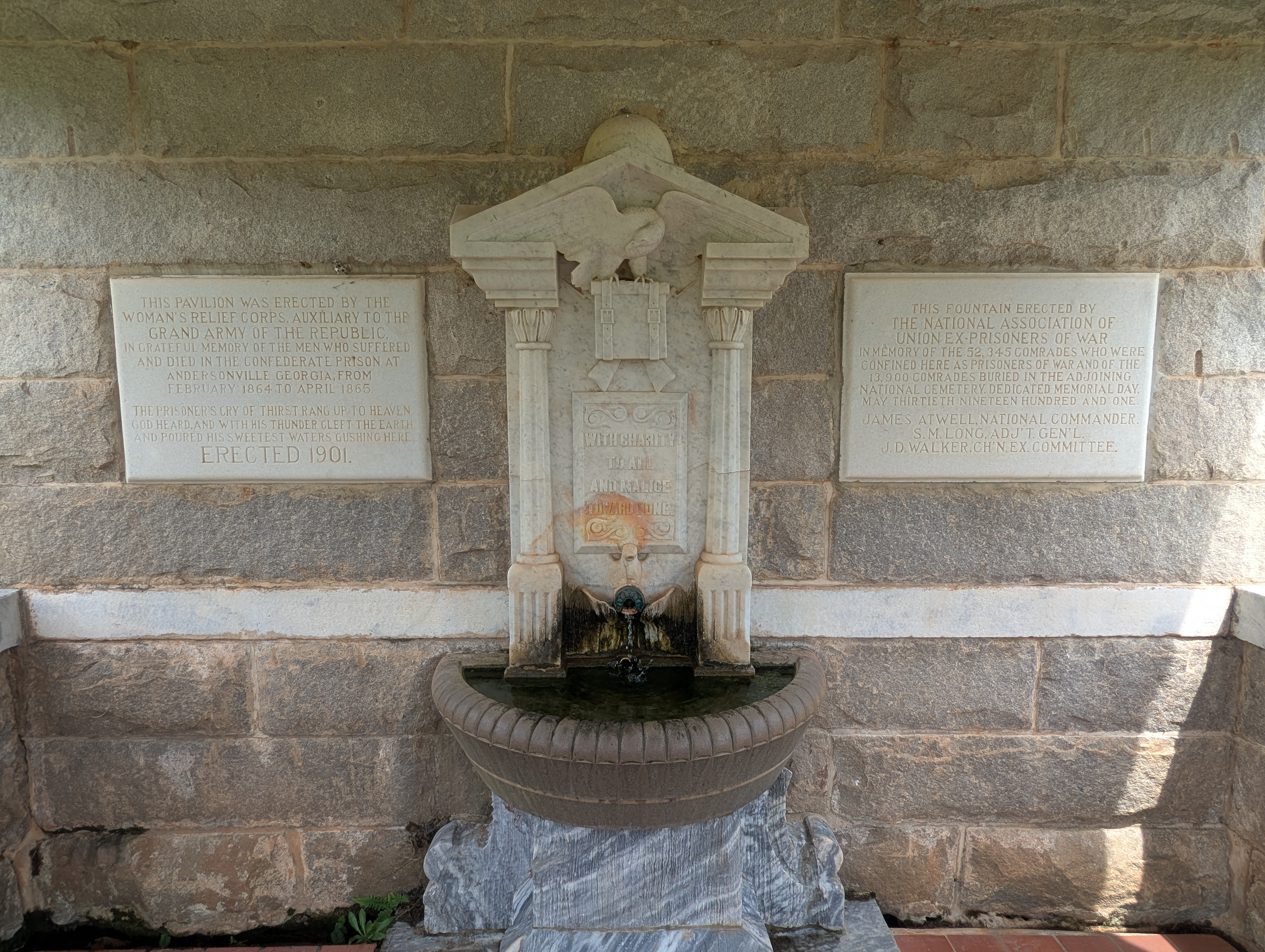
Providence Spring fountain

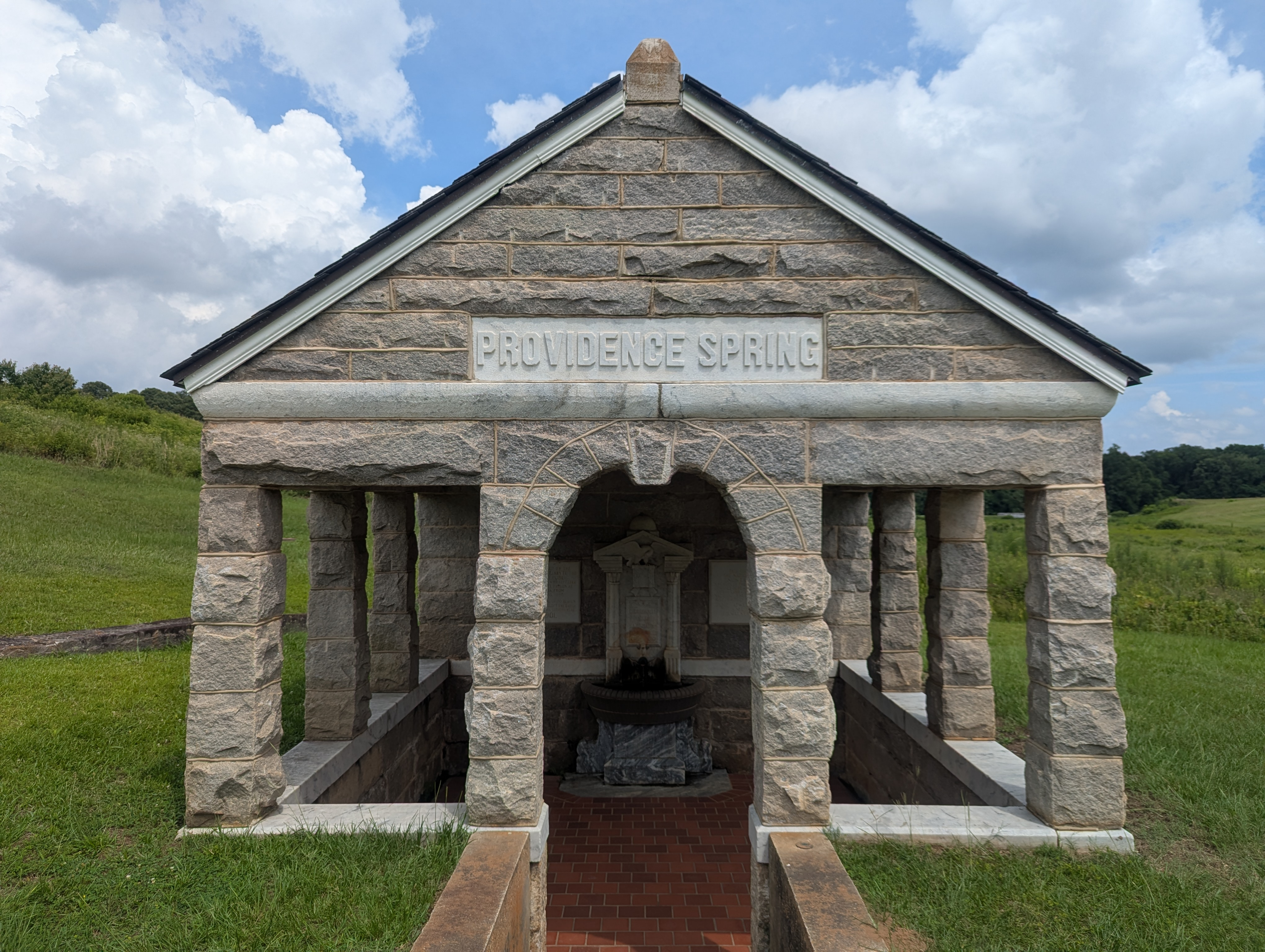
Providence Spring pavilion

Providence Spring is a spring in Sumter County, in the U.S. state of Georgia. It was named for the sudden ("miraculous") emergence at Andersonville Prison on August 10, 1864, making it the only source of clean drinking water for 32,000 Union Army prisoners on 27 acres (11 ha) of ground. A pavilion was constructed over it in 1901 by the Woman's Relief Corps (WRC), while the marble fountain inside, through which the water flows, was erected by the National Association of Union Ex-Prisoners of War.

== History ==
During the civil war, captured Union soldiers had been dying by the hundreds in the Confederate Army's Andersonville Prison for want of fresh water, and had to endure contaminated water from a small shallow creek to sustain them. During a severe electric storm on August 10, 1864, a new stream broke forth, bringing renewed hope to the prisoners. Not only was it providential that this supply of pure water came at this time, but also that it came from within the "dead line" which, by the prison laws, kept it protected from being trampled and defiled, and when led under the dead line in a spout to a large wooden trough, it gave easy access to all. Had it burst out 10 feet (3.0 m) farther north, it would have been outside the prison stockade, where the prisoners could not have gotten at it.

== Dispute ==
In 1883, a prior Andersonville prisoner wrote his account to the Chicago Inter-Ocean, stating that he had been imprisoned from April 4, 1864 to September 10, 1864:

"Earlier rains in June did not wash a gully in the side of the hill. There never was a gully made or washed in the side of the hill. The hill had been dotted with pine and scrub oak, and it had never been cut off, and a side from this, that hill where the spring was located was in a state of nature between the dead line and stockade. The fact is that for some distance up the side of that hill, the ground was damp and marshy-like, there being a heap of water along it for some distance. After it bust out, as it did burst out without human help or aid, the prisoners made a board-trough and run up to the spring's mouth, under the dead-line, and down that through into our buckets, canteens, and tin cups it poured its limpid waters, and thus was the camp furnished with the blessed cooling draught."

Dr. Robert C. Pendergrass of Americus, Georgia stated in 1958 that the spring was not a miracle, as it had existed earlier, having been covered during the construction of the prison's stockade.

== Memorial ==
In 1898, at a meeting of the National Association Union Ex-Prisoners of War, a representative of the WRC notified the National Association that the WRC were the owners of all of the ground within the original Stockade of the Confederate Prison Pen, at Andersonville, and that it was their intention to erect a granite building over Providence Spring and place therein a marble and granite fountain. The WRC requested the cooperation of the National Association who acquiesced and agreed to assume the cost and responsibility of erecting the fountain.

At a ceremony on May 3, 1901, the memorial fountain over the spring was dedicated, the inscription reading: "This fountain was erected by the National Association of Union ex-Prisoners of War in memory of the 52,354 Union prisoners who were confined here as prisoners of war and of the 13,900 comrades who died and whose remains are buried in the adjoining national cemetery."

== See also ==
- Drinking fountains in the United States
