= The Dabney =

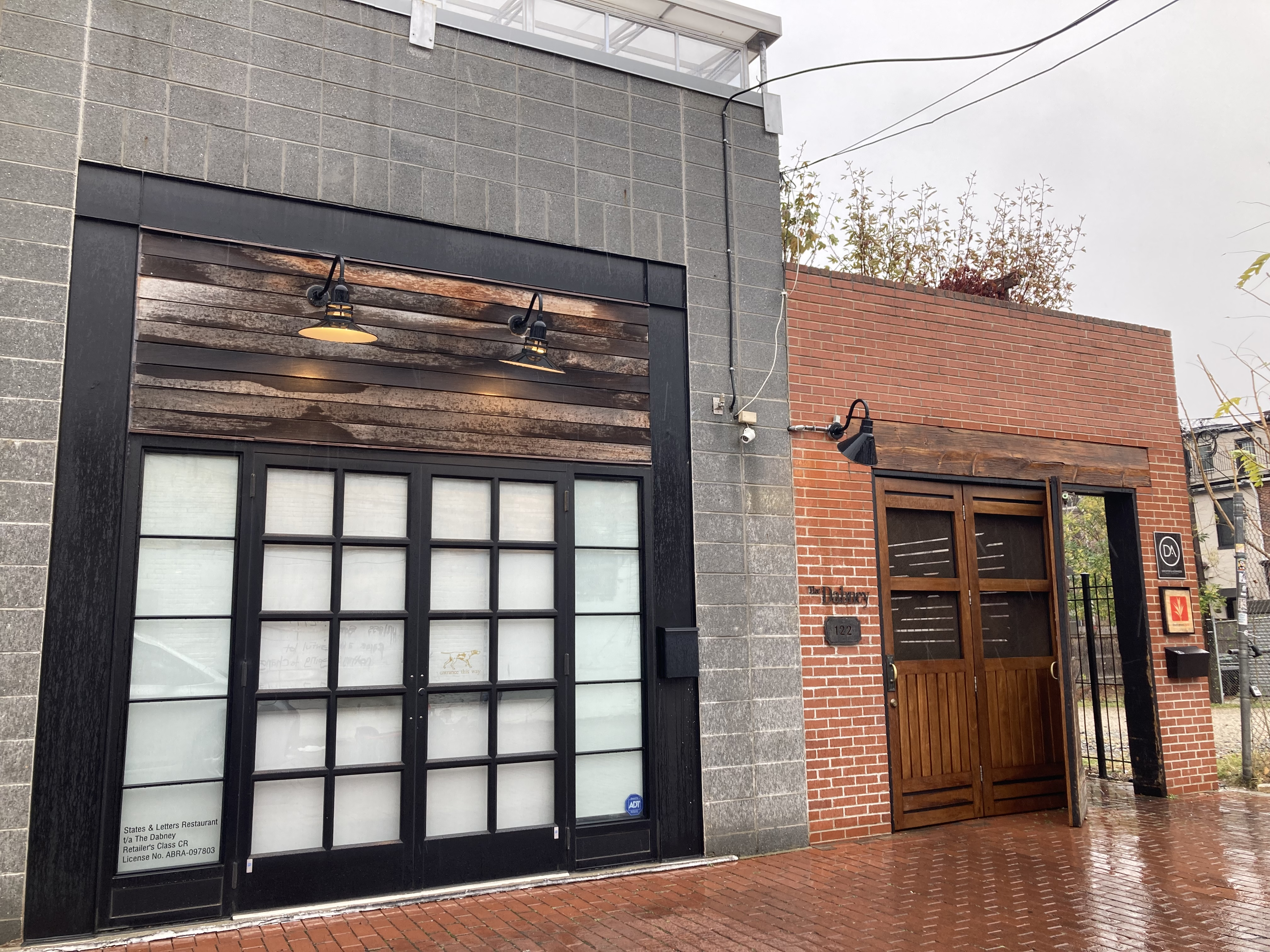
- The Dabney photographed in 2024
- Interactive map of The Dabney

Restaurant information
- Established: October 2015
- Owner: Jeremiah Langhorne
- Chef: Jeremiah Langhorne
- Food type: American
- Dress code: Casual
- Rating: (Michelin Guide)
- Location: 122 Blagden Alley NW, Washington, D.C., 20001, United States
- Coordinates: 38.9063125°N 77.0245625°W
- Seating capacity: 55
- Reservations: Suggested
- Website: https://thedabney.com/

The Dabney is a restaurant located in Blagden Alley, in the Shaw neighborhood of Washington, D.C. Chef-owner Jeremiah Langhorne opened the restaurant in 2015, focusing on Mid-Atlantic cuisine. The Dabney was named one of the Best New Restaurants of 2016 by Bon Appétit magazine, it was a awarded a Michelin Star in 2017, and Chef Langhorne won the James Beard Award for Best Chef, Mid-Atlantic in 2018.

== Restaurant ==
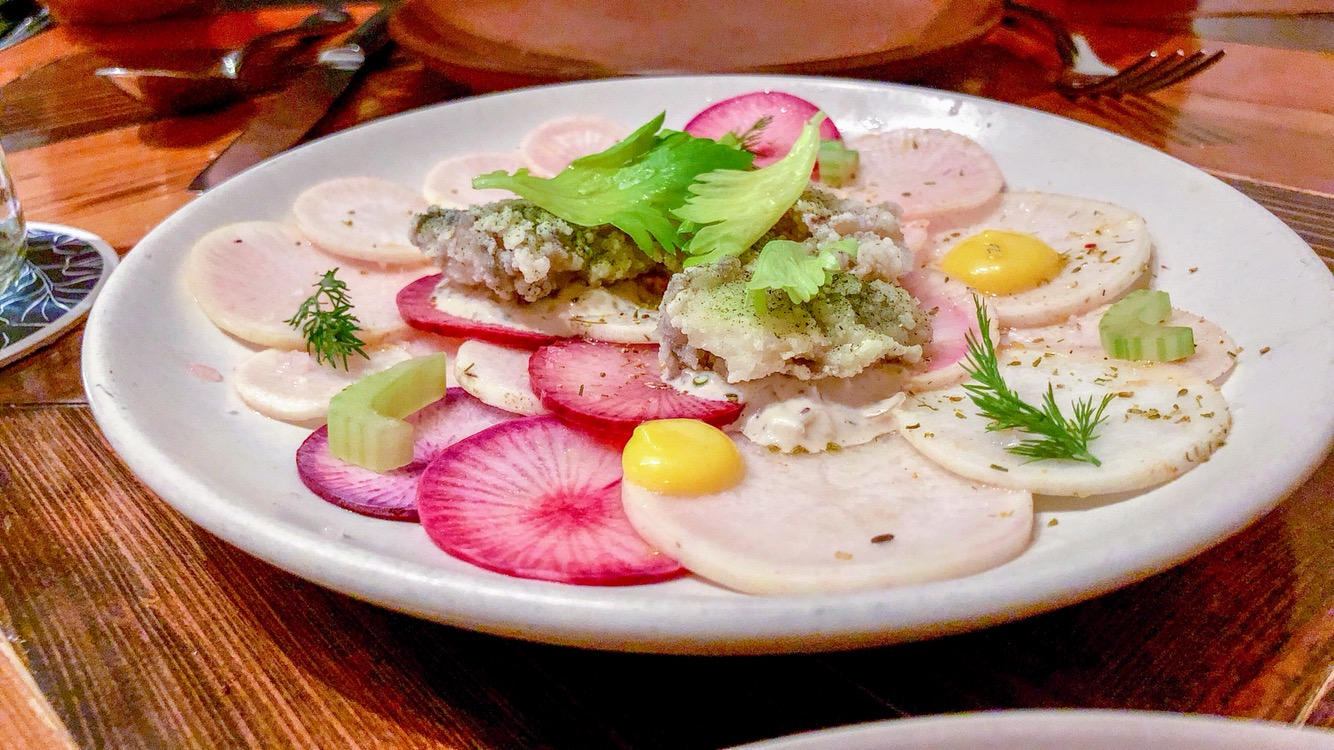
A plated meal at The Dabney

The Dabney is a 55-seat restaurant focused on Mid-Atlantic cuisine. The open kitchen features a ten-foot long wood-burning stone hearth, visible from the dining room. The restaurant was built on the site of an old row house in historic Blagden Alley. In 2017, The Dabney opened a 30-seat bar in the basement.

In the first few months after the restaurant's opening in October 2015, diners were frustrated by menus that changed completely from night to night, but the food became more consistent by the end of winter. Reviewers praised the use of local vegetables and meats, but were less impressed by the desserts.

Bon Appétit placed The Dabney on the list of Best New Restaurants of 2016. It was named one of the South's Best New Restaurants by Southern Living magazine. When the Michelin Guide reviewed restaurants in Washington, DC for the first time for 2017, The Dabney earned a Michelin star.

The Dabney was among the restaurants where Barack and Michelle Obama were seen dining in the year after leaving the White House.

== Jeremiah Langhorne ==
Chef Langhorne was born in Washington, D.C. but raised in Charlottesville, Virginia and the Shenandoah Valley. Langhorne did not attend culinary school, but he was trained by John Haywood, a classically trained chef, at OXO restaurant in Charlottesville.

While cooking at OXO, Langhorne began reading Ping Island Strike, the digital notebook of Sean Brock, the star chef at McCrady's Restaurant in Charleston, South Carolina. After a chance connection in Crested Butte, Colorado, Langhorne got an opportunity to stage at McCrady's in 2008. He soon earned a spot on the line but then left in 2009 to stage at Noma with René Redzepi in Copenhagen. When he returned to McCrady's, he was promoted to sous chef and began a foraging program to collect local ingredients. Langhorne was promoted to chef de cuisine at McCrady's, and in 2012, he was named one of the top five rising chefs in America by Gayot. He was a member of the Eater Young Guns Class of 2012.

In September 2013, Langhorne announced that he was leaving McCrady's to open his own restaurant in Washington, D.C. The Washington Post published a multi-part series leading up to the opening of The Dabney in 2015. In early 2018, Langhorne was the Chef-in-Residence at Chefs Club in New York City. He won the 2018 James Beard Award for Best Chef, Mid-Atlantic.

Langhorne named The Dabney from an old family name, after discovering his Dabney ancestors from Virginia. Langhorne's more recent family owns Langhorne Concrete, who poured the foundation and helped to build the hearth at The Dabney.

== See also ==
- List of Michelin starred restaurants in Washington, D.C.
