= Secretary of state (U.S. state government) =

Official in the state governments of the United States

Party affiliation of current United States secretaries of state or analogous officials: Democratic secretary of state (22 states, 1 district, The District of Columbia) Republican secretary of state (25 states) New Progressive secretary of state (1 territory, Puerto Rico) Position nonexistent (3 states, 4 territories)

The secretary of state is an official in the state governments of 47 of the 50 states of the United States, as well as Puerto Rico and other U.S. possessions. In Massachusetts, Pennsylvania, and Virginia, this official is called the secretary of the commonwealth. In states that have one, the secretary of state is the chief administrative officer of the state and is often the primary custodian of important state records. In the states of Alaska, Hawaii, and Utah, there is no secretary of state; in those states many duties that a secretary of state might normally execute fall within the domain of the lieutenant governor. Like the lieutenant governor, in most states, the secretary of state is in the line of succession to succeed the governor, in most cases immediately behind the lieutenant governor. In three states with no lieutenant governor (Arizona, Oregon and Wyoming) as well as the U.S. territory of Puerto Rico, the secretary of state is first in the line of succession in the event of a gubernatorial vacancy.

Currently, in 35 states, the secretary of state is elected, usually for a four-year term. In others, the secretary of state is appointed by the governor with confirmation with the state's respective Senate; Florida, Oklahoma, Texas, and Virginia are among the states with this practice. In three states, the secretary of state is elected by the state legislature: the General Assembly of Tennessee meets in joint convention to elect the secretary of state to a four-year term, and the Maine Legislature and New Hampshire General Court also select their secretaries of state, but to two-year terms. The longest serving state secretary of state in history was Thad A. Eure of North Carolina, who served from 1936 until 1989.

Secretaries of state, or those acting in that capacity, belong to the National Association of Secretaries of State.

== Duties ==
The actual duties of a secretary of state vary widely from state to state. In most states, the secretary of state's office is a creation of the original draft of the state constitution. However, in many cases responsibilities have been added by statute or executive order.

=== Duties in most states ===
The most common, and arguably the most important, function held by secretaries of state is to serve as the state's chief elections official (although many states also have supervisors of elections, which are usually county elected officials). In 38 states, the ultimate responsibility for the conduct of elections, including the enforcement of qualifying rules, oversight of financial regulation and establishment of Election Day procedures falls on the secretary of state. The exceptions are Alaska, Delaware, Hawaii, Illinois, Maryland, New York, North Carolina, Oklahoma, South Carolina, Utah, Virginia and Wisconsin.

Florida is one of the many states for which this is true, and for this reason, during the 2000 Florida election recount, Florida secretary of state Katherine Harris became one of the few state secretaries of state to become well known nationally.

In the vast majority of states, the secretary of state is also responsible for the administration of the Uniform Commercial Code, an act which provides for the uniform application of business contracts and practices across the United States, including the registration of liens on personal property. Hand in hand with this duty, in most states the secretary of state is responsible for state trademark registration and for chartering businesses (usually including partnerships and corporations) that wish to operate within their state. Accordingly, in most states, the secretary of state also maintains all records on business activities within the state. And in some states, the secretary of state has actual wide-ranging regulatory authority over businesses as well.

In addition to business records, the secretary of state's office is the primary repository of official records in perhaps a majority of states. This includes in most states the official copies of state documents including the actual official copy of the state constitution (and in Delaware, the state-owned copy of the United States Bill of Rights) formal copies of legislative acts enacted into law, executive orders issued by the governor, and regulations and interpretations of statutes issued by state regulatory agencies. In at least a half-dozen states, this record keeping authority extends to civil acts, such as marriages, birth certificates, and adoption and divorce decrees. Many states also require the secretary of state's office to maintain records of land transactions and ownership.

In at least 35 states, the secretary of state is also responsible for the administration of notaries public. And almost all states also designate (almost always in the state constitution itself) that the secretary of state shall be the "keeper of the Great Seal" of the state. Ostensibly this requires the secretary to make decisions as to where the state seal shall be affixed, whether it be onto legislation, state contracts, or other official documents.

Those states which have address confidentiality programs often place the secretary of state in charge of administering them.

=== Less common duties ===
About a dozen states give the secretary of state the task of issuing professional licenses. This includes doctors, plumbers, cosmeticians, general contractors, and, in at least two states, ministers (to perform marriages). In Nevada, Pennsylvania, and West Virginia, the secretary of state must clear anyone who wishes to act as a sports agent for a professional athlete.

In several states (including Indiana, Mississippi, Massachusetts, and Wyoming), the secretary of state is responsible for oversight of the securities industry.

In Illinois, Maine, and Michigan, the secretary of state is in charge of the issuance of driver's licenses, motor vehicle registrations, and collecting motor vehicle taxes. In many other states, these duties fall under an organization such as departments of motor vehicles, transportation, or state police.

In several states the secretary of state is also in charge of monitoring the activities of lobbyists. While some might regard this as a natural extension of the role as chief elections officer, the secretary of the Commonwealth of Virginia, who is not in charge of elections in that state, is nonetheless responsible for regulating lobbying.

In about five states, the secretary of state is the official in charge of the official state museum. In some of these states, and also some states without official museums, the secretary of state is designated as the official with responsibility for maintenance of the state's historical records.

A few states put the secretary of state in charge of the use of public property. In most cases, this means only public buildings (usually the state capitol building), but in Mississippi it also includes some lands that are legally defined as belonging to the state, such as tidelands.

Several states grant a technical statutory authority to the secretary of state in the realm of pardons and commutations. In most cases, this is nothing more than the responsibility to affix the state seal upon the governor's proclamation. However, in Delaware and Nebraska, the secretary of state sits on a board of pardons with the governor, and the secretary of state commands equal authority with the governor in any pardoning decisions that are issued.

Since the early 1980s, many states have increased efforts to develop direct commercial relations with foreign nations. In several of these states, the state's secretary of state has been given primary responsibility in this area. Despite this, there should be no confusion of the duties of a particular state's secretary of state and those of the United States secretary of state. The prohibition of the United States Constitution against individual states having diplomatic relations with foreign states is absolute; these recently evolved duties are of a purely commercial nature.

In Maine and California, in the event of some electoral ties, it is the secretary of state who determines the winner by drawing lots. In California, this does not extend to primary elections, or to the elections of the governor or the lieutenant governor. In Maine, this duty only applies to primary elections.

=== Unique responsibilities ===
Several states have given their secretary of state at least one responsibility that is shared by no other state's secretary:

- In California, consenting adults can enter into a domestic partnership by registering with the secretary of state.
- In Connecticut, becoming a moderator for political debates requires a license from the secretary of state.
- In Colorado, performing arts societies are required to file certain information with the secretary of state.
- In Delaware, the secretary of state oversees the Delaware Office of Veterans Services.
- In Illinois, the secretary of state is ex officio Clerk of the Court of Claims. In addition, the secretary of state is responsible for the enforcement of state motor vehicle theft statutes and the regulation of the automotive industry.
- In Indiana, the secretary of state is responsible for the regulation of auto dealerships.
- In Iowa, the secretary of state awards the Carrie Chapman Catt Award to every school in Iowa that signs up and registers at least 90 percent of their eligible students to vote. The award is named after the Iowan who was a national leader in the women’s suffrage movement.
- In Kentucky, the secretary of state oversees the State Land Office, which maintains a permanent record of the state’s land grants, warrants, and surveys.
- In Louisiana, notices of retirement by state officials and employees are filed with the secretary of state.
- In Maryland, developers of residential condominiums and timeshares must register with the secretary of state.
- In Massachusetts, the secretary of the Commonwealth functions as register of deeds for the entire state, maintaining branch offices in each county.
- In Michigan, auto insurers writing policies for Michigan residents are required to file policyholder information with the secretary of state.
- In Minnesota, members of state boards, commissions, and councils are appointed through a merit-based open appointments process administered by the secretary of state. State law also requires the secretary of state to publish an annual report that provides a listing and description of the duties, membership, and statistics for each state board, commission, or council.
- In Mississippi, the secretary of state has a fiduciary responsibility for enforcement of sixteenth section public school trust lands and lieu lands laws, care and management of the state's public trust tidelands, and the disposition of lands forfeited to the state for non-payment of ad valorem taxes, among other duties.
- In Montana, the secretary of state sits on the Board of Examiners, which serves as the issuer of state debt and approves the sale of bonds for the state.
- In Nebraska, debt management agencies cannot carry on business without first obtaining a license from the secretary of state.
- In Nevada, the secretary of state is a member of the governing board for the Tahoe Regional Planning Agency, which protects the environment within Lake Tahoe Basin through land-use regulations.
- In New Hampshire, vital records administration is the responsibility of the secretary of state.
- In New Jersey, the secretary of state is in charge of enhancing and building awareness of ethnic diversity. Other duties include promoting volunteerism and literacy.
- In New York, the secretary of state is charged with oversight of the state's thousands of cemeteries. In addition, the secretary of state administers the state's Coastal Management Program under the terms of the federal Coastal Zone Management Act.
- In North Carolina, the secretary of state protects investors by prosecuting violations of the state's securities laws.
- In North Dakota, the secretary of state is a member of, and ex officio secretary to, the Emergency Commission.
- In Ohio, the secretary of state is a member of the Apportionment Board, which meets every decade following the decennial census to redraw boundaries for each of the 99 Ohio House and 33 Ohio Senate districts. Other members of the Apportionment Board are the governor, the auditor of state and two members, one Republican and one Democrat, appointed by state legislative leaders.
- In Oregon, the secretary of state is auditor of public accounts by virtue of the state constitution and in this capacity performs financial, compliance, and performance audits of state agencies and local governments.
- In Pennsylvania, the secretary of the commonwealth oversees the State Athletic Commission, which regulates professional boxing and mixed martial arts.
- In Puerto Rico, the secretary of state issues bingo licenses.
- In Rhode Island, state agencies and local governments are required to file notices of public meetings with the secretary of state under the auspices of the state's Open Meetings Act. The secretary of state in turn publishes said notices online.
- In South Carolina, the secretary of state is responsible for registering cable television franchises.
- In South Dakota, the secretary of state is the authority for issuance of concealed weapon permits.
- In Tennessee, the secretary of state regulates disaster relief fundraising.
- In Texas, the secretary of state registers health spas.
- In Utah, local governments and limited purpose entities are required to register with the lieutenant governor, who performs the role of secretary of state.
- In Virginia, the secretary of the commonwealth manages clemency petitions, restoration of civil rights, and extraditions while also acting as the governor's liaison with Virginia's Native American tribes.
- In Washington, the secretary of state is ex officio chairperson of the state's Productivity Board. By law, the Productivity Board is charged with reviewing civil servant suggestions to improve the delivery of public services and increase efficiency of government operations.
- In West Virginia, land banks cannot operate unless they have registered with the secretary of state.
- In Wisconsin, the secretary of state is, per the state constitution, an ex officio member of the Wisconsin Board of Commissioners of Public Lands together with the state treasurer and the attorney general. The Board of Commissioners of Public Lands invests Wisconsin's four school trust funds and sustainably manages the remaining school trust lands for the benefit of public education, pre-kindergarten through university. A major source of revenue for the school trust funds - the largest being the Common School Fund, with a fair market value of over $1 billion - is BCPL's State Trust Fund Loan Program, which lends trust fund principal to school districts and municipalities for financing public purpose projects that contribute towards economic development, local infrastructure, capital equipment and vehicles, building repairs and improvements, or refinancing existing liabilities to reduce future borrowing costs.
- In Wyoming, the secretary of state is responsible for receiving and filing ethics disclosures from all state lawmakers and each of the state's constitutional officers. Wyoming is the only state in the union that lacks an ethics commission.

== Current secretaries of state ==
Name	State	Party	Start	Title	Type
Wes Allen	Alabama	Republican	January 16, 2023	Secretary of State	Elected
Nancy Dahlstrom	Alaska	Republican	December 5, 2022	Lieutenant Governor	Ticket
Pulu Ae Ae	American Samoa	Republican	January 3, 2025	Lieutenant Governor	Ticket
Adrian Fontes	Arizona	Democratic	January 2, 2023	Secretary of State	Elected
Cole Jester	Arkansas	Republican	January 1, 2025	Secretary of State	Elected
Shirley Weber	California	Democratic	February 2, 2021	Secretary of State	Elected
Jena Griswold	Colorado	Democratic	January 8, 2019	Secretary of State	Elected
Stephanie Thomas	Connecticut	Democratic	January 4, 2023	Secretary of the State	Elected
Charuni Patibanda-Sanchez	Delaware	Democratic	January 28, 2025	Secretary of State	Appointed
Kimberly Bassett	District of Columbia	Democratic	December 11, 2018	Secretary of the District	Appointed
Cord Byrd	Florida	Republican	May 16, 2022	Secretary of State	Appointed
Brad Raffensperger	Georgia	Republican	January 14, 2019	Secretary of State	Elected
Josh Tenorio	Guam	Democratic	January 7, 2019	Lieutenant Governor	Ticket
Sylvia Luke; On leave	Hawaii	Democratic	December 5, 2022	Lieutenant Governor	Ticket with separate primary
Keith Regan; Acting	Hawaii	Democratic	April 23, 2026	Lieutenant Governor	Ticket with separate primary
Phil McGrane	Idaho	Republican	January 2, 2023	Secretary of State	Elected
Alexi Giannoulias	Illinois	Democratic	January 9, 2023	Secretary of State	Elected
Diego Morales	Indiana	Republican	January 1, 2023	Secretary of State	Elected
Paul Pate	Iowa	Republican	January 1, 2015	Secretary of State	Elected
Scott Schwab	Kansas	Republican	January 14, 2019	Secretary of State	Elected
Michael Adams	Kentucky	Republican	January 6, 2020	Secretary of State	Elected
Nancy Landry	Louisiana	Republican	January 8, 2024	Secretary of State	Elected
Shenna Bellows	Maine	Democratic	January 4, 2021	Secretary of State	Legislature
Michael Lore; Acting	Maryland	Democratic	November 6, 2026	Secretary of State	Appointed
Bill Galvin	Massachusetts	Democratic	January 1, 1995	Secretary of the Commonwealth	Elected
Jocelyn Benson	Michigan	Democratic	January 1, 2019	Secretary of State	Elected
Steve Simon	Minnesota	Democratic (DFL)	January 5, 2015	Secretary of State	Elected
Michael Watson	Mississippi	Republican	January 14, 2020	Secretary of State	Elected
Denny Hoskins	Missouri	Republican	January 13, 2025	Secretary of State	Elected
Christi Jacobsen	Montana	Republican	January 4, 2021	Secretary of State	Elected
Bob Evnen	Nebraska	Republican	January 10, 2019	Secretary of State	Elected
Cisco Aguilar	Nevada	Democratic	January 2, 2023	Secretary of State	Elected
David Scanlan	New Hampshire	Republican	January 10, 2022	Secretary of State	Legislature
Shirley Emehelu	New Jersey	Democratic	September 25, 2026	Secretary of State	Appointed
Maggie Toulouse Oliver	New Mexico	Democratic	December 9, 2016	Secretary of State	Elected
Walter Mosley	New York	Democratic	May 22, 2024	Secretary of State	Appointed
Elaine Marshall	North Carolina	Democratic	January 3, 1997	Secretary of State	Elected
Michael Howe	North Dakota	Republican	January 1, 2023	Secretary of State	Elected
Dennis Mendiola	Northern Mariana Islands	Republican	July 23, 2025	Lieutenant Governor	Ticket
Frank LaRose	Ohio	Republican	January 14, 2019	Secretary of State	Elected
Benjamin Lepak	Oklahoma	Republican	October 2, 2025	Secretary of State	Appointed
Tobias Read	Oregon	Democratic	January 6, 2025	Secretary of State	Elected
Al Schmidt	Pennsylvania	Republican	January 17, 2023	Secretary of the Commonwealth	Appointed
Rosachely Rivera	Puerto Rico	New Progressive/ Democratic	July 3, 2025	Secretary of State	Appointed
Gregg Amore	Rhode Island	Democratic	January 3, 2023	Secretary of State	Elected
Mark Hammond	South Carolina	Republican	January 15, 2003	Secretary of State	Elected
Monae Johnson	South Dakota	Republican	December 5, 2022	Secretary of State	Elected
Tre Hargett	Tennessee	Republican	January 15, 2009	Secretary of State	Legislature
Robert Howden; Acting	Texas	Republican	July 17, 2026	Secretary of State	Appointed
Deidre Henderson	Utah	Republican	January 4, 2021	Lieutenant Governor	Ticket
Sarah Copeland-Hanzas	Vermont	Democratic	January 5, 2023	Secretary of State	Elected
Tregenza Roach	U.S. Virgin Islands	Democratic	January 7, 2019	Lieutenant Governor	Ticket
Candi King	Virginia	Democratic	January 17, 2026	Secretary of the Commonwealth	Appointed
Steve Hobbs	Washington	Democratic	November 22, 2021	Secretary of State	Elected
Kris Warner	West Virginia	Republican	January 13, 2025	Secretary of State	Elected
Sarah Godlewski	Wisconsin	Democratic	March 17, 2023	Secretary of State	Elected
Chuck Gray	Wyoming	Republican	January 2, 2023	Secretary of State	Elected

== See also ==
- List of company registers
- List of female secretaries of state (in states without lieutenant governors)
- List of U.S. statewide elected officials
- National Association of Secretaries of State
- Returning officer
- State attorney general
- State constitutional officer
- State treasurer
- United States Secretary of State
