= Secretary of the District of Columbia =

Officer of the Government of the District of Columbia

Secretary of State of the District of Columbia
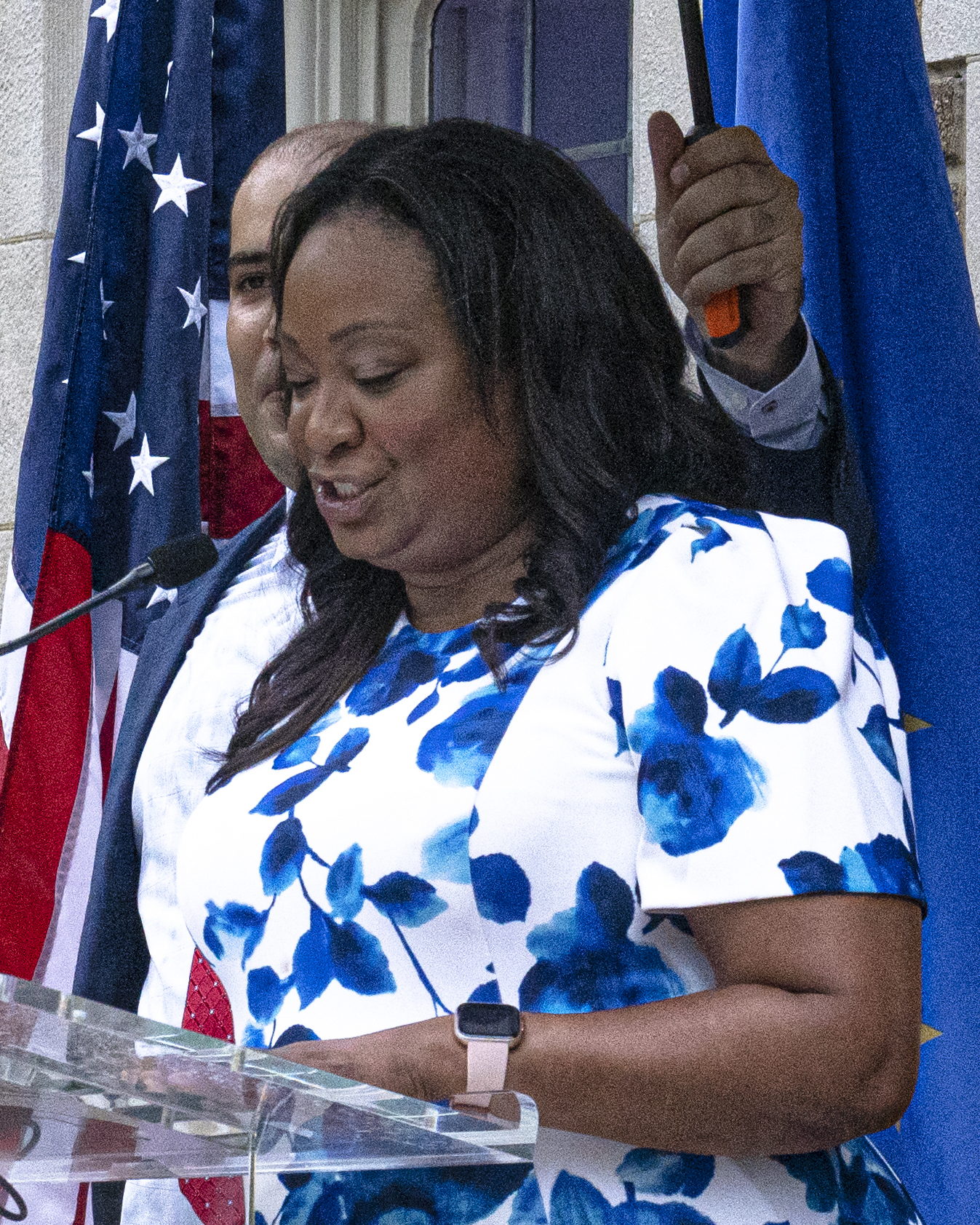
- Incumbent; Kimberly A. Bassett since 2018
- Type: Secretary
- Formation: 1871
- First holder: Norton P. Chipman
- Website: Official homepage of the District of Columbia Secretary of State

The Secretary of the District of Columbia is one of the officers of the Government of the District of Columbia. The position of Secretary of the District is equivalent to the office of Secretary of State in other U.S. states.

The current Secretary of State of the District of Columbia is Kimberly A. Bassett.

The Secretary of State of the District of Columbia's Office is composed of six divisions:

- The Ceremonial Services Unit processes requests for various ceremonial items such as proclamations.
- The Office of Documents and Administrative Issuances prepares and publishes the official government documents of the District, including the District of Columbia Register and the District of Columbia Municipal Regulations
- The Office of Notary Commissions and Authentications commissions District of Columbia notaries public and authenticates documents for domestic and foreign use.
- The Office of Protocol and International Affairs is the District government’s primary liaison with the diplomatic and international community for both substantive and ceremonial matters.
- The Office of Public Records and Archives is the records management office of the District and is responsible for the archiving of government documents.
- The Office of the Secretary, which is the main office of the Secretary of the District. The Office of the Secretary is the custodian of the Seal of the District of Columbia.

== List of secretaries of the District of Columbia ==
Name	Term
Norton P. Chipman	1871
Edwin L. Stanton	1871–1873
Richard Harrington	1873–1874
William Tindall	1874–1915
Daniel J. Donovan	1915–1918
C. Willard Camalier	1918–1919
Daniel E. Garges	1919–1934
Ronald M. Brennan	1934–1937
G.M. Thornett	1937–1964
F.E. Ropshaw	1964–1969
Martin Schaller	1969–1978
Dwight S. Cropp	1979–1984
Clifton B. Smith	1984–1987
David Rivers	1987
Teri Y. Doke	1989–1990
Mildred W. Goodman	1991–1993
Stephanie Greene	1993–1994
Marianne Coleman Niles	1995–1996
Kathleen E. Arnold	1996–1998
Beverly D. Rivers	1999–2003
Sherryl Hobbs Newman	2003–2005
Patricia Elwood	2005–2007
Stephanie Scott	2007–2010
Naomi Shelton	2010–2011
Cynthia Brock-Smith	2011–2014
Sharon Anderson	2014–2015 (interim)
Lauren Vaughan	2015–2018
Kimberly Bassett	2018–present
