= Fight Club DC =

- Address: Washington, D.C. United States
- Type: Skatepark

Construction
- Opened: 2004
- Closed: 2010

Fight Club DC was a private recreational and creative space for skateboarding, arts, music, documentation and construction, in Washington, D.C. It was located on Blagden Alley in D.C.'s Shaw neighborhood, near the Walter E. Washington Convention Center, from 2004 to 2010. Fight Club DC was managed by Jen & Dan Zeman, Stephanie Murdock, and Ben Ashworth. It has been reported that Fight Club DC shut down due to "political differences" among the partners.

After fight club shut down, the warehouse became a pop-up art gallery "Contemporary Wing" but it was soon redeveloped and is now a five-story, 70-unit apartment called The Colonel.

== Skating ==
Primary skating features included:

- An indoor bowl, comprising wooden ramps, metal joiners, spines, walls (evolving features)
- Two outdoor halfpipe ramps about 4–5 ft.
- Music (iPod DJ or live bands during events)

A donation was requested for all skaters. Under 18 were allowed to skate with prior permission from a manager. Weekly skating sessions were usually BYOB. Participants included people on BMX, power stilts, and inline skates.

== History ==
Fight Club DC was established following the demise in 2004 of Vans Skate Park, a "massive corporate-sponsored outdoor bowl in Woodbridge that had won over the generally anti-establishment skating community," according to the Washington City Paper. Ashworth and Anthony Smallwood acquired the ramps (and the Vans column padding) and decided to set up an "underground" indoor space for skateboarding, music, art, and parties.

After two years of increasing popularity and a wildly destructive party, a media campaign was organized to proclaim the "death" of fight club. Meanwhile operations continued, with emphasis on more low-key celebrations before closing for good in 2010.

Fight Club hosted many bands paired with art exhibitions. Some of the largest events were curated by Smallwood as a part of DC Photo Week's Fixation. Fight Club also hosted the 2008 Skaters for Public Parks Summit

The Points, a band from the D.C. punk rock community, were referred to as "the house band of Fight Club" and were estimated to have performed there nearly forty times. The group's drummer, Travis Jackson, recalled that "we’d arrange for all the bands that played the parties. And these bands would come and see skaters going while the music’s going, and everybody just bonding together. Pretty much 100 percent of the bands we brought in told us they’d never seen anything like it."

Calico, a restaurant located in Blagden Alley, debuted the "Fight Club" burger in 2017, as an homage to Fight Club DC, which had once been located nearby.
