= Lauren Vaughan =

American civil servant

Secretary of the District of Columbia
- In office January 2, 2015 – December 11, 2018
- Mayor: Muriel Bowser
- Preceded by: Sharon Anderson (acting)
- Succeeded by: Kimberly A. Bassett

Personal details
- Party: Democratic
- Education: Hampton University (BA); George Washington University (MS)

Lauren C. Vaughan is an American civil servant from Washington, D.C. who served as Secretary of the District of Columbia from 2015 to 2018.

== Education ==
Vaughan earned a Bachelor of Arts degree in Mass Media Arts from Hampton University and a Master of Science in Engineering and Technology Management from George Washington University.

== Career ==
She has since worked in various organizations as trainer, manager and chief executive. From 2001 she was Co-Chair and Board Chair of My Sister's Place, a domestic violence shelter. From 2009 to 2015, she was Chief Executive of My Sister's Place.

Vaughan became Secretary of the District of Columbia on January 2, 2015 as a member of the Democratic Party. She served until December 11, 2018.

Political offices
Preceded by Sharon Anderson; Acting	Secretary of the District of Columbia; 2015–2018	Succeeded by Kimberly A. Bassett
