= District of Columbia Archives =

Official records repository of the District of Columbia, U.S.

District of Columbia Office of Public Records Management, Archival Administration, and Library of Governmental Information

Agency overview
- Formed: September 5, 1985
- Type: Public Records Repository
- Headquarters: District Records Center, 1300 Naylor Ct NW, Washington, DC 20001; 38.907869°N 77.024629°W
- Agency executive: [vacant], Public Records Administrator
- Parent agency: Secretary of the District of Columbia
- Website: https://os.dc.gov/page/office-public-records-and-archives

The District of Columbia Archives, formally, the Office of Public Records Management, Archival Administration, and Library of Governmental Information, is the state-level archives of the District of Columbia. Its principal archival holdings reside in a converted stable in the Blagden Alley-Naylor Court Historic District and its much larger collection of retained records sit in leased space at the Washington National Records Center and in various D.C. government office buildings.

In its facilities, the D.C. Archives holds vital records on millions of individuals, many notable. The archives hold the original wills of Dolley Madison, Francis Scott Key, Frederick Douglass, Henry Adams, Woodrow Wilson, Alexander Graham Bell and Louis D. Brandeis. It similarly preserves Mildred and Richard Loving's marriage certificate, Duke Ellington's birth certificate, and the Architectural registration for Chloethiel Woodard Smith.

The state of the current records facility and operations has been described as "decrepit" and "overcrowded."

== History ==
The District of Columbia Archives were established during the second mayoral term of Marion Barry in 1985. Prior to this time, government records pertaining to the District of Columbia were held by the federal National Archives and Records Administration. Barry and his political allies saw the control of DC's history as part of the broader struggle for home rule and the remembrance of Black History. Efforts to separate the District's archives date to at least 1982 and were formalized with the D.C. Public Records Management Act of 1985. Philip W. Oglvie was made the original director of the office, and a National Archives employee named Dorothy S. Provine joined as D.C.'s first archivist.

After a lengthy search through government-owned properties that could be economically adapted into an archive—the weight of densely packed archival documents requires strong structural support—Oglvie located the former B.F. McCaully & Co. Tally-Ho Stables in an alley named Naylor Court, off of 9th Street NW in Shaw). Construction work to accommodate the project began in 1988 and was completed in 1990, leading to disruption among residents, artists, and informal businesses that occupied the alley up to that point.

Within a few years, the District of Columbia's financial crisis forced severe reductions in funding and staffing at the archives. After Oglvie retired in 1997, the DC Archives had only two employees.

In 2018, the Secretary of the District of Columbia announced that a new archive facility would be built on the campus of the University of the District of Columbia.
