= Seal of Washington, D.C. =

Seal of the District of Columbia

Versions
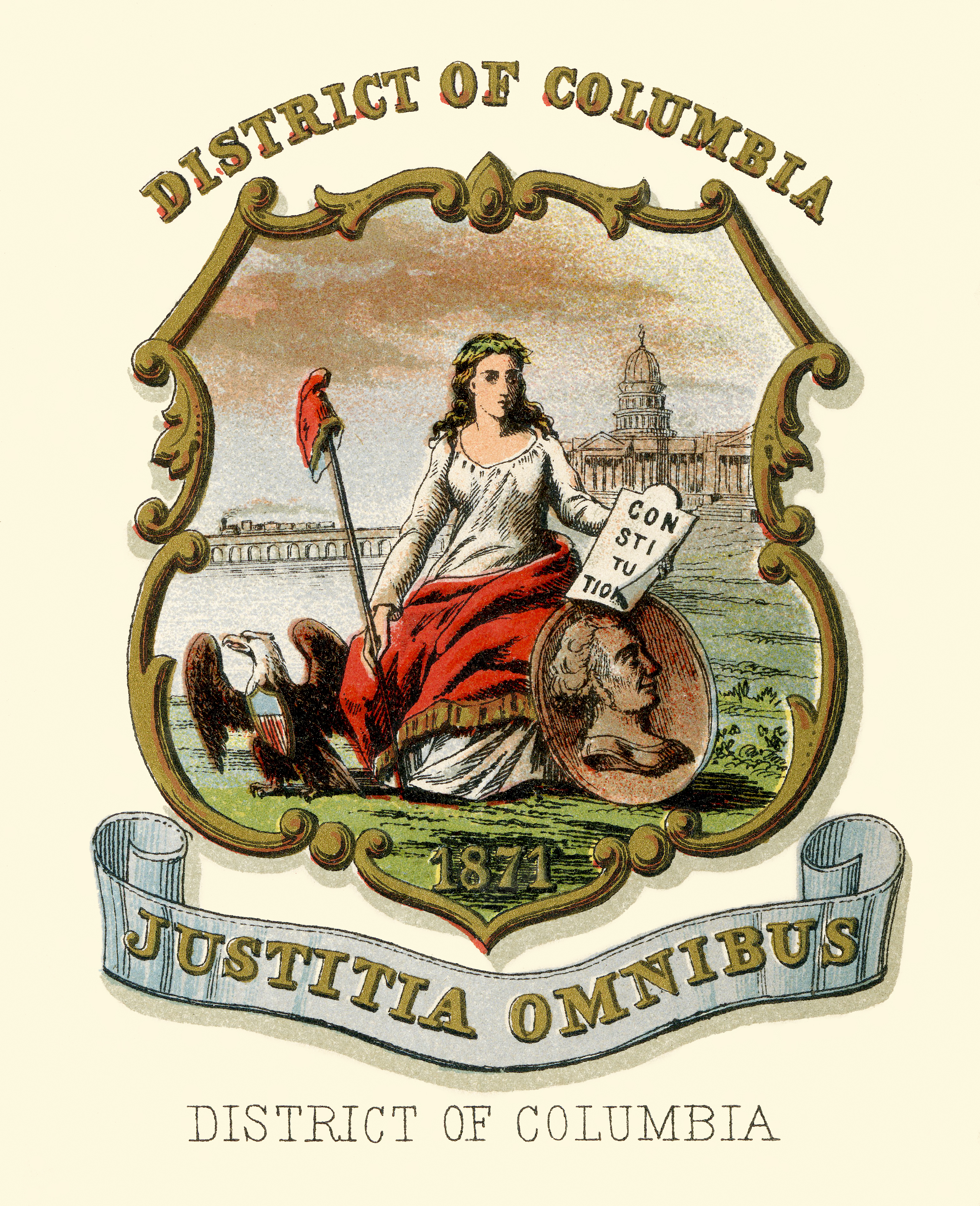
- Historical coat of arms (1876)
- Armiger: District of Columbia
- Adopted: 1871
- Motto: Justitia Omnibus

The great seal of the District of Columbia is the official seal representing the district. It features George Washington standing on a pedestal, with a blindfolded woman holding a wreath next to him. In the background is the Potomac River and the United States Capitol.

The seal was designed by a commission authorized by Congress in 1871 after the creation of the territorial government for the District of Columbia. The exact individual designer of the seal is not clearly recorded, but the design was adopted by the Board of Commissioners overseeing the district at that time.

== Design ==
The seal presents George Washington on a pedestal, his right hand holding a sword, and his left rests upon fasces — an axe within rods — representing the United States' Union. Standing on the right is a blindfolded woman, in her hand the constitution, representing justice. On her right is an American bald eagle with agricultural products behind it. In the background is the Potomac River and the United States Capitol on the right, and a train and a sun on the left. Beneath it all, is written 1871 within a wreath. Under the wreath is written Justitia Omnibus on a scroll, which means Justice For All in Latin.

== History ==
On August 31, 1871, the Council of the District of Columbia passed an act prescribing a design for a seal. This act was passed following a law creating a government for the district, which was adopted on February 21, 1871. When adopted, the seal lacked a description, however, and its designer was not clearly recorded. Initially, the seal depicted Lady Justice placing a wreath on the Statue of Freedom, which sat atop the Capitol dome. The office of the Secretary of the District of Columbia was in custody of the seal until a new act was passed on June 20, 1874, which put the insignia under the control of the Secretary to the Board of Commissioners.

In 1903, a new seal was adopted, similar to the 1871 seal. On the scroll of the seal was written Justitia Omnibus, the date on the wreath was 1871, and the word on the book the lady was holding read Constitution in three lines. The seal was used on numerous publications until May 15, 1979, when a mayor's memorandum discussing printing standards declared that it should be replaced by a logo representing the District of Columbia flag. This logo, called the "Stars and Bars," features three stars over two bars, as depicted on the flag. In 1986, the control of the seal reverted to the office of the Secretary of the District of Columbia.

== Usage ==
The use of the Great Seal of the District of Columbia is prohibited except if permission is obtained by the Secretary of the District of Columbia, the current holder of the insignia. The display or use of the seal is reserved for official purposes. All requests for permission to use or reproduce the Seal of the District of Columbia must be submitted in writing to the Secretary before its use by an agency head for any purpose. Determinations about the use of the seal are solely within the discretion of the Secretary of the District of Columbia. The Mayor issues rules regarding the size and form of the seal.

== Coat of arms ==
Coat of arms of Washington, D.C.
- Armiger: District of Columbia
- Crest: From a crest coronet a raven rising wings elevated and addorsed proper.
- Torse: Argent two bars Gules, in chief three mullets of the second.
- Motto: Exitus acta probat (The outcome is the test of the act)

Coat of arms of Washington, D.C. is the Washington family coat of arms.

== History ==
The coat of arms design with two horizontal bars below three mullets, though with the tinctures reversed from the later arms, is recorded for Sir William de Hertburn/de Wessyngton's great-grandson. At the end of the 14th century, the current design is recorded. The family scattered in various parts of the country over the next century. One branch of the family, which later moved to the Colony of Virginia, settled in Northamptonshire, England. In 1592, Robert Cook, Clarenceux King of Arms confirms upon Lawrence Washington of Sulgrave Manor the current coat of arms.

In a letter dated 7 December 1791, George Washington received the confirmation from Sir Isaac Heard, Garter Principal King of Arms of the College of Arms in London. He responds that "the arms are the same that are held here by certain ancestral family member." The President used the coat of arms in many places around his home at Mount Vernon including on several personal items as well as on the livery uniforms of his servants, as this was a common practice prior to the American Revolution among wealthy plantation owners.

It was the first coat of arms recorded in the Committee on Heraldry of the New England Historic Genealogical Society's Roll of Arms.

== Usage ==
The use of the Coat of arms of the District of Columbia is unrestricted by the Secretary of the District of Columbia, the current holder of the insignia. The display or use of the seal is reserved for official purposes and was also used as the Washington family coat of arms.
