= Blagden Alley-Naylor Court Historic District =

Historic district in Washington, D.C., United States

- Blagden Alley–Naylor Court Historic District
- U.S. National Register of Historic Places
- U.S. Historic district
- D.C. Inventory of Historic Sites
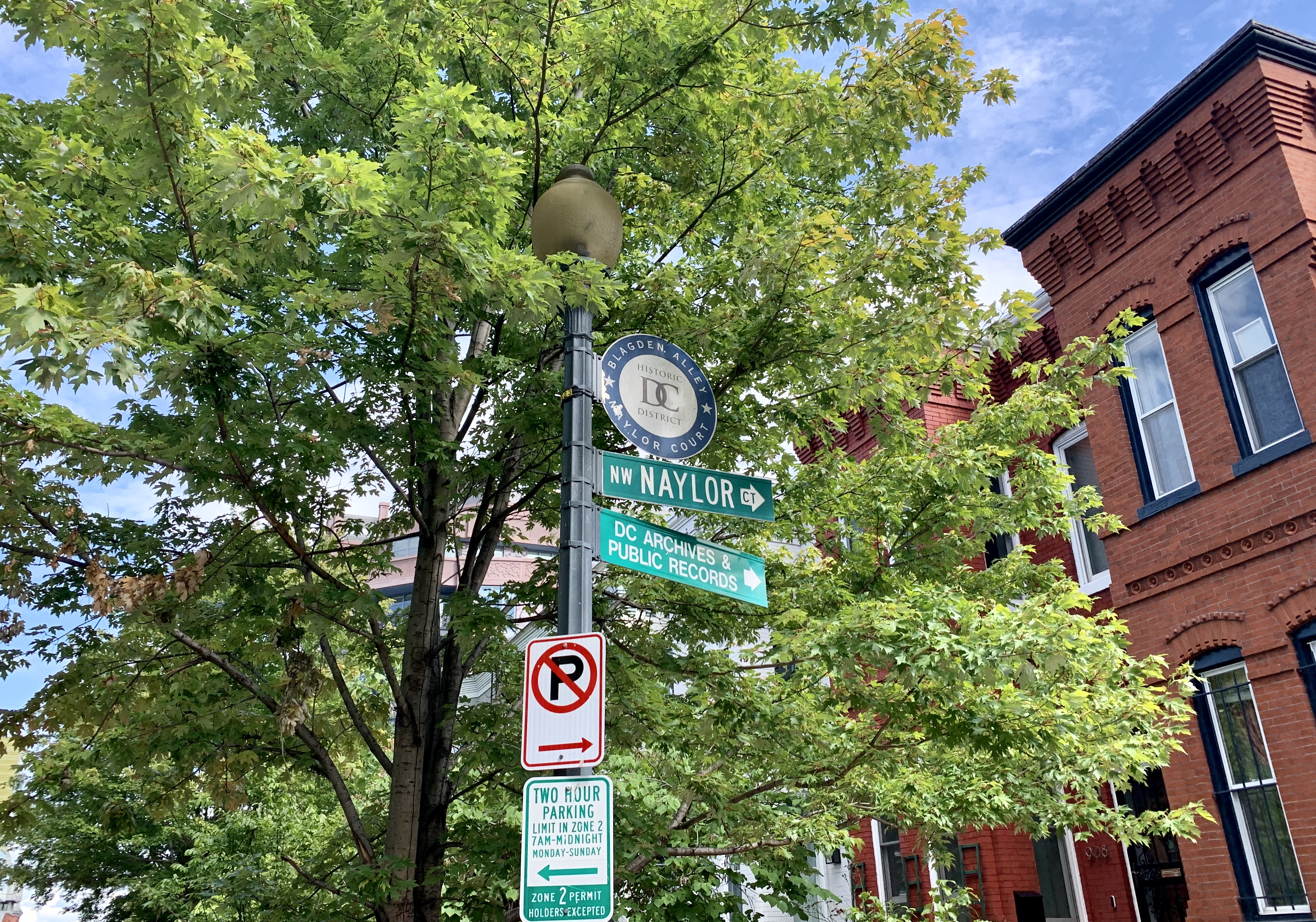
- Naylor Court street sign

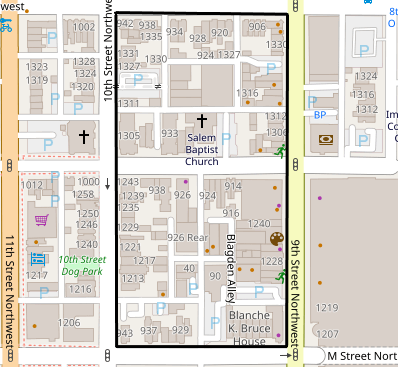
- Location: bounded by 9th, 10th, M and O Sts., NW, Washington, District of Columbia
- Coordinates: 38.912222°N 77.025833°W ,
- Architectural style: Mid-19th-century revival; late Victorian
- NRHP reference No.: 90001734

Significant dates
- Added to NRHP: November 16, 1990
- Designated DCIHS: November 13, 1990

The Blagden Alley-Naylor Court Historic District is a neighborhood in the Shaw district of Washington, D.C., characterized by two alleyways, Blagden Alley and Naylor Court, bounded by 9th, 10th, M and O Sts., NW.

== History ==
The names Blagden Alley and Naylor Court were derived from two 19th-century property owners, Thomas Blagden and Dickerson Nailor.

After the Civil War, residential development in Washington, DC, expanded north from downtown to the Blagden Alley-Naylor Court area and attracted several prestigious, affluent residents, including Blanche Bruce, the first African-American to serve a full term in the U.S. Senate, whose historic house is adjacent to the south entrance to Blagden Alley. Many African-Americans migrated to Washington during this time and came to live in the alley itself in simple dwellings, including lean-tos, and shanties.

Local residents saw the alley dwellings as a nuisance, and Congress passed a law banning their construction in 1892. In the early 1930s, reformers led by Eleanor Roosevelt sought to eradicate deplorable living conditions in alleys citywide and used Blagden Alley as their model.

Much of the neighborhood suffered damage in the 1968 Washington, D.C. riots, and the alley dwellings were largely abandoned.

== Designation as historic district ==
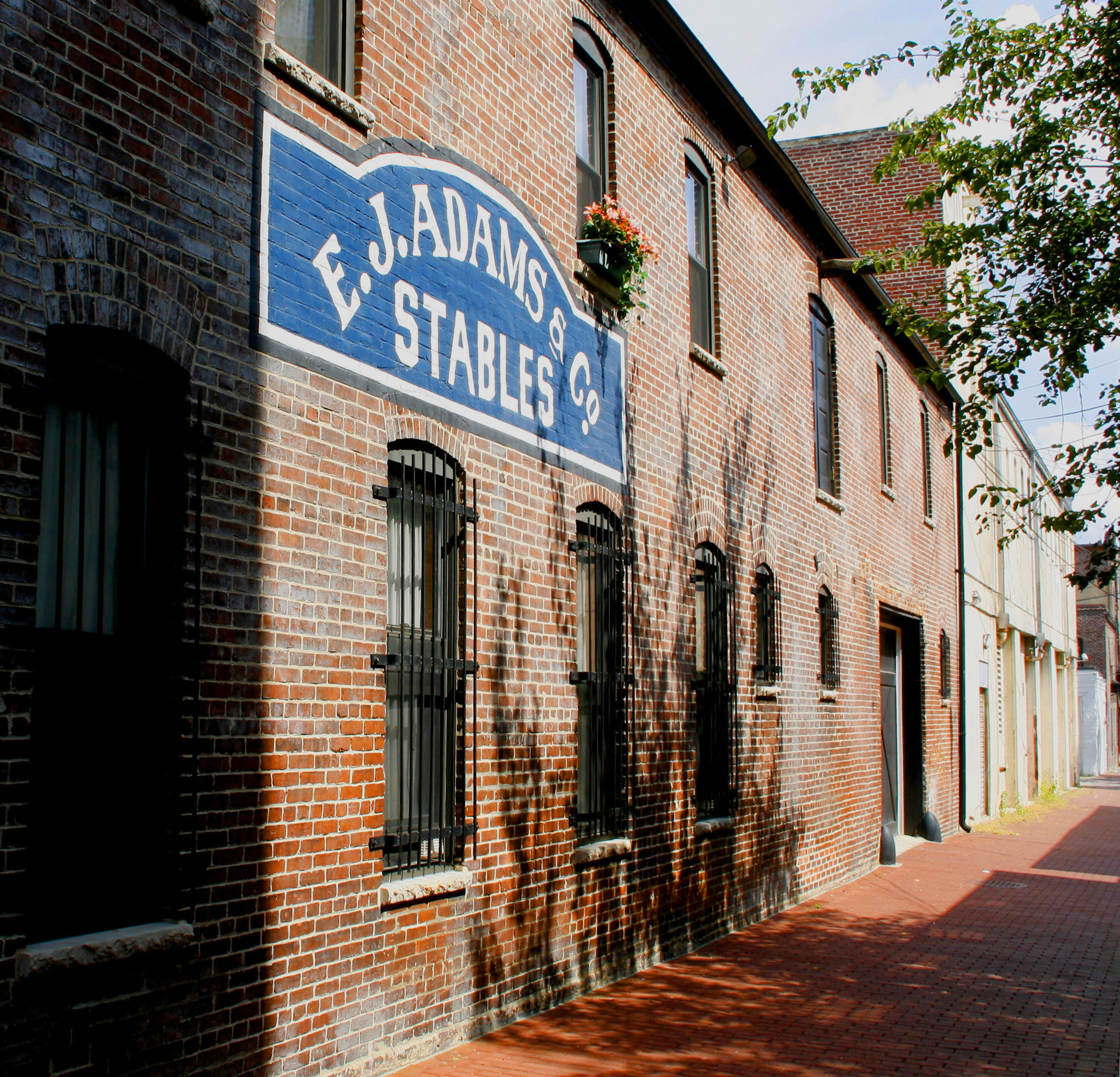
Naylor Court

In 1990, the Blagden Alley Association of local homeowners submitted an application to the District's Historic Preservation Review Board to have Blagden Alley and Naylor Court designated as a historic district. It was listed in the National Register of Historic Places on November 16, 1990. The listing included 156 contributing buildings, with the majority constructed in the 19th century, including three houses dating back to the 1830s and 40s. In addition to the Blanche K. Bruce House, the work of several notable architects were identified, including Queen Anne style brickwork on buildings designed by Nicholas T. Haller, the Romanesque Revival style of Thomas Franklin Schneider and Paul J. Pelz, the Classical Revival style of B. Stanley Simmons and Albert H. Beers, and also a residence designed by T. J. Collins.

The D.C. Archives and Record Center moved into the former B.F. McCaully & Co. Tally-Ho Stables in Naylor Court in 1990, but the facility fell into disrepair over the next decade – the archives hold the original wills of Dolley Madison, Francis Scott Key, Frederick Douglass, Henry Adams, Woodrow Wilson, Alexander Graham Bell and Louis D. Brandeis.

== Modern redevelopment ==
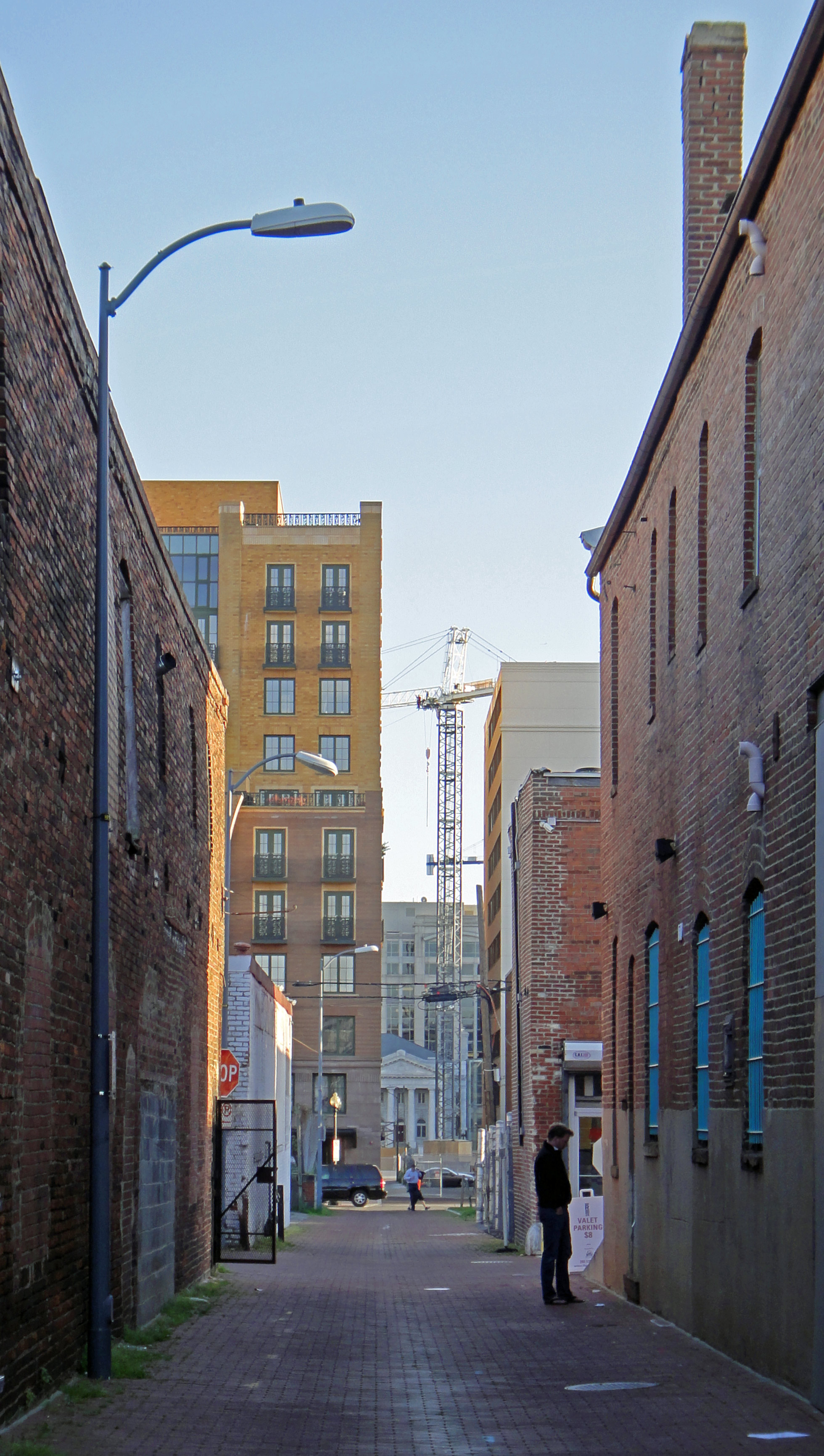
Blagden Alley

In 1996, the alleys were rezoned from residential to commercial. New development accelerated with the opening of the Walter E. Washington Convention Center nearby in 2003.

Blagden Alley was home to a thriving arts scene in the late 1990s, centered around the Signal 66 Art Space and the Planet Vox TV studio. Fight Club DC, an indoor skate park and music venue, was in Blagden Alley in the mid-2000s. The alley walls and garage doors display a collection of murals and mosaics, part of the D.C. Alley Museum, founded in 2015. One of the more notable murals is "LOVE" by Lisa Marie Thalhammer.

Cafes, restaurants, and bars began opening in the alleys after 2010. A sandwich shop, SUNdeVICH, opened in Naylor Court in 2011, to citywide acclaim. The A&D Tavern opened at the 9th St. entrance to Naylor Court in late 2012. The owners of the building restored a faded sign on the building for "Julius Viedt Jr. Groceries." La Colombe Coffee Roasters opened its first D.C. location in Blagden Alley in 2014. Michelin-starred restaurant The Dabney opened in 2015, and the cocktail bar Columbia Room from award-winning mixologist Derek Brown opened in 2016.
