= Derek Brown (mixologist) =

American mixologist

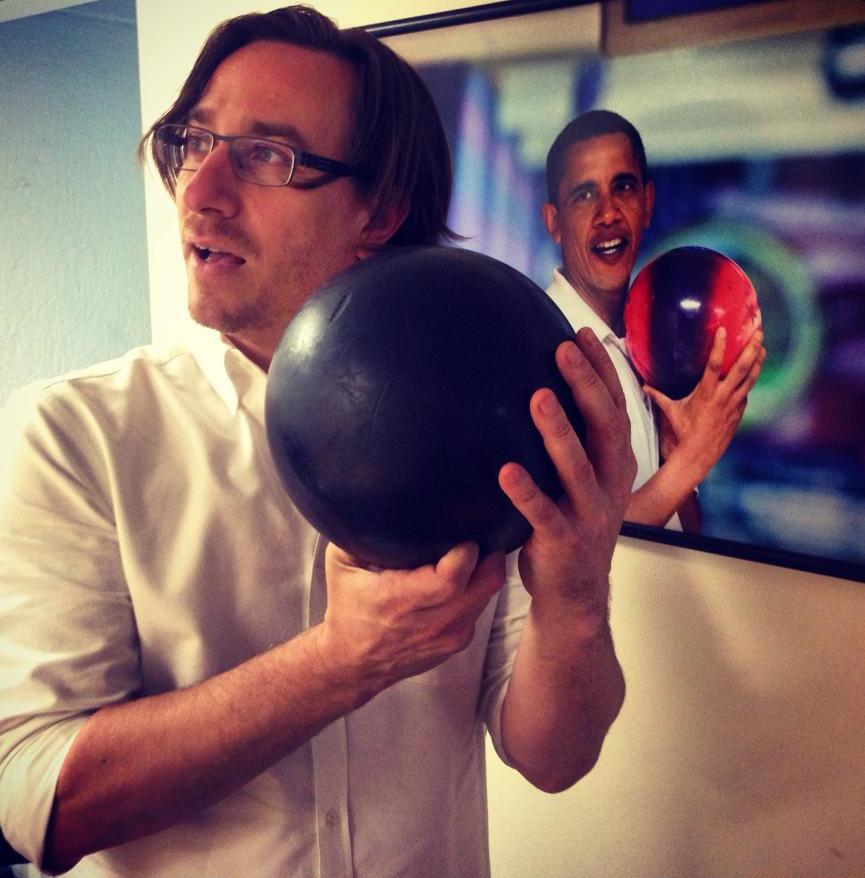
- Derek Brown bowling at the Eisenhower Executive Office Building
- Born: 21 September 1974 (age 51); Washington, D.C.
- Occupations: Entrepreneur, Mixologist, Writer
- Organization: Drink Company
- Known for: Columbia Room, The Passenger, Mockingbird Hill, Eat the Rich, Southern Efficiency

Derek Brown (born September 21, 1974) is an American entrepreneur, writer, and bartender. He owned the bars Columbia Room, The Passenger, Mockingbird Hill, Eat the Rich, and Southern Efficiency in Washington, D.C. Brown is a Distinguished Fellow at Catholic University's Ciocca Center for Principled Entrepreneurship.

== Early life ==
Brown was born in Washington D.C. and grew up in Olney, Maryland. He lived briefly in Charleston, South Carolina and Atlanta, Georgia before returning to the D.C. area to attend George Mason University.

== Career ==
=== Beginnings ===
Brown began bartending in 2000 at Rocky's, a bar in the Adams Morgan neighborhood of Washington D.C., before moving on to Chef Frank Ruta's Palena and becoming interested in wine. He started working at Michel Richard's Citronelle under the tutelage of sommelier Mark Slater and then moved on to work alongside Chef Johnny Monis as the sommelier at restaurant Komi and was included in Wine & Spirits magazine's 2007 Top 5 New Sommeliers in America. While at Komi, Brown was a founder of the underground cocktail club Hummingbird to Mars that operated out of Bourbon in Adams Morgan.

He returned to the bar full-time in 2008. He worked alongside owners Ian and Eric Hilton to open the speakeasy The Gibson on the 14th Street Corridor in Washington, D.C., which served classic cocktails.

=== The Passenger and Columbia Room ===
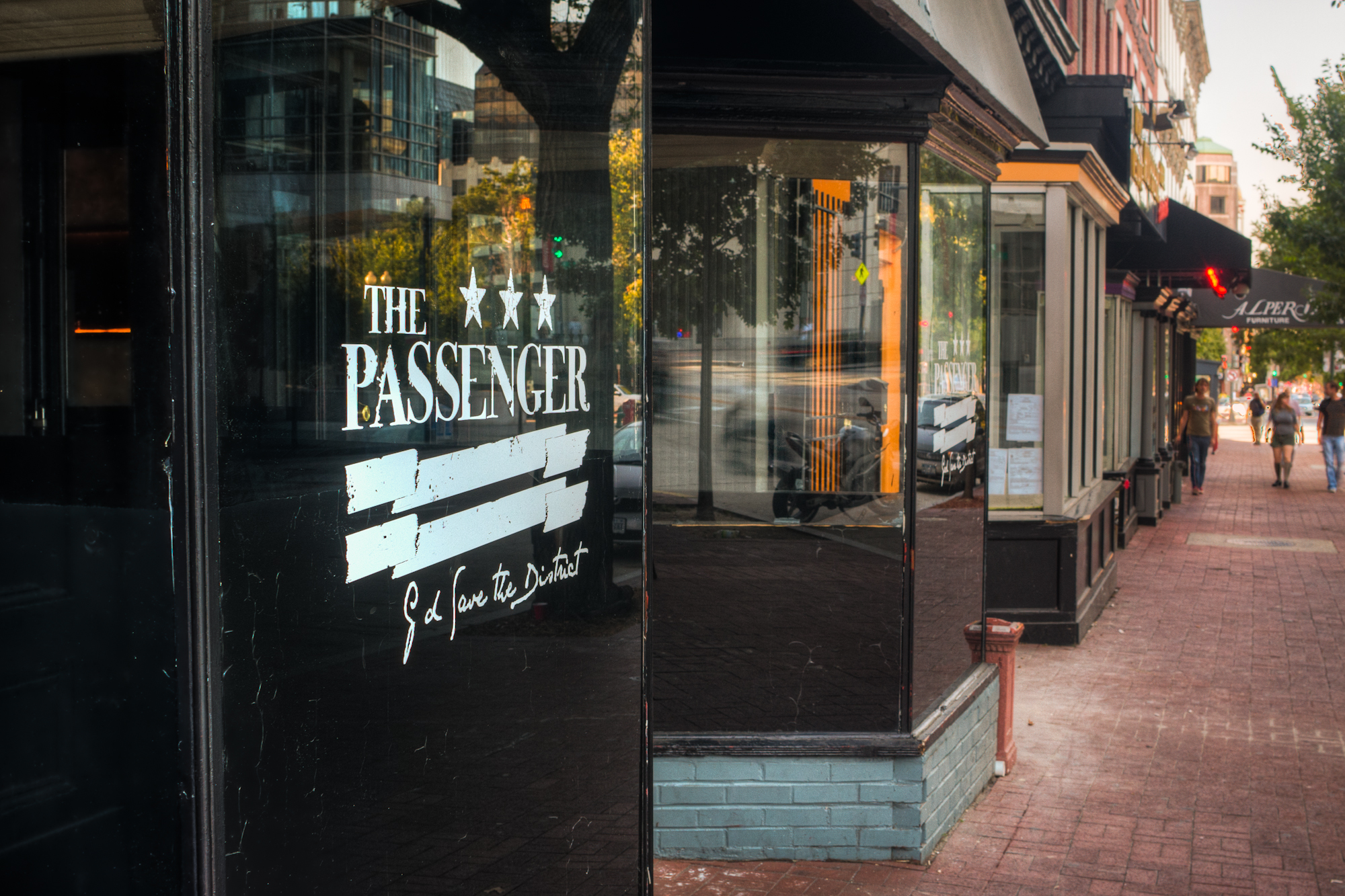
The Passenger

In 2009, restaurateur Paul Ruppert approached Brown about opening a bar in a space adjacent to the Warehouse Theatre. Brown brought his brother Tom Brown on board, a bartender at wine bar Cork at the time, and they decided to turn the space into two projects. The first was The Passenger, which opened in November 2009. The Passenger is named after the Iggy Pop song of the same name.

In March 2010, they opened the Brown's Columbia Room, a 10-seat cocktail location in the back of The Passenger. Columbia Room focuses on a tasting menu that combines seasonal ingredients, classic cocktails, and attention to craftsmanship.

==== Recognition ====
- 2010 Bon Appetit Top 10 New Cocktail Bars in the U.S.: Columbia Room
- 2010 GQ 25 Best Cocktail Bars in America: Columbia Room
- 2011 US Airways Magazine 14 Most Trend-Setting Restaurants in the US: The Passenger and Columbia Room
- 2011 Garden & Gun Best New Bars: Columbia Room
- 2011 Travel + Leisure America's Best Cocktail Bars: Columbia Room
- 2012 Food & Wine 50 Best Bars in America: The Passenger and Columbia Room
- 2012 USA Today 10 Great Classic American Cocktail Bars: The Passenger and Columbia Room
- 2012 James Beard Foundation Semi-finalist for Outstanding Bar Program: Columbia Room
- 2012 Washington Post Dining Guide Critic's Rating 3 Stars: Columbia Room
- 2012 Tales of the Cocktail Spirited Awards Top 4 Nominees - Best American Cocktail Bar: Columbia Room
- 2012 Travel & Leisure America's Best Cocktail Bars: Columbia Room
- 2013 Esquire 25 Best Bars in America: Columbia Room
- 2013 Washington's 18 Most Iconic Drinks: Columbia Room's Dry Martini
- 2014 James Beard Foundation Semi-finalist for Outstanding Bar Program: Columbia Room
- 2016 Departures Magazine Best New Cocktail Bars in America
- 2017 James Beard Foundation Semi-finalist for Outstanding Bar Program: Columbia Room
- 2017 Spirited Awards: Best American Cocktail Bar

==== Closing and Re-Opening ====
On January 1, 2015, The Passenger and Columbia Room closed. The building at 1021 7th St NW was sold to make way for an office and retail development by Douglas Development Corp. The Columbia Room re-opened in Blagden Alley in February 2016 under Brown's direction. The Passenger re-opened north of its old location on 7th Street in the fall of 2016 under the sole ownership of Tom Brown.

=== Drink Company ===
Formerly known as Laughing Cocktail, Drink Company is owned by Brown and Angie Fetherston. They formed their partnership in April 2010 and have since worked together on many projects, including a trio of bars named Mockingbird Hill, Eat the Rich, and Southern Efficiency - known as the DB3 - in the Shaw neighborhood. They also led the efforts in working with D.C. City Council to pass a proclamation naming the Rickey the official cocktail of Washington, D.C., with the author of Prohibition in Washington D.C. Garrett Peck.

Mockingbird Hill, Eat the Rich, and Southern Efficiency were named among Bon Appétit magazine's 2014 "50 Best New Restaurants in America". After a period of time when the three bars were turned into a seasonal, pop-up model, the location closed.

==== Mockingbird Hill ====
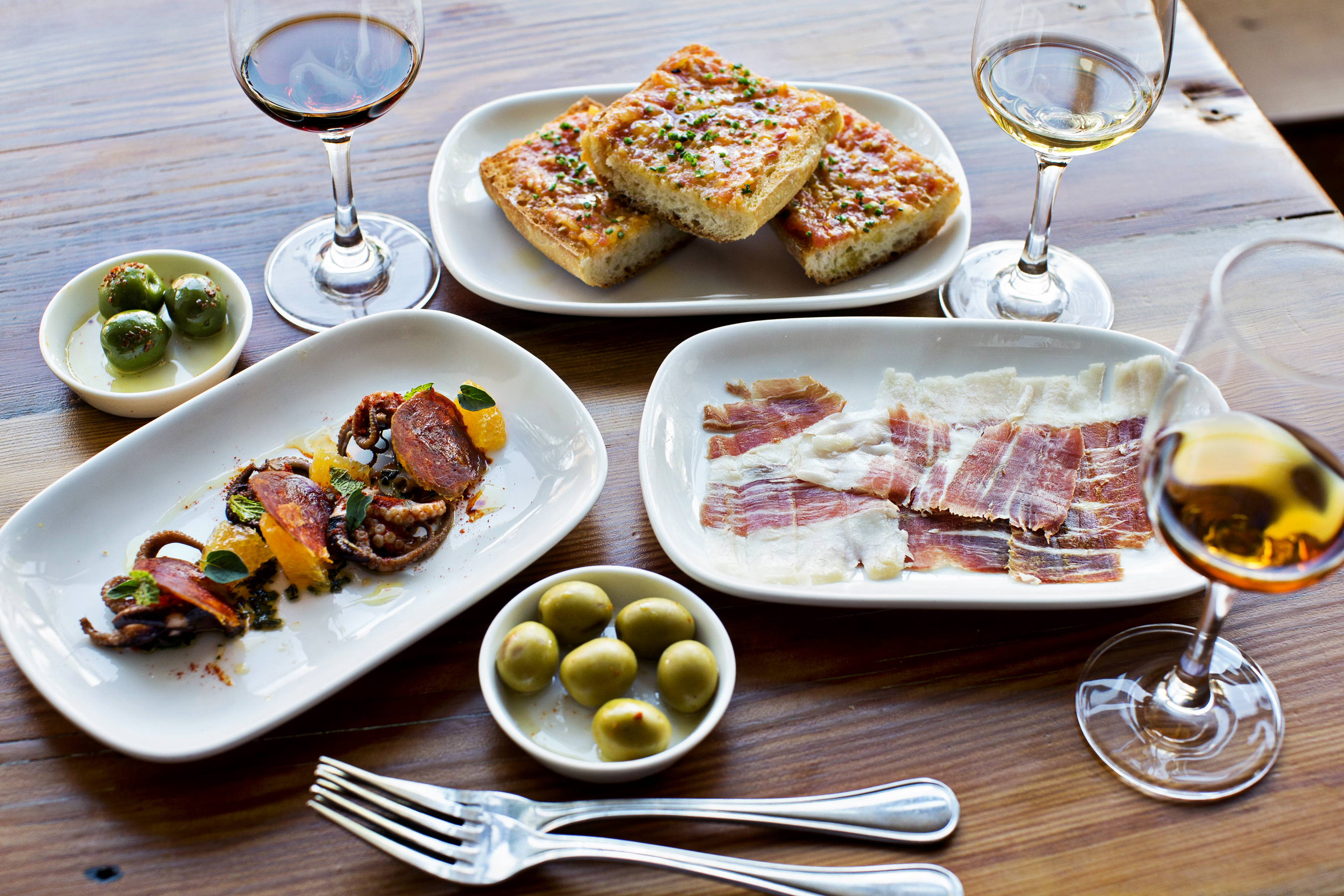
Mockingbird Hill

Mockingbird Hill, which opened on June 5, 2013, was a bar that specialized in sherry and was influenced by bars in Madrid. The name of the bar was derived from The Clash song Spanish Bombs which pays homage to those who fought against the fascist regime in the Spanish Civil War.

- 2013 Garden & Gun 10 Best New Bars
- 2013 Zagat Hottest new bars in D.C.
- 2013 Washington Post: 2 stars
- Washington Post: 13 Best Local Dishes of 2013: Trout Salad
- 2014 Tales of the Cocktail Spirited Awards Best New Bar semifinalist
- 2014 New York Times: 6 Innovative Ice Coffees
- 2014 Southern Living 100 Best Bars in the South

==== Eat the Rich ====
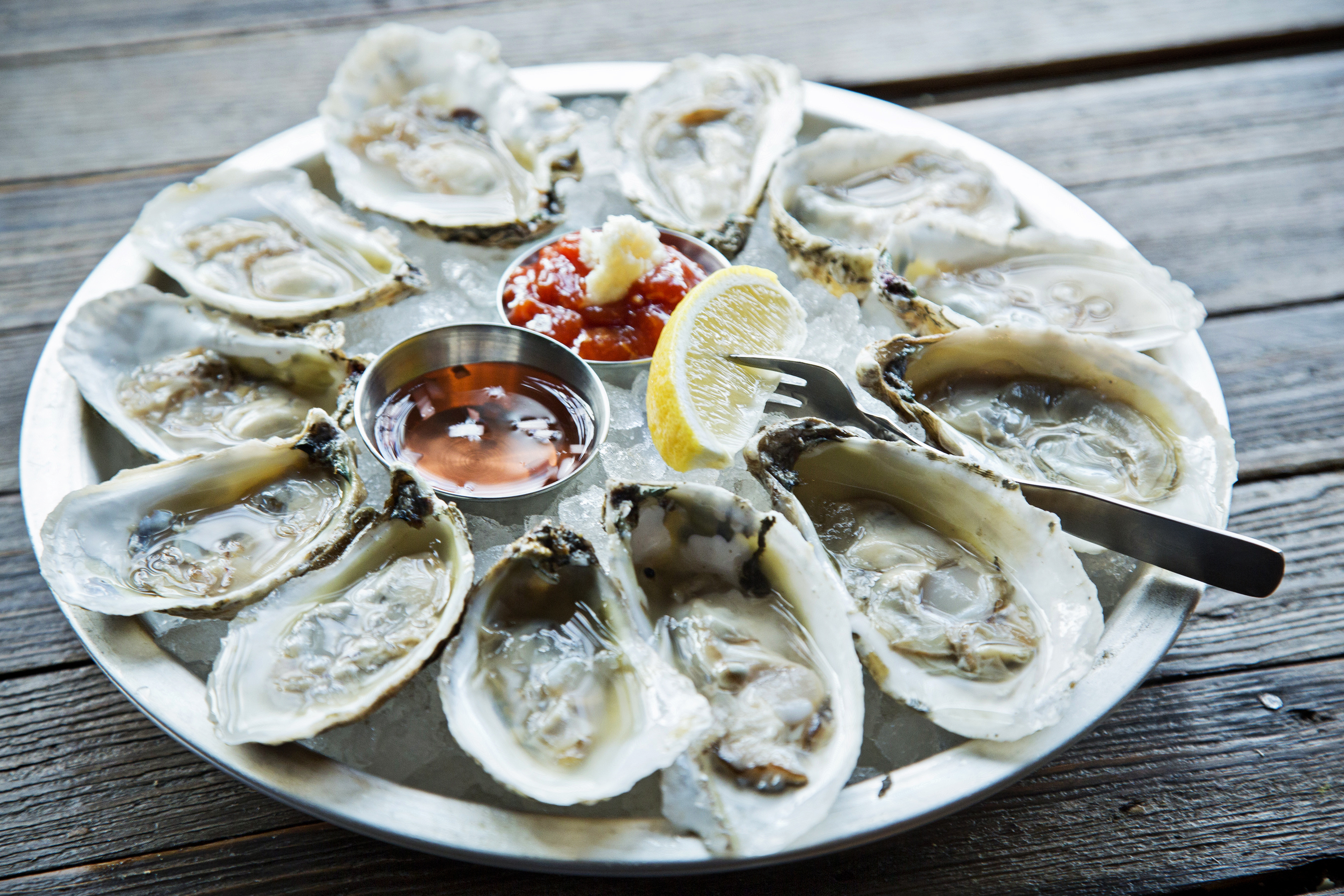
Eat the Rich

Eat the Rich, which opened on October 18, 2013, was an oyster bar created by Brown, Angie Fetherston, and oysterman Travis Croxton of Rappahannock River Oysters. Featuring local oysters and a Chesapeake Bay-centric menu, Eat the Rich was a tribute to the oyster houses of Washington, D.C., and Mid-Atlantic cuisine.

- Eat the Rich received a 2.5-star rating by Washington Post restaurant critic Tom Sietsema.
- 2014 Best of D.C. Brunch Dish: Chesapeake Boil

==== Southern Efficiency ====
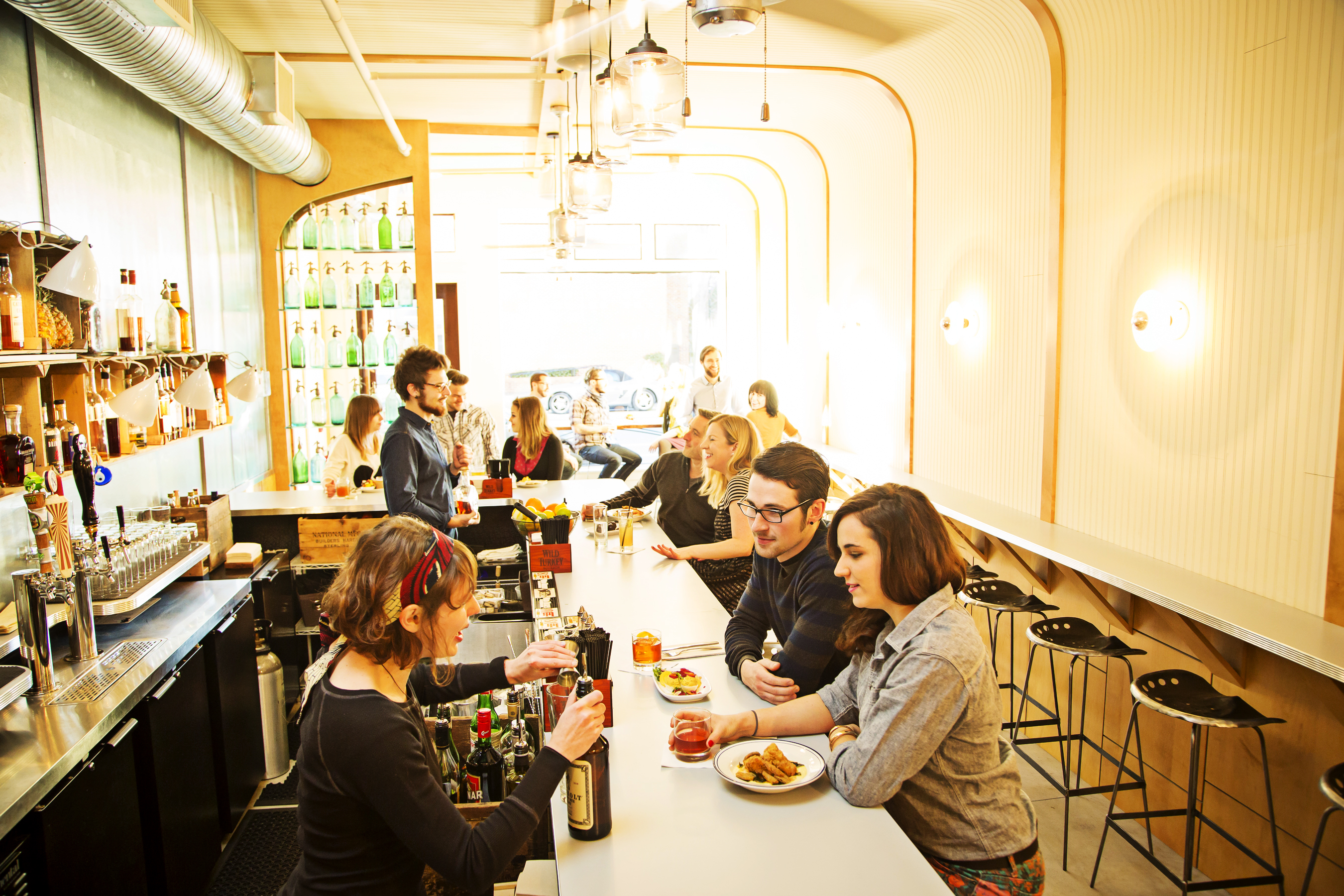
Southern Efficiency

Southern Efficiency, which opened on December 21, 2013, was a Southern food and whiskey bar.

- 2014 Food & Wine The People's Best New Bar (Northeast)
- 2014 Zagat 10 hottest bars in D.C.
- 2014 Eater D.C. Best Bartender: JP Fetherston
- Washington Post: 40 Dishes Washingtonians must try in 2014: Peanut Soup

=== Writing ===
Brown had a regular web column for The Atlantic from 2009 to 2011. He is now a freelance writer with articles published in The Washington Post, The Huffington Post, Entrepreneur Magazine, Punch Magazine, Table Matters, and Bon Appétit Magazine.

In 2019, Brown (with Robert Yule) published Spirits Sugar Water Bitters, an outgrowth of his work as Chief Spirits Advisor to the National Archives Foundation.

In 2022, Brown published Mindful Mixology: A Comprehensive Guide to No- and Low-Alcohol Cocktails with 60 Recipes, an outgrowth of his work advocating for mindful drinking by both workers and patrons in bars.

== Professional accolades ==
- 2007 Wine & Spirits Top Five Sommeliers in the U.S.
- 2010 Washingtonian 40 Who Shaped 2010
- 2010 James Beard Foundation Awards Semi-finalist (Wine & Spirits Professional)
- 2010 The Wall Street Journal "A Master of Mixological Science" Feature
- 2014 StarChefs Rising Star Restaurateur of the Year
- 2015 Imbibe Magazine's Bartender of the Year
- 2015 James Beard Foundation Awards Semi-finalist (Wine & Spirits Professional)

== Personal life ==
Derek Brown lives in Washington, D.C., with his son.

== Interests and advocacy ==
Brown has been involved in charitable initiatives related to hunger relief, including participation in events associated with Share Our Strength, a non-profit organization with the stated goal of ending childhood hunger in the United States. He's also an Ambassador of Washington, D.C., for Destination D.C., an organization that supports tourism and travel to D.C. He has also advocated for responsible, mindful drinking and non-alcoholic cocktail recipes.
