= Cynthia Brock-Smith =

American politician

Secretary of the District of Columbia
- In office 2011–2014
- Mayor: Vincent C. Gray
- Preceded by: Naomi Shelton
- Succeeded by: Sharon Anderson (acting)

Personal details
- Party: Democratic
- Education: University of Maryland, College Park (BA)

Cynthia Brock-Smith is an American government official who served as the Secretary of the District of Columbia under Mayor Vincent C. Gray from 2011 to 2014. During her tenure, she was a member of the National Association of Secretaries of State.

== Education ==
Brock-Smith earned a Bachelor of Arts degree in political science from the University of Maryland, College Park.

== Career ==
Prior to serving in city government, she was the Senior Vice President of the District of Columbia Chamber of Commerce and director of congressional relations at the United States Office of Personnel Management during the presidency of Bill Clinton. She also has worked on the staff of the United States House Committee on Appropriations and United States House Committee on Rules. She is a former president of the National Forum for Black Public Administrators.

A member of the Democratic Party, she served as Deputy Director of the Committee on Rules at two of her party's national conventions. Since 2014, Brock-Smith has served as Assistant Vice President for External Affairs at Howard University.

Political offices
| Preceded by Naomi Shelton | Secretary of the District of Columbia; 2011–2014 | Succeeded by Sharon Anderson; Acting |
