= Cuisine of the Mid-Atlantic states =

Style of food

The cuisine of the Mid-Atlantic states encompasses the cuisines of the states of New York, New Jersey, Pennsylvania, Delaware, and Maryland, as well as Washington, D.C. The influences on cuisine in this region of the United States are extremely eclectic, as it has been, and continues to be, a gateway for international culture as well as a gateway for new immigrants.

== Colonial times ==
Going back to colonial times, each new group has left their mark on homegrown cuisine and in turn the cities in this region disperse trends to the wider United States. In addition to importing and trading the finest specialty foods from all over the world, cities such as Baltimore and Philadelphia have had the past influence of Italian, German, Irish, British and Jewish cuisines and that continues to this day, and Baltimore has become the crossroads between North and South, a distinction it has held since the end of the Civil War.

== Alcoholic beverages ==
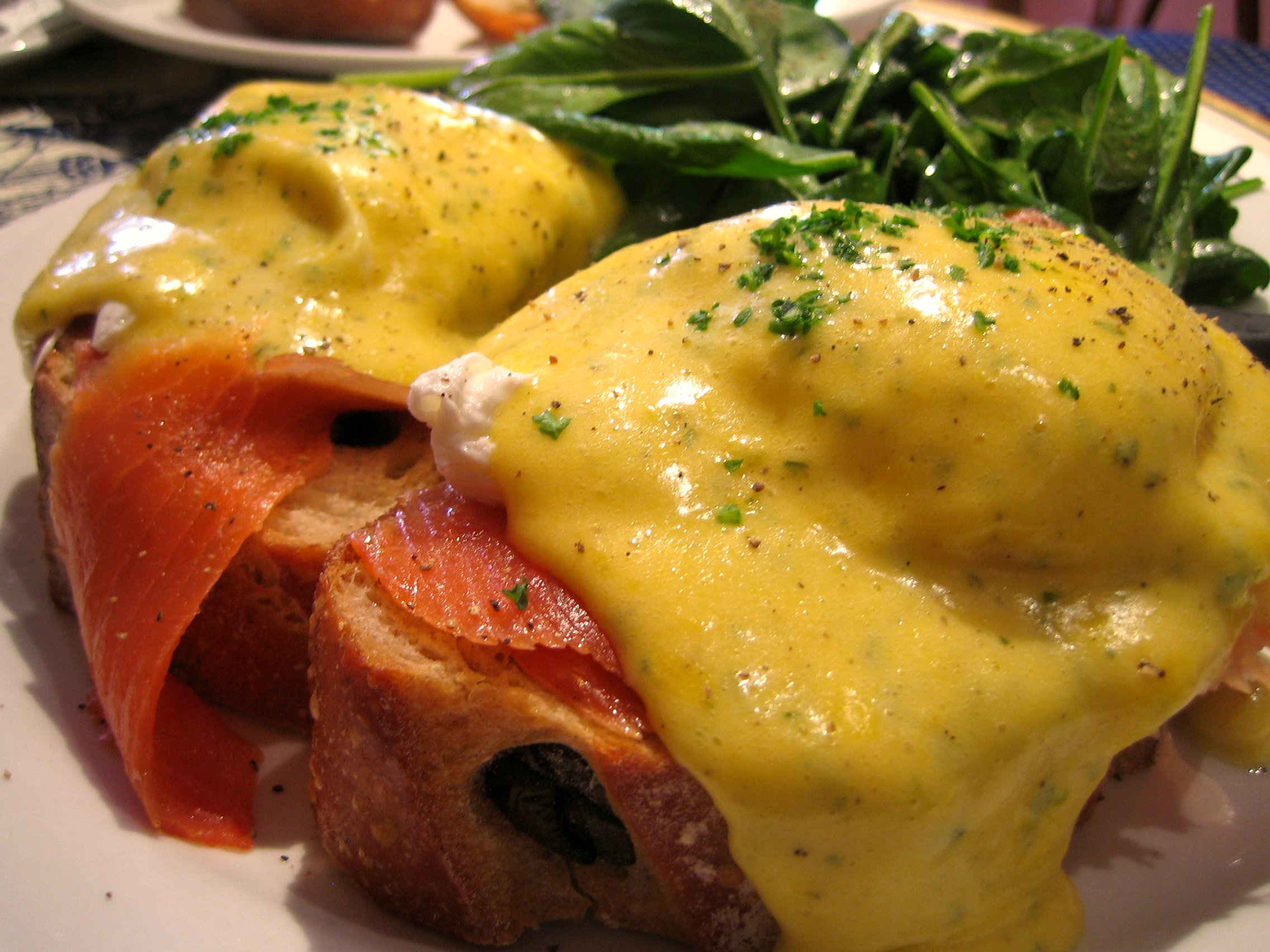
Eggs Benedict, a breakfast dish made with poached eggs and hollandaise sauce, served with smoked salmon

Since the first reference to an alcoholic mixed drink called a cocktail comes from New York State in 1803, it is thus not a surprise that there have been many cocktails invented in New York and the surrounding environs. Long Island iced teas, Manhattans, Rob Roys, Tom Collins, Aviations, and Greyhounds were all invented in New York bars, and the gin martini was popularized in New York in speakeasies during the 1920s, as evidenced by its appearance in the works of New Yorker and American writer F. Scott Fitzgerald. New York State is the third most productive area in the country for wine grapes, just behind the more famous California and Washington. It has American Viticultural Area's near the Finger Lakes, the Catskills, and Long Island. In the Hudson Valley, it has the second most productive area in the country for growing apples, making it a center for hard cider production, just like New England. Pennsylvania has been growing rye since Germans began to emigrate to the area at the end of the 17th century and required a grain they knew from home. Therefore, overall it is not unusual to find New York grown Gewürtztraminer and Riesling, Pennsylvania rye whiskey, or marques of locally produced ciders like Original Sin on the same menu.

== Complicated dishes ==
Many of the more complicated dishes with rich ingredients like Lobster Newberg, Waldorf salad, vichyssoise, eggs benedict, and the New York strip steak were born out of a need to entertain and impress the well to do in expensive bygone restaurants like Delmonico's and still standing establishments like the Waldorf-Astoria Hotel, and today that tradition remains alive as some of the most expensive and exclusive restaurants in the country are found in this region.

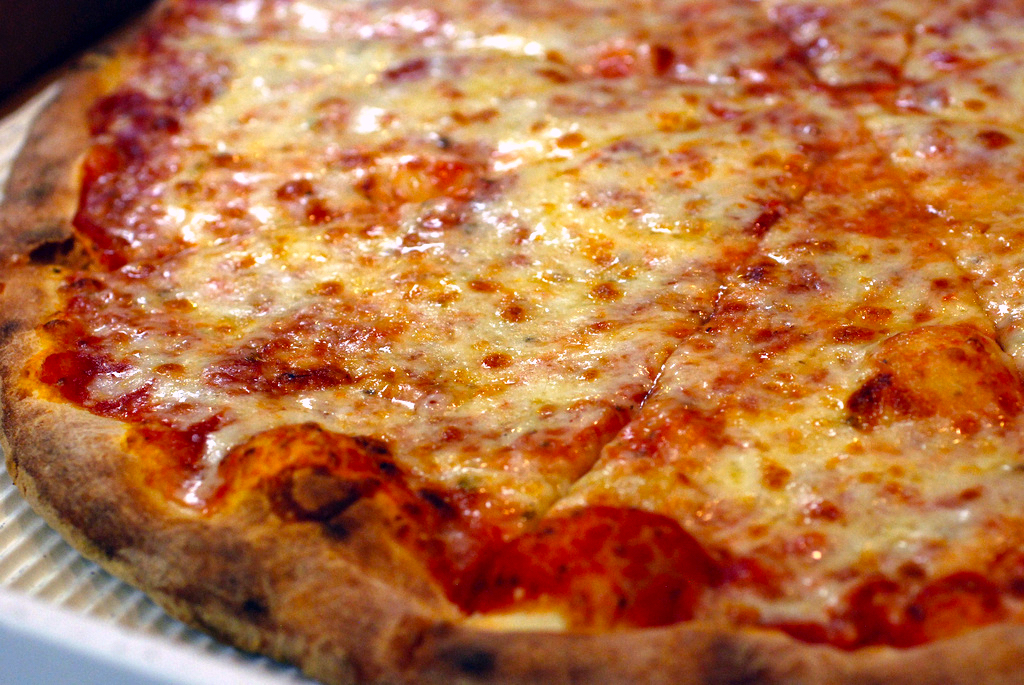
New York-style pizza

Since their formative years, New York City, New Jersey, Philadelphia, and Baltimore have welcomed immigrants of every kind to their shores, and all four have been an important gateway through which new citizens to the general United States arrive. Traditionally natives have eaten cheek to jowl with newcomers for centuries as the newcomers would open new restaurants and small businesses and all the different groups would interact. Even in colonial days this region was a very diverse mosaic of peoples, as settlers from Switzerland, Wales, England, Ulster, Wallonia, Holland, Gelderland, the British Channel Islands, and Sweden sought their fortune in this region. This is very evident in many signature dishes and local foods, all of which have evolved to become American dishes in their own right. The original Dutch settlers of New York brought recipes they knew and understood from home and their mark on local cuisine is still apparent today: in many quarters of New York their version of apple pie with a streusel top is still baked, while originating in the colony of New Amsterdam their predilection for waffles in time evolved into the American national recipe and forms part of a New York brunch, and they also made coleslaw, originally a Dutch salad, but today accented with the later 18th century introduction of mayonnaise. The internationally famous American doughnut began its life originally as a New York pastry that arrived in the 18th century as the Dutch olykoek.

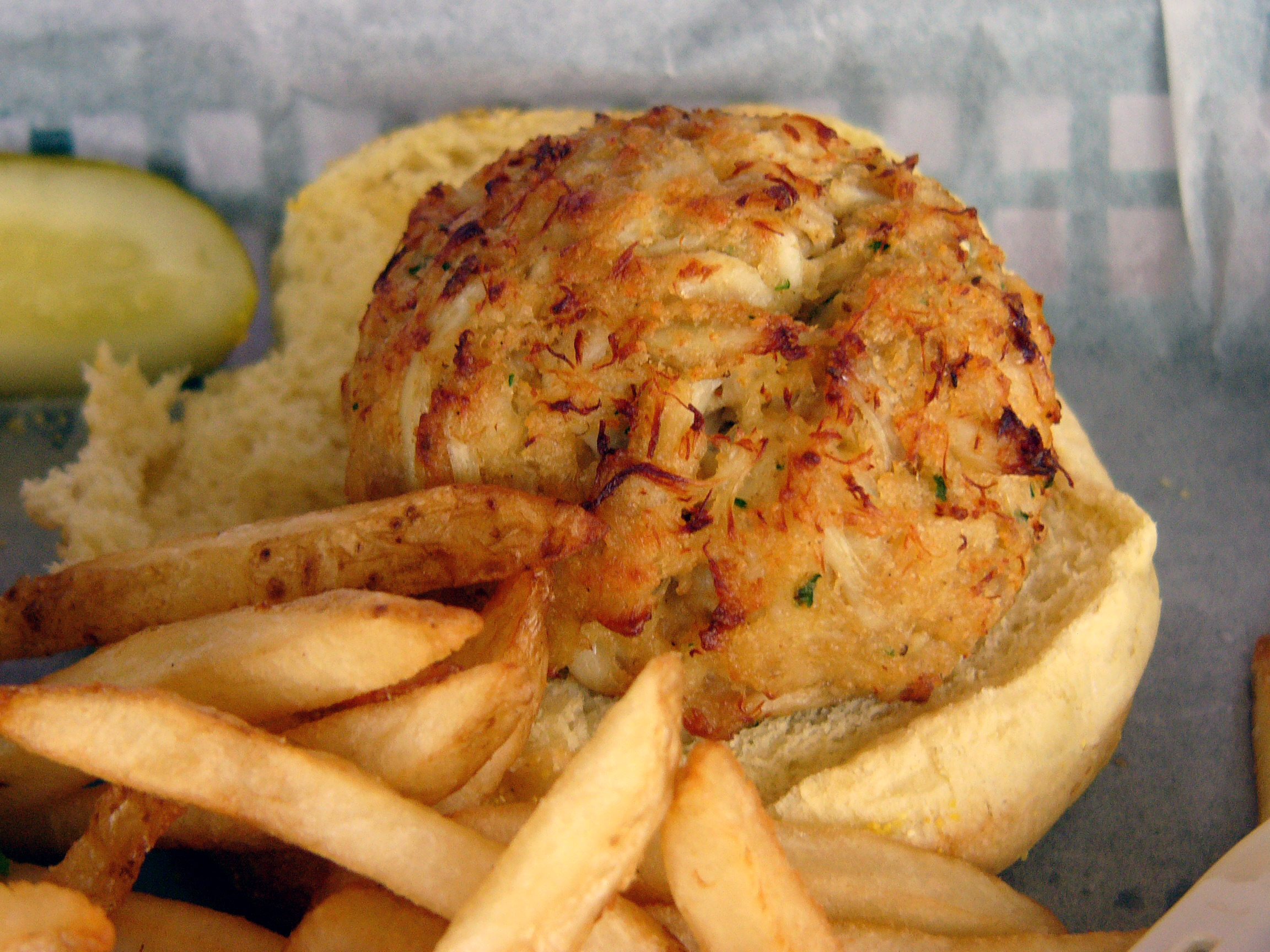
Crab cake served on a bun

Crabcakes were once a kind of English croquette, but over time as spices have been added they and the Maryland crab feast became two of Baltimore's signature dishes; fishing for the blue crab is a favorite summer pastime in the waters off Maryland, New Jersey, Long Island, and Delaware where they may be eaten at summer picnics. Other mainstays of the region have been present since the early years of American history, like oysters from Cape May, the Chesapeake Bay, and Long Island, and lobster and tuna from the coastal waters found in New York and New Jersey, which are exported to the major cities as an expensive delicacy or a favorite locavore's quarry at the multitude of farmer's markets, very popular in this region. Philadelphia pepper pot, a tripe stew was originally a Caribbean dish but today is a classic of home cooking in Pennsylvania alongside bookbinder soup, a type of turtle soup. In winter, New York pushcarts sell roasted chestnuts, a delicacy dating back to English Christmas traditions, and it was in New York and Pennsylvania that the earliest Christmas cookies were introduced: Germans introduced crunchy molasses based gingerbread and sugar cookies in Pennsylvania, and the Dutch introduced cinnamon based cookies, all of which have become part of the traditional Christmas meal. Scrapple was originally a type of savory pudding that early Pennsylvania Germans made to preserve the offal of a pig slaughter. The Philadelphia soft pretzel was originally brought at the beginning of the 18th century to Eastern Pennsylvania and later 19th century immigrants sold them to the masses from pushcarts to make them the city's best-known bread product, having evolved into its own unique recipe.

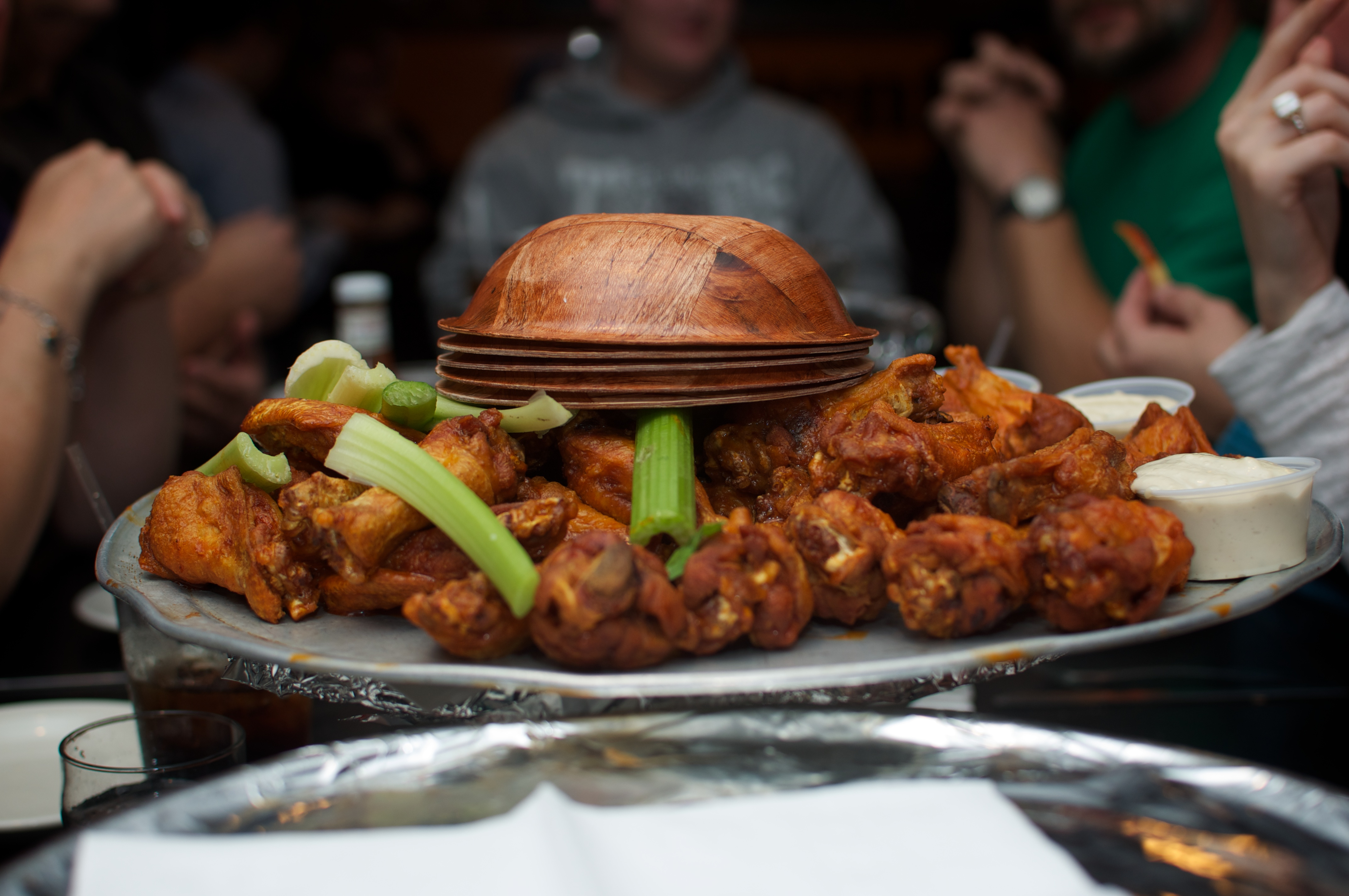
A plate of Buffalo wings

== 19th century immigrants ==
After the 1820s, new groups began to arrive and the character of the region began to change. There had been some Irish from Ulster prior to 1820, however largely they had been Protestants with somewhat different food patterns and (often) a different language than the explosion of emigrants that came to Castle Garden and Locust Point in their masses starting in the 1840s. Taverns had existed prior to their emigration to America in the region, though they brought their particular brand of pub culture and founded some of the first saloons and bars that served stout.

Irish were the first immigrant group to arrive in this region in massive numbers. Immigrants also founded some of the earliest saloons and bars in this region, of which McSorley's is an example. Immigrants from Southern Europe, namely Sicily, Campania, Lazio, and Calabria, appeared between 1880-1960 in New York, New Jersey, Pennsylvania, and Eastern Maryland hoping to escape the extreme poverty and corruption endemic to Italy; typically they were employed in manual labor or factory work but it is because of them that dishes like spaghetti with meatballs, New York style pizza, calzones, and baked ziti exist, and Americans of today are very familiar with semolina based pasta noodles.

New York style hot dogs came about with German speaking emigrants from Austria and Germany, particularly with the frankfurter sausage and the smaller wiener sausage. Today the New York style hot dog with sauerkraut, mustard, and the optional cucumber pickle relish is such a part of the local fabric that it is one of the favorite comestibles of New York City. Hot dogs are a typical street food sold year round in all but the most inclement weather from thousands of pushcarts. As with all other stadiums in Major League Baseball they are essential for New York Yankees and the New York Mets games though it is the local style of preparation that predominates without exception. Hot dogs are also the focus of a televised eating contest on the Fourth of July in Coney Island, at Nathan's Famous, one of the earliest hot dog stands opened in the United States in 1916.

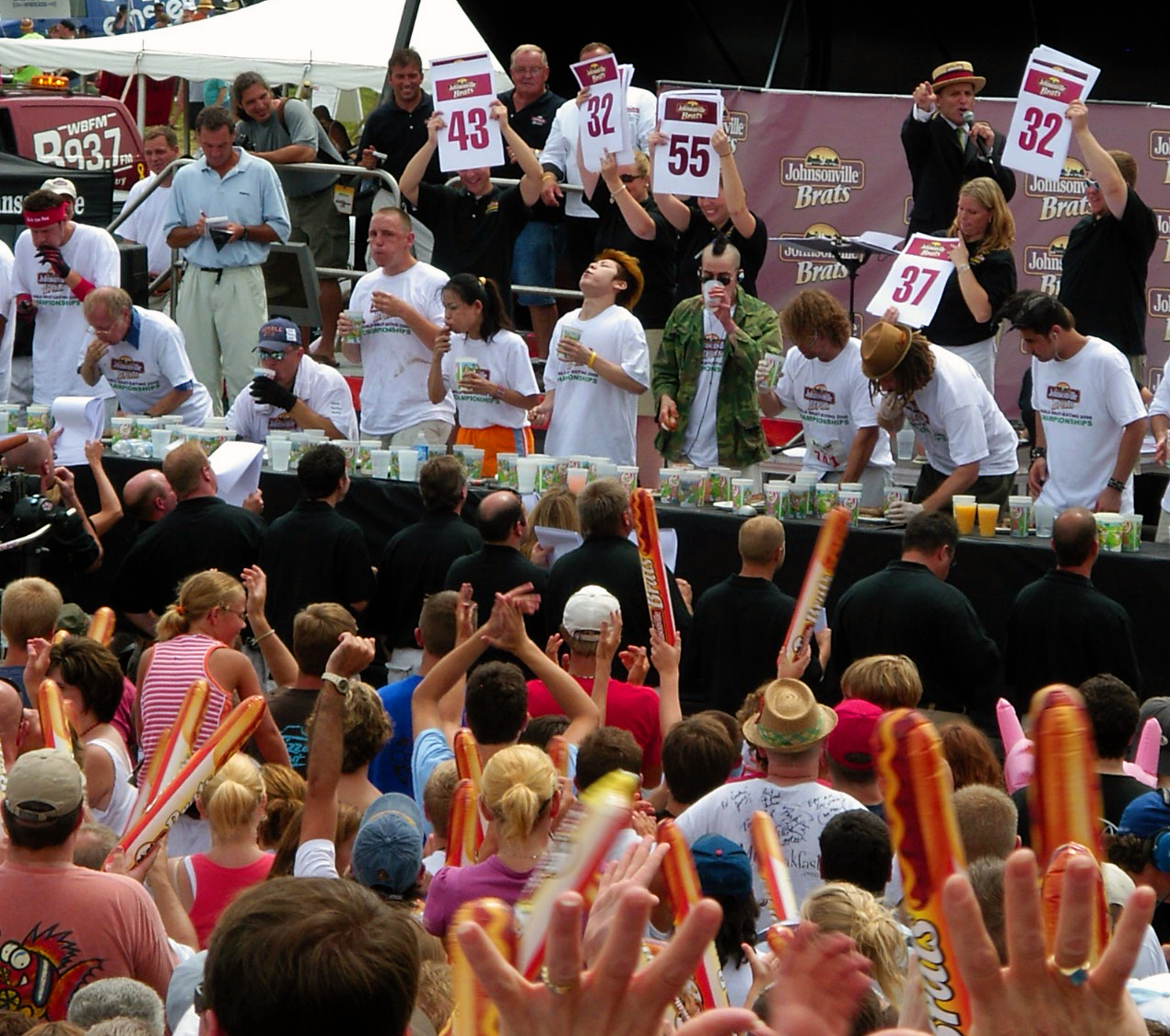
Every year on Coney Island, New Yorkers celebrate the Fourth of July by attending or participating in Nathan's hot dog eating contest.

== 20th century ==
A summertime treat, Italian ice, began its life as a lemon flavored penny lick brought to Philadelphia by Italians; its Hispanic counterpart, piragua, is a common and evolving shaved ice treat brought to New York by Puerto Ricans in the 1930s. Unlike the original dish which included flavors like tamarind, mango, coconut, piragua is evolving to include flavors like grape, a fruit not grown in Puerto Rico. Pork roll, a meat delicacy of New Jersey, first appeared around the time of the Civil War and today is often served for breakfast with eggs and cheese on a kaiser roll, the bread upon which this is served was brought to the area by Austrians in the second half of the nineteenth century and is a very common roll for sandwiches at lunchtime, usually tipped with poppyseeds. This breakfast meat is generally known as pork roll in southern New Jersey and Philadelphia, and Taylor Ham in northern New Jersey, although Taylor Ham is technically a brand of pork roll.

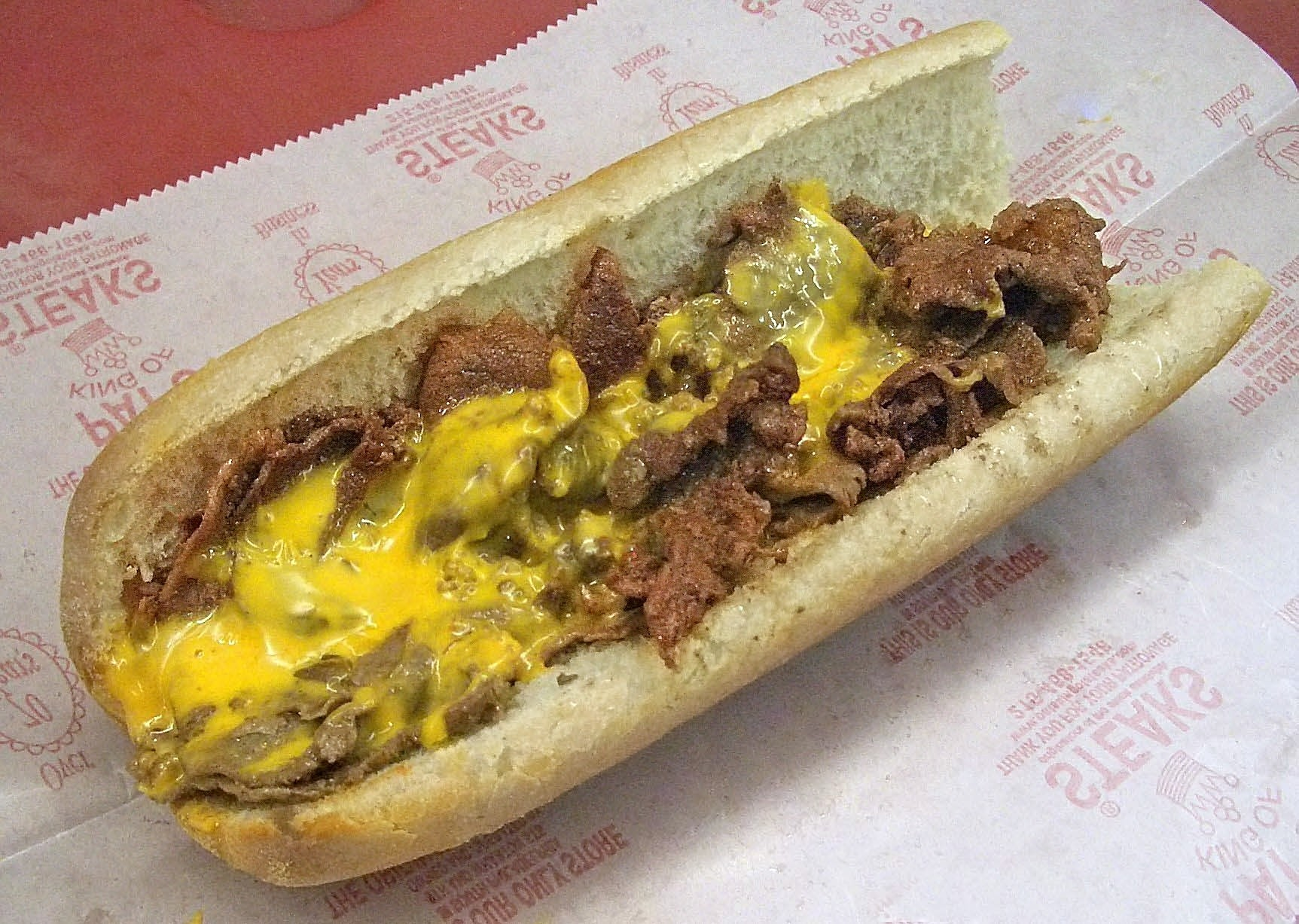
Philadelphia cheesesteak "wiz wit", i.e. steak, Cheez Whiz, "wit" onions

Other dishes came about during the early 20th century and have much to do with delicatessen fare, set up largely by Jewish immigrants from Eastern Europe who came to America incredibly poor and most often unable to partake in the outdoor food markets that the general population utilized. The influence of European Jewry on modern mid-Atlantic cooking remains extremely strong and reinforced by their many descendants in the region. American-style pickles were brought by Eastern European Jews, now a common addition to hamburgers and sandwiches, and Hungarian Jews brought a recipe for almond horns that now is a common regional cookie, diverting from the original recipe in dipping the ends in dark chocolate. New York-style cheesecake has copious amounts of cream and eggs because animal rennet is not kosher and thus could not be sold to a large number of the deli's clientele. New York inherited its bagels and bialys from Jews, as well as challah bread, the bread today most favored for making French toast in New York, New Jersey, and eastern Pennsylvania. Pastrami first entered the country via Romanian Jews, and is a feature of many sandwiches, often eaten on marble rye, a bread that was born in the mid Atlantic. Whitefish salad, lox, and matzoh ball soup are now standard fare made to order at local diners and delicatessens, but started their life as foods that made up a strict dietary code.

Like other groups before them, many of their dishes passed into the mainstream enough so that they became part of diner fare by the end of the 20th century, a type of restaurant that is now more numerous in this region than any other and formerly the subject matter of artist Edward Hopper. In the past this sort of establishment was the haven of the short order cook grilling or frying simple foods for the working man. Today typical service would include regional staples like beef on weck, Manhattan clam chowder, the club sandwich, Buffalo wings, Philadelphia cheesesteak, the black and white cookie, shoofly pie, snapper soup, Smith Island cake, grape pie, milkshakes, and the egg cream, a vanilla or chocolate fountain drink with a frothy top and fizzy taste. As in Hopper's painting from 1942, many of these businesses are open 24 hours a day.
