= Kimberly A. Bassett =

American politician

Kimberly Bassett
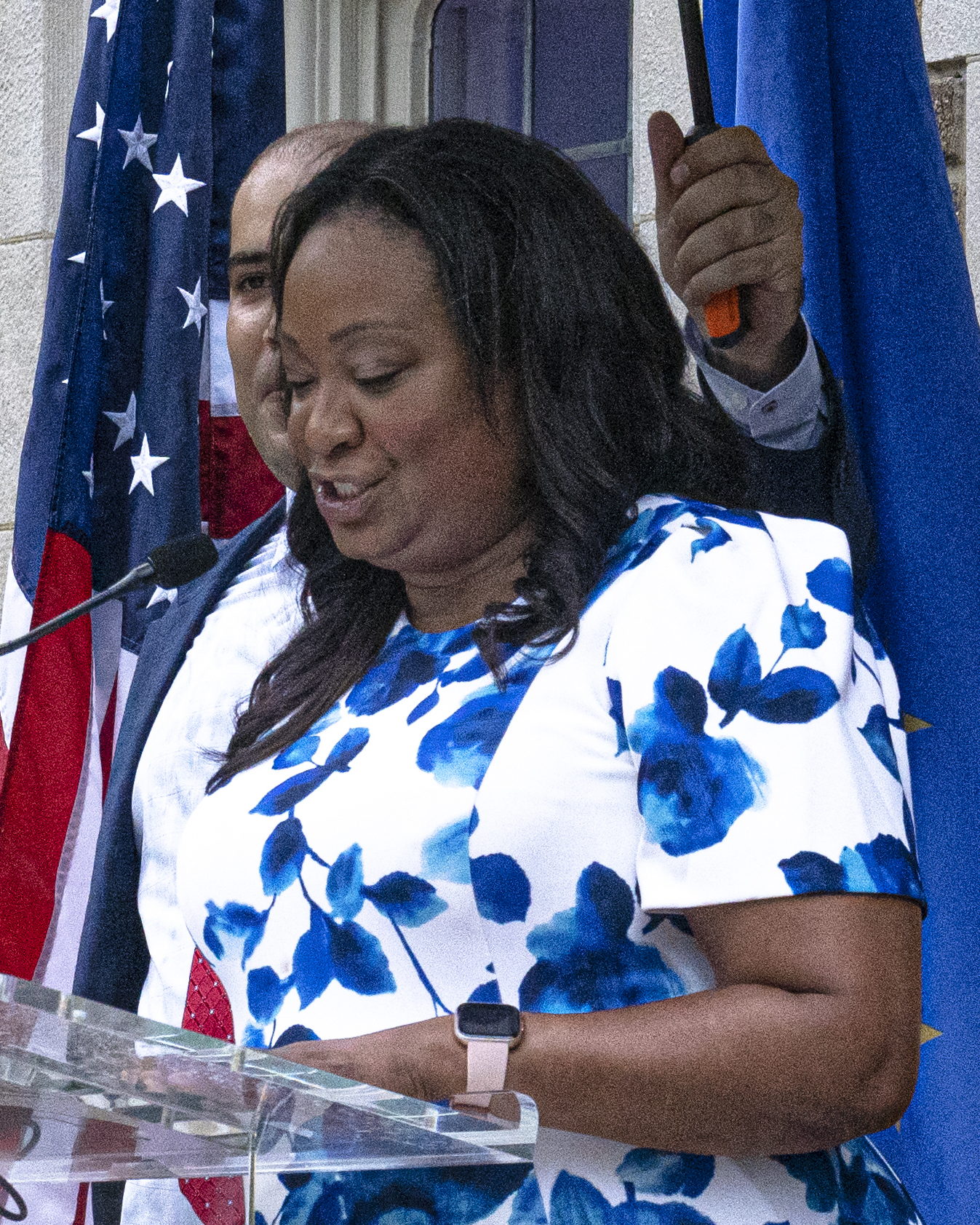

Secretary of the District of Columbia
- Incumbent
- Assumed office December 11, 2018
- Mayor: Muriel Bowser
- Preceded by: Lauren Vaughan

Personal details
- Party: Democratic
- Education: North Carolina Central University (BA); North Carolina A&T State University (MA)

Kimberly Ann Bassett is an American civil servant serving as secretary of the District of Columbia. Bassett was appointed by Washington, D.C. Mayor Muriel Bowser in December 2018, succeeding Lauren Vaughan.

== Education ==
Bassett earned a Bachelor of Arts from North Carolina Central University and a Master of Arts from North Carolina A&T State University.

== Career ==
Prior to assuming her role as secretary, Bassett worked in Muriel Bowser's mayoral administration as an advisor and director of the mayor's office on women’s policy and initiatives. Bassett previously worked as the executive director of CTIA and director of external affairs for C&P Telephone. Bassett also worked as an appointee in the United States Department of Education during the Clinton administration and for the Democratic Party.

Political offices
Preceded by Lauren Vaughan	Secretary of the District of Columbia; 2018–present	Incumbent
