= List of American spies =

This is a list of spies who engaged in direct espionage. It includes Americans spying against their own country and people spying on behalf of the United States.

== American Revolution era spies ==
=== Spied for the Patriots ===
- Hercules Mulligan
- Abraham Woodhull
- Benjamin Edes
- Nathan Hale
- Benjamin Tallmadge
- Caleb Brewster
- William H. Dobbs (Captain)
- Clément Gosselin
- Daniel Bissell
- David Henley
- Enoch Crosby
- Ethan Allen
- Filippo Mazzei
- Henry K. Van Rensselaer
- John Brown of Pittsfield
- John Champe
- John Clark
- John Honeyman
- John Laurens
- Jonathan L. Austin
- Lydia Darrah
- Paul Revere
- Pierre Ayotte
- Silas Deane
- Van Rensselaer's Regiment
- William Bingham

==== Culper Ring ====
- Abraham Woodhull
- Agent 355
- Anna Strong
- Austin Roe
- Benjamin Tallmadge
- Robert Townsend
- Sarah Townsend
- Caleb Brewster
- Cato
- James Rivington
- Jonas Hawkins

=== Spied for the Crown ===
- Ann Bates
- Benedict Arnold
- Benjamin Church
- Miss Jenny
- Metcalf Bowler
- John André

=== Double agents ===
- Edward Bancroft
- James Armistead Lafayette
- John Champe

== American Civil War era spies ==
=== Union spies ===
- Albert D. Richardson
- Charles C. Carpenter
- Elizabeth Van Lew
- Mary Bowser
- George Curtis
- Harriet Tubman
- Kate Warne
- Lafayette C. Baker
- Pauline Cushman
- Philip Henson
- Sarah Emma Edmonds
- Timothy Webster
- Allan Pinkerton
- John Scobell
- Grenville Dodge
- Hattie Lawton
- Pryce Lewis

=== Confederate spies ===
- Alexander Keith, Jr.
- Annie Jones
- Antonia Ford
- Belle Boyd
- Confederate Signal Bureau
- David Owen Dodd
- Dr. William Joseph Heacker
- Henry Thomas Harrison
- James Dunwoody Bulloch
- John Yates Beall
- Richard Thomas (Zarvona)
- Sarah Ewing Sims Carter Gaut
- Euphemia Mary Goldsborough Willson
- Rose O'Neal Greenhow
- Sarah Slater
- Thomas A. Jones
- Thomas Harbin
- Thomas Jordan
- Virginia Bethel Moon
- William Bryant
- William Norris

== American World War One era spies ==
- Julius Klein
- Marguerite Harrison
- Sylvanus Morley
- Sidney Mashbir

== American World War Two era spies ==
- Amy Elizabeth Thorpe
- Arthur Goldberg
- Arthur M. Schlesinger, Jr.
- Claire Phillips
- Eric Erickson
- Frederick Mayer
- Fritz Kolbe
- Virginia Hall
- Joan Bondurant
- John Birch
- Martin Quigley, Jr.
- Moe Berg
- Rene Joyeuse
- Richard Sakakida
- Sidney Mashbir
- Sterling Hayden
- William G. Sebold
- Harold Ware

== American Cold War era spies ==
=== Spied for America ===
- Aleksandr Dmitrievich Ogorodnik
- Arkady Shevchenko
- Boris Morros
- Boris Yuzhin
- Francis Gary Powers
- Gerry Droller
- Heinz Barwich
- John Birch
- Miles Copeland, Jr.
- Milton Bearden
- Nicholas Shadrin
- Otto von Bolschwing
- Peter Burke, 1979 secretary in the US embassy in Poland
- Philip Agee
- Robert Baer
- Ruth Fischer
- Yosef Amit
- Yuri Nosenko
- Oleg Penkovsky
- Valery Martinov
- Vitaly Yurchenko
- Dmitri Polyakov
- Oleg Gordievsky
- Adolf Tolkachev
- Ramón Grau

=== Spied for USSR ===
- Agnes Smedley
- Al Sarant
- Alan Nunn May
- Aldrich Ames
- Alexander Koral
- Alfred Tilton
- Allan Robert Rosenberg
- Anatole Volkov
- Arthur Adams
- Arvid Jacobson
- Bela Gold
- Bill Weisband
- Boris Morros
- Charles Kramer
- David Greenglass
- Donald Niven Wheeler
- Donald Heathfield
- Earl Browder
- Elizabeth Zarubina
- Frank Coe
- George Koval
- George Silverman
- Harold Glasser
- Harry Dexter White
- Harry Gold
- Harry Magdoff
- Hede Massing
- Helen Silvermaster
- Herbert Fuchs
- Irving Kaplan
- Irving Lerner
- Jacob Golos
- Jane Foster Zlatovski
- John Abt
- John Herrmann
- John Anthony Walker
- Julian Wadleigh
- Juliet Stuart Poyntz
- Julius Rosenberg
- Ethel Rosenberg
- Klaus Fuchs
- Lauchlin Currie
- Lee Pressman
- Lona Cohen
- Louis F. Budenz
- Martha Dodd Stern
- Michael Lance Walker, son of John Anthony Walker
- Morris Cohen
- Morton Sobell
- Nathan Gregory Silvermaster
- Nathan Witt
- Nathaniel Weyl
- Noel Field
- Reino Häyhänen
- Robert Hanssen
- Russell Alton McNutt
- Saville Sax
- Solomon Adler aka Schlomer Adler
- Sonia Steinman Gold
- Theodore Hall
- Tracey Foley
- Victor Perlo
- Vilyam Genrikhovich Fisher
- Vincent Reno
- Ward Pigman
- Whittaker Chambers
- William Henry Taylor
- William August Fisher aka Rudolf Ivanovich Abel
- William "Lud" Ullman

=== Spied for Vietnam ===
- David Truong
- Ronald Humphrey

=== Spied for Israel ===
- Jonathan Pollard
- Ben-Ami Kadish

== Post-Cold War spies ==
=== Spied on Iran for America ===
- Shahram Amiri

=== Spied on Russia for America ===
- Valery Mikhailov
- Col. Vladimir Lazar

=== Spied on America for Russia ===
- The Russian 10 from the Illegals Program included: Richard and Cynthia Murphy, Juan Lazaro, Vicky Peláez and Anna Chapman

=== Spied on America for China ===
- Katrina Leung
- Chi Mak
- Glenn Duffie Shriver
- Noshir Gowadia

=== Spied on America for Cuba ===
- Carlos Alvarez
- Elsa Alvarez
- Ana Montes
- Kendall Myers
- Gwendolyn Myers
- Victor Manuel Rocha (US ambassador)
- Wasp Network
- Mariano Faget Jr.

=== Spied on America for South Africa ===
- Theresa Squillacote

=== Spied on Cuba for America ===
- Rolando Sarraff Trujillo

== American Gulf War era spies ==
- April Fool

== Americans who spied for foreign countries ==
=== CIA ===
- Aldrich Ames
- David Henry Barnett
- Harold James Nicholson
- Larry Wu-Tai Chin
- Sharon M. Scranage
- William Kampiles
- Tony Mendez

=== NSA ===
- David Sheldon Boone
- Ronald Pelton

=== FBI ===
- Earl Edwin Pitts
- Richard Miller
- Robert Hanssen

=== Defense Intelligence Agency ===
- Ana Belén Montes

=== Armed Forces ===
- Clayton John Lonetree
- John Anthony Walker
- Morris Cohen
- George Trofimoff
- Clyde Lee Conrad
- Peter Debbins
- Jeffrey Martin Carney
- Monica Witt

=== Federal contractors ===
- Andrew Daulton Lee
- Christopher John Boyce
- Jonathan Pollard
- Stewart Nozette

=== House Committee on Armed Services ===
- Theresa Squillacote
