= Cipriano Ferrandini =

Corsican-born French-American barber and alleged conspirator in the Baltimore Plot

- Born: 1822; Corsica, Kingdom of France
- Died: December 20, 1910 (aged 88); Baltimore, Maryland, U.S.
- Resting place: Saint Mary Catholic Cemetery, Baltimore
- Occupation: Barber
- Known for: Alleged involvement in the Baltimore Plot

Cipriano Ferrandini (also spelled Cypriano in some sources; 1822 – December 20, 1910) was a Corsican-born French immigrant to the United States who established himself as the longtime barber and hairdresser in the basement of Barnum's Hotel in Baltimore, Maryland. There he practiced his trade from the mid-1850s until his retirement, long after the close of the American Civil War. He also served as captain of the Baltimore City Guards and later held a commission as a major in the First Maryland Regiment during the administration of Governor Oden Bowie. He was accused of, but never indicted for, plotting to assassinate U.S. President-elect Abraham Lincoln during his planned visit to Baltimore on February 23, 1861. He was later detained during a secessionist dragnet in 1862 but was never prosecuted for his pro-Southern convictions or alleged membership in the Knights of the Golden Circle.

On the nights of February 21 and 22, 1861, Allan Pinkerton and Frederick Seward warned Lincoln that he ought not to appear in public in Baltimore as scheduled because plans were allegedly underway to assassinate him. Lincoln chose to heed the warning, donned a disguise of a soft cap, and passed through Baltimore unseen and unheralded on the night of February 22, leaving Mrs. Lincoln and the children to face the crowd awaiting his arrival from Harrisburg the following day, February 23, 1861.

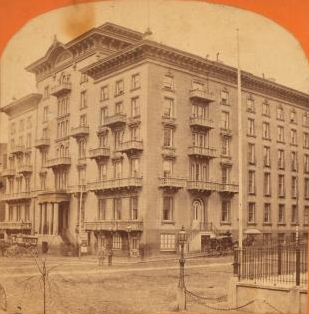
Barnum's Hotel, Baltimore

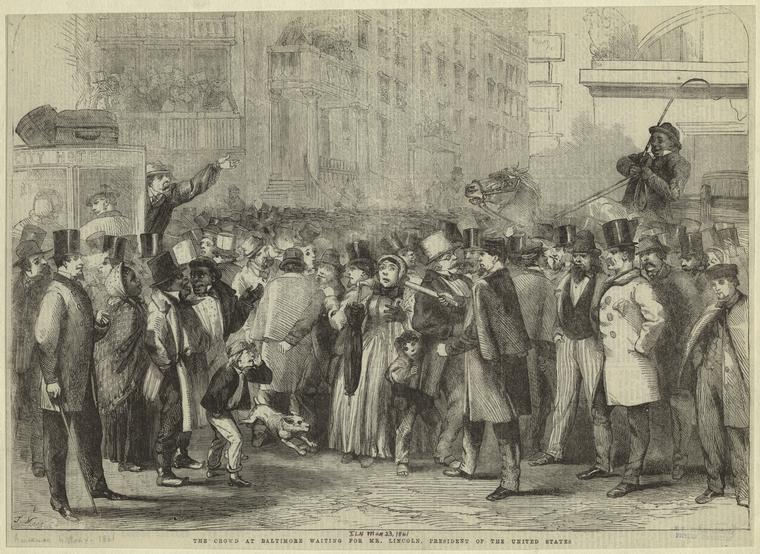
Thomas Nast's cartoon of the crowd awaiting Lincoln's arrival in Baltimore, February 23, 1861

== Role in alleged conspiracy ==
There is disagreement among historians as to whether a plot to assassinate Lincoln in Baltimore actually existed and Ferrandini's role in such a plot. John Thomas Scharf argued that there was no credible evidence of a plot and no one was ever arrested for even contemplating one, although many citizens were imprisoned without benefit of habeas corpus. William Evitts, in A Matter of Allegiances, argued in favor of the existence of such a plot based on the papers of Allan Pinkerton.

Illustration from The Spy of the Rebellion (1885) depicting Pinkerton's account of his meeting with Ferrandini.

Pinkerton's principal account of the alleged plot is the transcript of his 1861 journal. Pinkerton's account relies upon one agent and two sources to identify Ferrandini as the leader of the alleged assassination plot. His agent met with Ferrandini and reported the extent of the plot. In The Spy of the Rebellion (1885), Pinkerton asserted that, in addition to his spy Howard, he also met with Ferrandini at Guy's Monument Hotel, referring to him as "Captain Ferrandini" but elsewhere calling him "Fernandina". Pinkerton claimed that Ferrandini expressed support for assassination as a means of preventing Lincoln's inauguration.

Ferrandini's military background was well known in Baltimore. According to contemporary newspaper accounts published after his death, he served as captain of the Baltimore City Guards and later received a commission as a major in the First Maryland Regiment during the administration of Governor Oden Bowie.

Eighteen days before the alleged assassination attempt on Lincoln, Ferrandini appeared before a select committee of the United States House of Representatives investigating rumors that efforts would be made to prevent the President-elect from reaching his inauguration, or to seriously disrupt the ceremonies if he reached Washington. The committee had been appointed on January 9, 1861, in response to President James Buchanan's message concerning the secession crisis. Ferrandini told the committee that he had made his secessionist views very clear and admitted that he was applying his military training to a group dedicated to preventing the "Northern Volunteers" from passing through Maryland.

== See also ==
- American Civil War spies
- John Wilkes Booth
- Ward Hill Lamon
- George Proctor Kane
- Hattie Lawton
