= Attempted assassination of Abraham Lincoln =

Attempted assassination of Abraham Lincoln may refer to:

- Baltimore Plot, the alleged 1861 attempt
- Assassination of Abraham Lincoln, the successful 1865 attempt

== See also ==
- List of United States presidential assassination attempts and plots
