= American Civil War spies =

Tactical or battlefield intelligence became vital to both sides in the field during the American Civil War. Units of spies and scouts reported directly to the commanders of armies in the field, providing details on troop movements and strengths. The distinction between spies and scouts was one that had life-or-death consequences: if a suspect was seized while in disguise and not in his army's uniform, he was often sentenced to be hanged. A spy named Will Talbot, a member of the 35th Battalion, Virginia Cavalry, was left behind in Gettysburg after his battalion had passed through the borough on June 26–27, 1863. He was captured, taken to Emmitsburg, Maryland, and executed on orders of Brig. Gen. John Buford.

== Confederate spying ==
Intelligence-gathering for the Confederates was focused on Alexandria, Virginia, and the surrounding area.

Thomas Jordan created a network of agents that included Rose O'Neal Greenhow. Greenhow delivered reports to Jordan via the “Secret Line,” the name for the system used to get letters, intelligence reports, and other documents across the Potomac and Rappahannock rivers to Confederate officials.

The Confederacy's Signal Corps was devoted primarily to communications and intercepts, but it also included a covert agency called the Confederate Secret Service Bureau, which ran espionage and counter-espionage operations in the North, including two networks in Washington.

=== Confederate spies ===
- Joseph Baden
- Fannie Battle
- John Yates Beall
- Belle Boyd
- William Bryant
- James Dunwoody Bulloch
- Confederate Secret Service
- Sam Davis
- David Owen Dodd
- Nancy Hart Douglas
- Zora Fair
- Antonia Ford
- Sarah Ewing Sims Carter Gaut
- Mary Jane Green
- Rose O'Neal Greenhow
- Thomas Harbin
- Henry Thomas Harrison
- Elizabeth Carraway Howland
- Annie Jones
- Thomas A. Jones
- Thomas Jordan
- Alexander Keith Jr.
- Joseph Clinton Millsap
- Virginia Bethel Moon
- Samuel Mudd
- William Norris
- Emeline Piggott
- Lola Sánchez
- Sarah Slater
- Richard Thomas (Zarvona)
- William Orton Williams

== Union spying ==
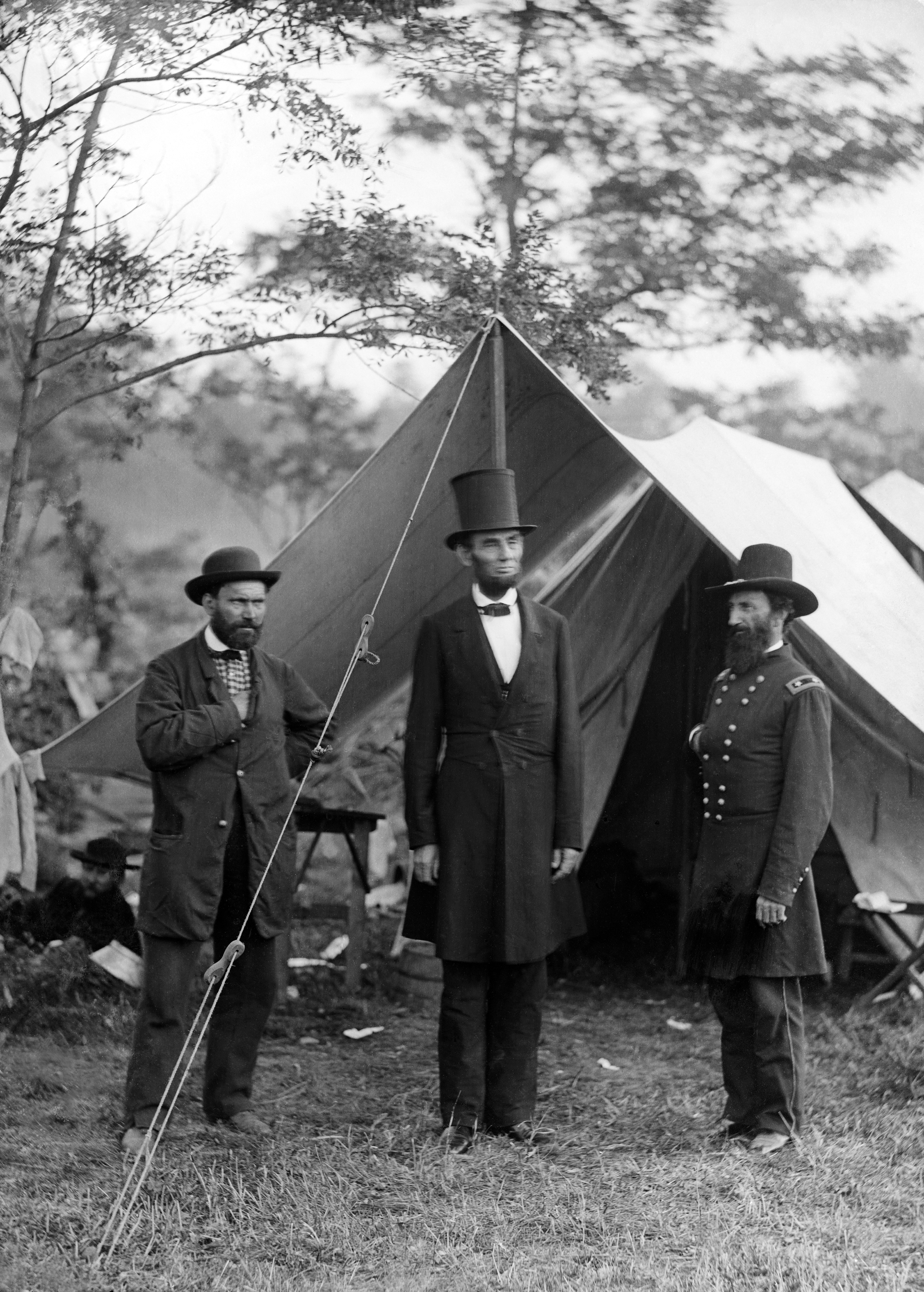
Allan Pinkerton (left) with Abraham Lincoln

The Union's intelligence-gathering initiatives were decentralized. Allan Pinkerton worked for Maj. Gen. George B. McClellan and created the United States Secret Service. Lafayette C. Baker conducted intelligence and security work for Lieutenant General Winfield Scott, commander-in-chief of the U.S. Army. President Abraham Lincoln hired William Alvin Lloyd to spy in the South and report to Lincoln directly.

As a brigadier general in Missouri, Ulysses S. Grant was ordered by Maj. Gen. John C. Frémont to start an intelligence organization. Grant came to understand the power of intelligence and later made Brig. Gen. Grenville M. Dodge the head of his intelligence operations that covered an area from Mississippi to Georgia with as many as one hundred secret agents.

Maj. Gen. Joseph Hooker, who became commander of the Army of the Potomac in January 1863, ordered his deputy provost marshal, Col. George H. Sharpe, to create a unit to gather intelligence. Sharpe set up what he called the Bureau of Military Information and was aided by John C. Babcock, who had worked for Allan Pinkerton and had made maps for George B. McClellan. Sharpe's bureau produced reports based on information collected from agents, prisoners of war, refugees, Southern newspapers, documents retrieved from battlefield corpses, and other sources. When Grant began his siege of Petersburg in June 1864, Sharpe had become Grant's intelligence chief.

African American slaves and free persons provided valuable intelligence supporting Union military operations, often exploiting their ability to move across lines without attracting attention. African American Civil War Intelligence Contributions (formerly known as Black Dispatches. contributed significantly to the Union's ultimate victory.

=== Union spies ===
- Mary Elizabeth Bowser
- Charles C. Carpenter
- George Curtis
- Pauline Cushman
- Grenville Dodge
- Sarah Emma Edmonds
- Abraham Galloway
- Philip Henson
- William J. Lawton
- Hattie Lawton
- Pryce Lewis
- Allan Pinkerton
- Albert D. Richardson
- John Scobell
- Harriet Tubman
- Elizabeth Van Lew
- Kate Warne
- Timothy Webster
