= Baltimore Plot =

Alleged attempted assassination of Abraham Lincoln

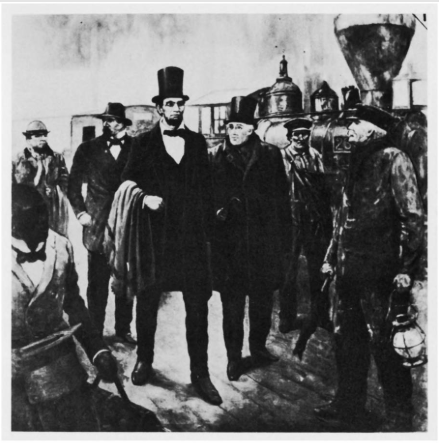
Abraham Lincoln arriving in Washington with his valet and bodyguard William Henry Johnson (left hand corner), 1861. Lincoln, Johnson, and detectives traveled a secret route from Harrisburg, Pennsylvania to Washington, D.C., to prevent an assassination attempt.

The Baltimore Plot concerned alleged conspiracies in February 1861 to assassinate President-elect of the United States Abraham Lincoln during a whistle-stop tour en route to his inauguration. Allan Pinkerton, founder of the Pinkerton National Detective Agency, played a key role in managing Lincoln's security throughout the journey. Though scholars debate whether or not the threat was real, Lincoln and his advisors clearly believed that there was a threat and took actions to ensure his safe passage through Baltimore. He ultimately arrived secretly in Washington, D.C., on February 23, 1861.

A planned train route through Bellaire, Ohio, to Wheeling, Virginia (now in West Virginia) and eastward was subsequently rerouted up through the Pittsburgh vicinity, through Pennsylvania, into Maryland, and eventually to Washington. He passed through Baltimore unnoticed, which proved controversial after newspapers revealed the seemingly cowardly decision. The incident and its significance have since been debated by scholars.

== Background ==
On November 6, 1860, Lincoln was elected as the 16th president of the United States, a Republican, and the first to be elected from that party. Shortly after his election, many representatives from the South made it clear that the Confederacy's secession from the U.S. was inevitable, which greatly increased tension across the nation.

Allan Pinkerton was commissioned by the railroad's president, Samuel M. Felton, to provide security for the president-elect on his journey to Washington, D.C. The only north-south rail line to Washington was through Baltimore, making it necessary for Lincoln to cross Maryland to reach the capital, therefore potentially dangerous for the Republican president-elect to pass through a city in which he received only two percent of the vote, and through a state in which he received "fewer than 2,300 votes".

The incoming Republican government was not about to take risks, and later that year Lincoln would suspend many civil liberties, even ordering the arrest of Maryland's state legislature for fear it might vote for secession. Pinkerton, in particular, was extremely cautious, which he would demonstrate during the coming war, when he repeatedly overestimated Confederate strength and negatively influenced Union Army policy.

== Lincoln's actions and Pinkerton's operatives ==
On February 11, 1861, President-elect Lincoln boarded an eastbound train in Springfield, Illinois, at the start of a whistle-stop tour of 70 towns and cities, ending with his inauguration in Washington, D.C. Allan Pinkerton, head of the Pinkerton Detective Agency, had been hired by railroad officials to investigate suspicious activities and acts of destruction of railroad property along Lincoln's route through Baltimore. Pinkerton became convinced that a plot existed to ambush Lincoln's carriage between the Calvert Street Station of the Northern Central Railway and the Camden Station of the Baltimore and Ohio Railroad. Pinkerton and his fellow operatives, including Kate Warne, discovered several possible plots in Baltimore. This included an investigation of Corsican hairdresser Cipriano Ferrandini, a well-established barber at Baltimore's Barnum's Hotel, and president of the pro-Confederate National Volunteers. One of Pinkerton's operatives attended a meeting in which Ferrandini made a fiery speech condemning Lincoln; after interviewing Ferrandini, they learned of several reported plans to assassinate Lincoln. While only reports from Pinkerton's operatives tied Ferrandini to the assassination conspiracy, he traveled to Mexico in 1860 to "train with a secessionist militia" and met Jerome N. Bonaparte and Thomas Winans, two individuals in the high society of Baltimore who had Confederate sympathies.

Later, Pinkerton's operatives investigated Otis K. Hillard, a member of the Palmetto Guards, a secret military organization in Baltimore. After interviewing him, they learned of several possible plots to kill Lincoln, including one where Lincoln would be surrounded by a "vast crowd" at the Camden Street depot. Another Pinkerton operative, Timothy Webster, learned about a secret league from Baltimore which had planned on destroying railroad bridges and telegraph wires and killing Lincoln. Other individuals, such as Senator William Seward and New York City police detective David S. Bookstaver, drew conclusions similar to Pinkerton's, while a congressional select committee also investigated the threat by Ferrandini. However, the committee determined that the threat wasn't real and that the evidence was not substantial. Pinkerton agents also investigated another secret society, the Knights of the Golden Circle, a White supremacist organization, which planned to create "a new nation dominated by slavery," encompassing the American South, Mexico, and the Caribbean region.

Other Pinkerton detectives included Hattie Lawton, who posed as Webster's wife. Warne was also said to be instrumental to Lincoln's safe passage to take the oath of office and in convincing Pinkerton that there was a plot to assassinate Lincoln in Baltimore. Harry W. Davies, another Pinkerton agent, also helped convince Pinkerton of the threat, and was credited with gathering and supplying information on possible plots.

On February 21, when Lincoln and his party arrived in Philadelphia, they were warned of threats to the President's life and he reportedly appreciated their suggestions but was not fearful or agitated. Frederick W. Seward, the son of William Seward, would provide a similar warning. Two days later, on February 23, Lincoln, Pinkerton, Kate Warne and the rest of Lincoln's party traveled through Baltimore without anyone recognizing them, and made it to Washington, D.C., and then to the Willard Hotel. Following the safe arrival of Lincoln, Pinkerton met James H. Luckett, his informant, who claimed he had foiled another assassination plot against Lincoln. While no harm came to Lincoln, the mayor of Baltimore, George William Brown, criticized the omission of the Baltimore stop as a "shunning" of the city and reported that a "hostile feeling" within the city resulted from the plan's revelation. The large crowd which gathered at the station to see Lincoln were disappointed.

== Public perception and legacy ==
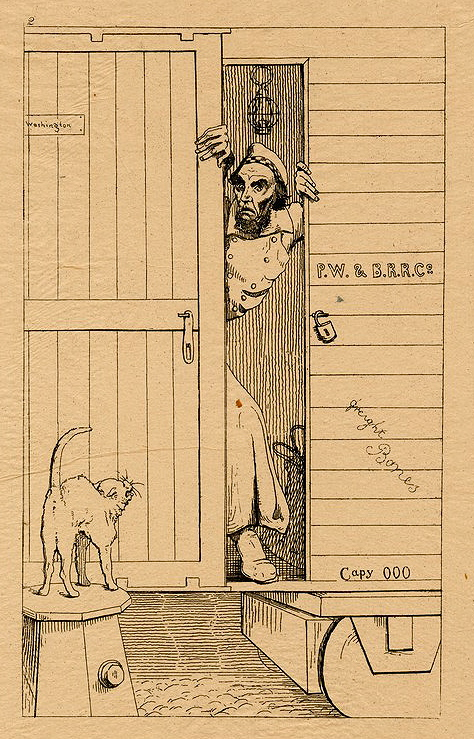
"Passage Through Baltimore". President-elect Lincoln depicted ignominiously hiding in a cattle car by Adalbert J. Volck, 1863.

Whether or not the president-elect was ever in any real danger of being assassinated, Lincoln's actions in reaching Washington, D.C. became a humiliating cause célèbre across the nation. Several elements of the initial February 23, 1861 article in The New York Times were especially damning. Primarily, the fact that such a negative report came from an ardently Republican newspaper gave it instant credibility, much more than if it had come from another source. When the Times published Joseph Howard, Jr.'s account of the President-elect disguised in a scotch-cap and long cloak, it was claimed that Lincoln was ridiculed.

Howard's article was also said to be a direct assault on Lincoln's masculinity. The article claimed that Lincoln was reluctant and too frightened to go but was compelled to by Colonel Sumner's indignation and by the insistence and shame of his wife, Mary Todd Lincoln, and several others. Newspapers also lampooned Lincoln for slipping through Baltimore in the dead of night. For instance, Adalbert J. Volck, a Baltimore dentist and caricaturist, penned a famous satirical etching titled "Passage through Baltimore". Other newspapers criticized Lincoln's action. For instance, a Vanity Fair cartoon showed Lincoln in a kilt traded for a dress the president had borrowed from his wife. The New York Tribune and Baltimore Sun also denounced Lincoln's actions, with the latter saying his presidency was "degraded" by the action. Others reported that as a result of the plot, newspapers and the general public worried they had "elected a weak, indecisive commander-in-chief." Lincoln also regretted slipping through Baltimore, writing to a friend that he "did not then, nor do I now believe I should have been assassinated had I gone through Baltimore..."

In his biography of Lincoln, Ward Hill Lamon considered the plan to be part of Pinkerton's "political ambitions" and believed that the plan was fictitious. He argued that the list of subjects from Pinkerton lacked any influential individuals, even though Thomas Holliday Hicks, the Governor of Maryland, had called for Lincoln and his entourage to be killed by some "good men". Lamon had also reportedly offered Lincoln a revolver and bowie knife to defend himself, but Pinkerton had rejected the suggestion, and Lincoln declined Lamon's offer. It was also said that the plan increased "growing tension" in Maryland, which was already politically divided, with Baltimore remaining a divided city throughout the Civil War. In 1891, author L. E. Chittenden argued that there was no need for any precautions, such as a disguise, because Lincoln "entered the sleeping–car at Philadelphia, and slept until awakened within a few miles of Washington." That account contradicts other firsthand accounts, which state that Lincoln spent a sleepless and anxious night with Lamon and Pinkerton. George William Brown, then the mayor of Baltimore, wrote in his memoir of the event that he was not disloyal and described the plot as exaggerated, sensational, and imagined.

Harold Holzer, a Lincoln scholar, speaking to whether Lincoln's decision had been "unwise" or the plot authentic, said it was "hard to know" the reality, and added that if the plot existed, it was "at most ad hoc, poorly organized and probably destined to fail." Scholar Allen C. Guelzo called the plot an "interesting footnote" to the 1860 election and Lincoln's inauguration which was not worth additional attention, and argued that the plan gave Lincoln "the wrong lesson about his own safety". Lisa Mann of the White House Historical Association said the severity and existence of the plot has been "disputed by historians and Lincoln's contemporaries alike," and stated that Pinkerton heavily relied on hearsay, whispers and rumors "to establish the facts of the Baltimore Plot case."

In contrast, Greg Tobin wrote in The New York Times in 2013 that Pinkerton helped Lincoln avoid a "cataclysm" that would have befallen him, had he not followed Pinkerton's plan. Writer Richard Brownwell claimed that Ferrandini and his co-conspirators were "angered at being cheated out of their chance to kill Lincoln."

== In popular culture ==
In 1951, Metro-Goldwyn-Mayer (MGM) released a fictional re-creation of the alleged plot against Lincoln entitled The Tall Target. Its story generally follows what is known about the Baltimore Plot, with some differences. It is a New York Police Department detective named John Kennedy, played by Dick Powell, who contacts the administration about the conspiracy and boards the train hoping to discover whether any of the plotters are on board before they reach Baltimore.

There actually was an NYPD officer, John Alexander Kennedy, who claimed to have been the one to uncover the Baltimore Plot, but unlike Powell's movie character, he was not actually on the scene. Moreover, Kennedy was in reality the superintendent of the entire force. In the film, he is simply a detective sergeant.

"The Death Trap," an episode of the 1966–1967 television series The Time Tunnel, includes the 1861 Baltimore plot. The episode depicts a bomb being used in the 1861 Baltimore plot and has the attempt being plotted by Abolitionists, who hope to plunge the nation into a war in which slavery will be ended; the plotters are apparent sympathizers with John Brown, who had already been hanged. In reality, the American Civil War actually began in April 1861, with the attack on Fort Sumter. The episode was criticized by author Mark S. Reinhart as historically inaccurate, "too ridiculous" even for Time Tunnel, a set which looks more like a town in the Wild West than Baltimore, and "tedious viewing" for Lincolnphiles.

The popular YouTube series Puppet History has an episode which describes a simplified version of the Baltimore Plot. The episode, entitled "How America's First Female Detective Saved Abe Lincoln," mainly focuses on Kate Warne, and how she aided in saving the life of the president elect. There is also a graphic novel focusing on Kate Warne and the Pinkerton's role by Jeff Jensen entitled Better Angels: A Kate Warne Adventure.

The possibility of supposed Baltimore conspirator Cipriano Ferrandini having met Lincoln assassin John Wilkes Booth is the basis of the 2009 opera The Moustache, by Hollis Thoms. It included a scene where Ferrandini "talks about a speech given by Lincoln prior to his inauguration in 1861," which Pinkerton's operatives had listened to.

== See also ==
- American Civil War spies
- Assassination of Abraham Lincoln
- 1861 Baltimore riot
- Charles Van Wyck
- List of United States presidential assassination attempts and plots
