= Carol Kisthardt =

American law enforcement official

Carol Kisthardt is an American military lawyer and senior investigator with the national Naval Criminal Investigation Service. Kisthardt was a leading presenter on the role of the NCIS at numerous law enforcement conferences. She was a lead investigator in the investigations of Carlos and Elsa Alvarez, two Florida International University professors accused of spying for Cuba. In 2006, she investigated three suicides at Guantanamo Bay detention camp.
