= Carlos Alvarez (professor) =

Cuban academic

Carlos M. Alvarez
- Born: 1944 (age 81–82); Cárdenas, Cuba
- Education: University of Florida
- Spouse: Elsa Alvarez

Carlos Manuel Alvarez (born 1944) is an associate professor of educational leadership and policy studies at Florida International University who, along with his second wife Elsa, was charged in January 2006 with treason. He was arrested in January 2006, and pleaded guilty to conspiracy. On February 27, 2007, he was sentenced to five years in prison.

Alvarez was born in Cárdenas, Cuba, and moved to the United States in 1961. He was granted citizenship in 1972, and has a PhD in clinical psychology from the University of Florida.

== See also ==
- Carol Kisthardt
