= Elsa Alvarez =

Cuban spy

Elsa Alvarez (born 1950), along with her husband Carlos Alvarez, is accused of spying on Cuban exile groups in the United States on behalf of the Cuban government.

Elsa Alvarez was born in Cuba, and gained United States citizenship in 1979. She married Carlos Alvarez the following year, and later took up a position at the Florida International University, where he worked. In January 2006, both were arrested for passing information to the Cuban General Intelligence Directorate and charged with being a covert agent of the Republic of Cuba operating within the United States, in violation of Title 18, United States Code, Sections 951(a). It was alleged that she had been spying independently of her husband before they met, but her lawyers claim that she opposed her husband's work, and tried to persuade him to stop. She was released on bail before the trial (unlike her husband), with a District Court judge describing the case against her as "not very strong."

Elsa Alvarez entered a guilty plea December 18, 2006 and was later sentenced to 3 years in jail. Elsa Alvarez ceased to practice psychology and relinquished her license on October 22, 2007, and agreed to never again apply in Florida under Chapter 491.

No verifiable reference was found for Elsa Alvarez's current status.

== See also ==
- Carol Kisthardt
