= Timothy Webster =

American civil war spy

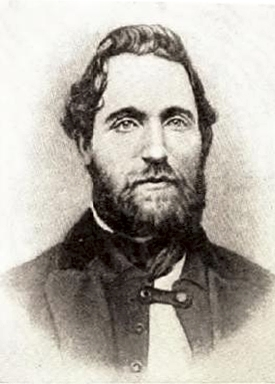
- 1910 sketch of Webster
- Born: March 12, 1822; Newhaven, East Sussex, United Kingdom
- Died: April 29, 1862 (aged 40); Richmond, Virginia
- Cause of death: Execution by hanging
- Spouse: Charlotte Sprowles (m. 1841)

Timothy Webster (March 12, 1822 – April 29, 1862) was a British-born American lawman and soldier. He served as a Pinkerton agent and Union spy, and was the first spy in the American Civil War to be executed.

== Early life ==
Webster came to America with his parents in August 1830 and settled in Princeton, New Jersey. He became a policeman in New York City sometime before 1850. He met Allan Pinkerton in 1853 and took a job with Pinkerton's private detective agency in 1856.

Webster married Charlotte Sprowles on October 23, 1841 in Princeton, New Jersey and the couple had four children, two of whom died young. Their son, Timothy Jr., born in 1843, joined the Union Army from Onarga, Illinois on July 30, 1862 and was wounded in the Battle of Brices Crossroads near Ripley, Mississippi on June 11, 1864, and taken to a Confederate prison in Mobile, Alabama where his leg was amputated. He subsequently died there on July 4, 1864. His body was transported north to Onarga, Illinois and buried in the Onarga Cemetery next to his grandfather, Timothy Webster Sr., who died in Onarga in 1860.

== Civil War ==
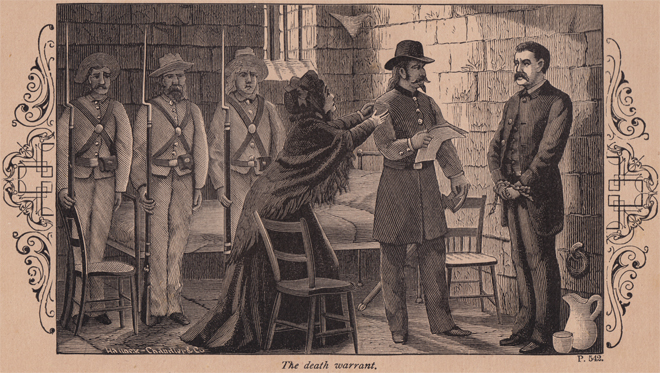
Timothy Webster, with fellow Union, Pinkerton agent, Hattie Lawton, before his execution by hanging, in Richmond, Virginia, for wartime espionage, from the 1882 book The Spy of the Rebellion: Being a True History of the Spy System of the United States Army During the Late Rebellion..., by Allan Pinkerton

In early 1861, Pinkerton sent Webster and Hattie Lawton to pose as a Southern gentleman and wife (Mrs. Webster) in the Baltimore area and became a member of a pro-Southern group in order to report on secessionists' plans and activities. Some of the information provided by Webster gave support to Pinkerton's assertion that there was a Baltimore Plot to assassinate Lincoln as he moved through Baltimore on his way to his inauguration in 1861.

After the outbreak of war, Pinkerton began to provide agents to the Union armies under George B. McClellan. Webster continued to gather information on the Confederacy from 1861 through 1862 in southern Maryland and Richmond, Virginia. In Richmond in 1862 he was stricken with inflammatory rheumatism and was too ill to send reports back to Pinkerton. As a result, Pinkerton sent Pryce Lewis and John Scully to locate Webster. The two men were recognized as being Union spies and captured by the Confederacy. Scully eventually revealed information that caused Webster and Lawton to be arrested.

Confederate officers had trusted Webster many times with valuable documents and information and the Confederacy was extremely embarrassed by Webster's betrayal. While Lewis and Scully were eventually released, Webster was arrested, tried, and sentenced to death by hanging. Hattie Lawton was imprisoned and later released in an exchange of prisoners.

== Death ==
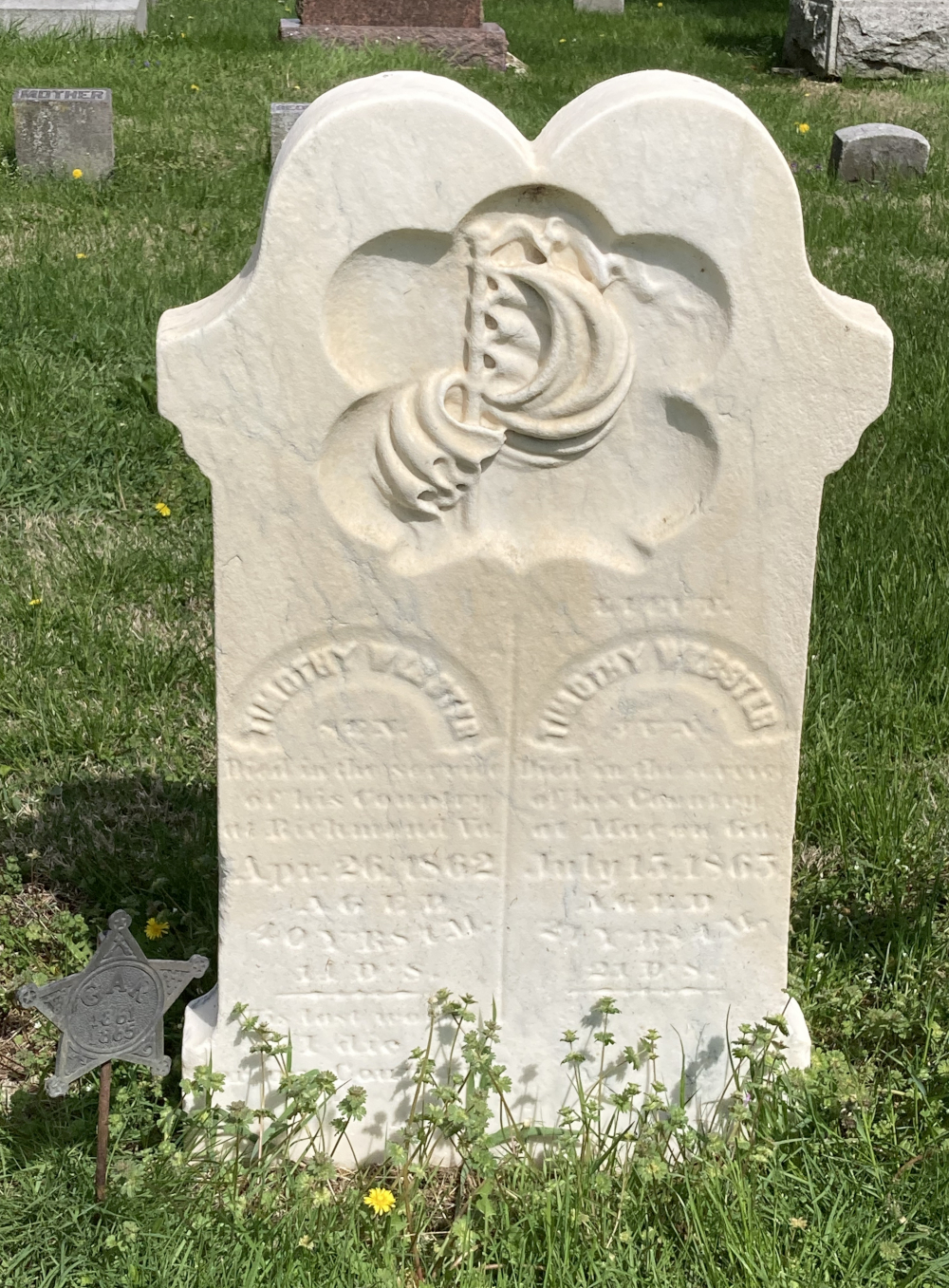
Webster's grave at Onarga Cemetery

When Pinkerton heard the news of the sentence, he and President Lincoln sent a message to the Confederacy threatening that if Webster was put to death, the Union would reciprocate by hanging a Confederate spy. Union policy had been to keep Confederate spies in jail and exchange them for Union prisoners.

The Confederacy ignored the threat and on April 29, 1862, Timothy Webster climbed the gallows in Richmond, Virginia at Camp Lee. After the initial attempt to hang Webster failed, he was helped to the gallows again and was heard to say, "I suffer a double death!" before being killed on the second attempt. He was buried in Richmond, but in 1871, Pinkerton sent George Bangs and Thomas G. Robinson (Timothy's son-in-law) to Richmond to locate his body and bring it to Onarga, Illinois for burial. He was buried next to his father, Timothy Webster Sr., and his son, Timothy Webster III.

== See also ==
- American Civil War spies
- Hattie Lawton
- Kate Warne
