= Elizabeth Carraway Howland =

Confederate spy during the American Civil War

Elizabeth Carraway Howland (November 20, 1816 – July 11, 1886; also Harland or Holland) was a Confederate spy during the American Civil War.

Union soldiers captured her town of New Bern, North Carolina. She made useful medicine for captured Confederate soldiers and helped Confederates smuggle food.
