= Kate Warne =

First female detective in the US (1833–1868)

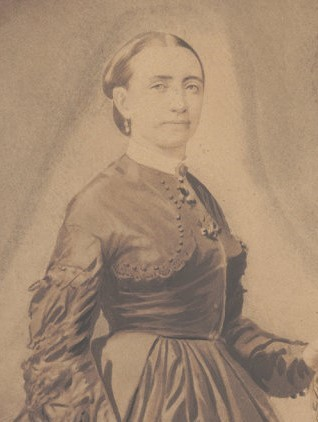
- Warne in 1866
- Born: August 28, 1833; Erin, New York, U.S.
- Died: January 28, 1868 (aged 34–35); Chicago, Illinois, U.S.
- Resting place: Graceland Cemetery, Chicago, Illinois
- Occupations: Detective, spy, female superintendent of detectives, supervisor of women agents
- Known for: First female detective in the Pinkerton Detective Agency, and the first female detective in the United States, responsible for uncovering the 1861 Baltimore Plot to assassinate president-elect Abraham Lincoln

Kate Warne (August 28, 1833 – January 28, 1868) was an American law enforcement officer best known as the first female detective in the United States, for the Pinkerton National Detective Agency. She also had a role in uncovering the 1861 Baltimore Plot against President-elect Abraham Lincoln, recruiting female agents for the Pinkerton Agency, and conducting intelligence work for the Union during the American Civil War.

== Pre–Civil War ==
=== Early detective work: 1856–1861 ===
Very little is known about Kate Warne prior to her working for Allan Pinkerton, except that she was born in Erin, Chemung County, New York and was a widow by age 23. An obituary following her death described her parents as "honest and industrious people" and stated that they were poor, resulting in her taking over many of the household duties. Pinkerton, in his book The Spy of the Rebellion (1883), described her as a commanding person, with "clear cut, expressive features" and called her a "slender, brown-haired woman, graceful in her movements and self-possessed." He added that her features, "although not what could be called handsome [beautiful], were decidedly of an intellectual cast" and said that her face was "honest."

In 1856, at the age of 23, Warne walked into the Pinkerton Detective Agency in response to an advertisement in a local newspaper, and requested a job as a detective. Pinkerton was initially hesitant to hire her. However, Warne convinced him that her undercover skills would be helpful. Pinkerton company records reported Pinkerton as declaring "It is not the custom to employ women detectives!" and noted that Warne argued her point of view, adding that "women have an eye for detail and are excellent observers."

Warne's arguments swayed Pinkerton, who employed her as his first female detective. Pinkerton soon had a chance to put Warne to the test. In 1858, Warne was involved in the case of Adams Express Company embezzlements, where she was successfully able to bring herself into the confidence of the wife of the prime suspect, Mr. Maroney. She thereby acquired valuable evidence, leading to the husband's conviction. Mr. Maroney was an expressman living in Montgomery, Alabama. The Maroneys stole $50,000 from the Adams Express Company. With Warne's help, $39,515 was returned. Mr. Maroney was convicted and sentenced to ten years in Montgomery, Alabama. In 1860, Allan Pinkerton put Warne in charge of his new Female Detective Bureau, which was based in Chicago, Illinois. For the Bureau, she recruited women such as Elizabeth H. Baker and Hattie Lawton to be agents.

== The Baltimore Plot ==
In 1861, Allan Pinkerton was hired by Samuel H. Felton, president of the Philadelphia, Wilmington and Baltimore Railroad, to investigate secessionist activity and threats of damage to the railroad in Maryland. Pinkerton went to work placing agents at various points in Maryland to investigate this potential activity. As the investigation proceeded, Pinkerton became aware that the activity in Maryland did not just end with the railroad; it also included the president-elect, Abraham Lincoln. Pinkerton received permission to continue his investigation and focus on the possible assassination plot. Warne was one of five agents sent to Baltimore, Maryland, on February 3, 1861, to investigate the hotbed of secessionist activity.

During the investigation, evidence unveiled a plot to assassinate Lincoln on his way to take office. Under the aliases Mrs. Cherry and Mrs. M. Barley (M.B.), Warne tracked suspicious movement among the Baltimore secessionists. It was in part through her undercover work in the guise of a wealthy Southern lady visiting Baltimore "with a thick southern accent", allowing her to infiltrate secessionist social gatherings in the Baltimore area. This included the classy Barnum Hotel, also known as Barnum's City Hotel, allowing her to verify a plot to assassinate Lincoln and develop details of how the assassination was going to occur. Pinkerton had agents across Maryland, but it was Warne specifically who supplied many of the key details that led Pinkerton to believe that the plot was imminent. Warne had befriended secessionists in Maryland and collected many details about the plot to assassinate Lincoln.

The president-elect, Abraham Lincoln, was traveling from his home in Springfield, Illinois, to the capital via a train tour that was to stop at notable cities along the way. His published program showed that Lincoln's last leg of the journey was from Harrisburg, Pennsylvania, to Washington, D.C. Due to the configuration of the rail system, all southbound trains required a transfer to be made in Baltimore. The tracks from points north ended at Calvert Street and the tracks heading south started at Camden Street (now the Camden Yards station). The distance between these two stations was about a mile by carriage ride. The secessionist plot was said to be that when Lincoln was passing through part of Calvert St. Station, a row or fight would occur, resulting in police officers rushing out, leaving Lincoln "entirely unprotected and at the mercy of a mob of Secessionists" that would then surround him. It was further alleged that a small steamship had been chartered, sitting in a nearby river, on which the murderers would flee, and travel immediately to the state of Virginia.

After seeing the pieces of the plot coming together, Pinkerton directed Kate Warne to take the 5:10 evening train to New York City on the morning of February 18. Once there, she was to set up a meeting with Norman B. Judd and give him a letter from Pinkerton outlining the known details of the assassination attempt. After receiving the details of the Baltimore Plot from Warne, Judd set up a meeting between himself, Pinkerton, and Lincoln on February 21. At this meeting, Lincoln was doubtful of the existence of an assassination plot or that if such a plot existed that it should be taken seriously.

However, a second independent source confirmed the plot by way of Frederick W. Seward, son of William H. Seward, the secretary of state–designate. From this point, Lincoln agreed that the assassination plot was plausible enough to take action. Lincoln decided to avoid hazard where it was not necessary; however, he refused to cancel any of his scheduled plans in Harrisburg, Pennsylvania. His agenda included: giving three speeches, raising of the American flag at Independence Hall in Philadelphia, and attending a high-profile dinner.

Train arrangements were made accordingly that allowed Lincoln to fulfill his scheduled duties in Harrisburg. It was not until 5:45 at night that there was any deviation from his schedule. John George Nicolay, Lincoln's private secretary, interrupted the dinner party to excuse the president-elect. Lincoln then changed into a traveling suit and a soft felt cap. He carried a shawl upon one arm to play the role of an invalid. Pinkerton, meanwhile, had the telegraph lines interrupted to prevent any knowledge of the deviation in Lincoln's schedule. At the station, Warne entered the sleeping car through the rear along with Pinkerton, Ward Hill Lamon, and a still-disguised Lincoln. She greeted Lincoln loudly as she would have a true brother.

Goggles carried by Lincoln's bodyguards during his train ride through Baltimore

From Harrisburg, Abraham Lincoln rode to Philadelphia by a special Pennsylvania Railroad train. From Philadelphia he went to Baltimore by a special Philadelphia, Wilmington, and Baltimore train on the night of February 22–23. It is said that Kate Warne did not sleep a wink on the overnight trip from Pennsylvania to Washington D.C. The disguises provided by Warne that night enabled Lincoln to make it through Baltimore without recognition and take his seat in the White House. It is believed that Pinkerton came up with the slogan to his agency "we never sleep" as a result of Warne's guard of Lincoln that night. Warne was key in the foiled Baltimore assassination plot – not only did she help uncover its details, but she also carried out most of the arrangements to smuggle Lincoln into Washington. She couriered secret information and set up meetings as well as securing the necessary four berths on a train leaving Philadelphia under the pretext that these berths were for her sick brother and family members. The train pulled out shortly before 11 p.m. and arrived in Baltimore about 3:30 a.m. on February 23. Warne remained in Baltimore as the sleeping cars with Lincoln on board were shifted to another train, which arrived in Washington around 6 a.m.

As such, it has been stated that Warne was instrumental not only in Lincoln's safe passage to take the oath of office but in convincing Pinkerton that there was a plot to assassinate Lincoln in Baltimore.

== Civil War: Intelligence work for the Union, 1861–1865 ==
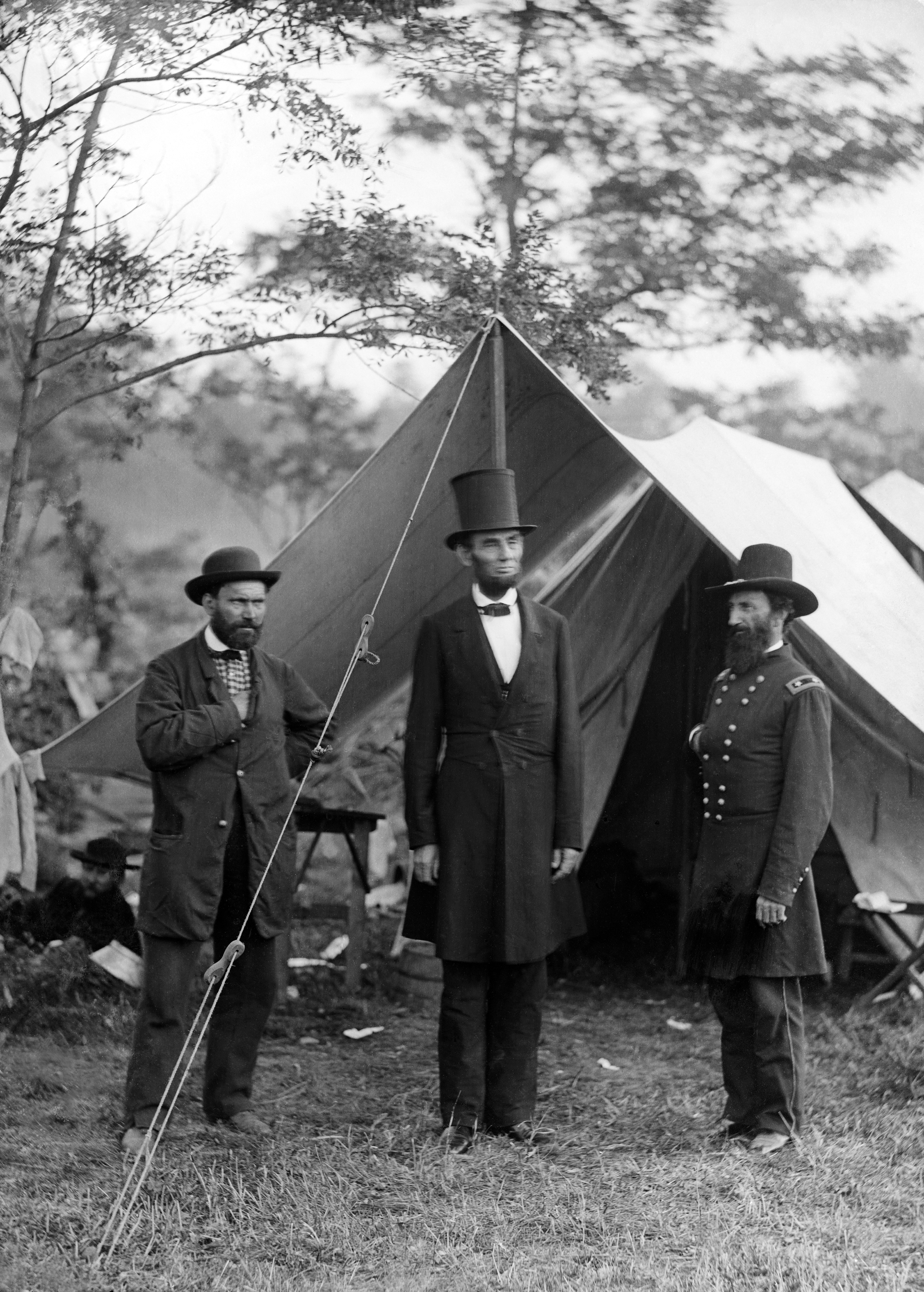
During the American Civil War Kate Warne traveled with her boss, Allan Pinkerton, to meet with General George B. McClellan's Ohio Division. This photo shows Pinkerton and President Lincoln at the Battle of Antietam in 1862.

After the quelled assassination attempt on president-elect Abraham Lincoln, Kate Warne continued to travel with Allan Pinkerton as his Female Superintendent of Detectives. On April 12, 1861, the Confederate States of America's cannons in Charleston began firing on Fort Sumter. These cannon shells marked the beginning of the American Civil War. Within nine days, Pinkerton wrote to President Lincoln offering the services of the Pinkerton National Detective Agency. However, before Lincoln could respond, Major General George B. McClellan asked Pinkerton to set up a military intelligence service for McClellan's command. Therefore, by the end of July 1861, Pinkerton took Warne, Timothy Webster, and later George Bangs west to set up a headquarters in Cincinnati, Ohio, to follow McClellan's Ohio division (see also Cincinnati in the Civil War).

During the Civil War, Allan Pinkerton and Kate Warne were used as a covert war intelligence-gathering bureau. Warne could easily penetrate into Southern social gatherings. She said that women are most useful in worming out secrets in many places which would be impossible for a male detective. Believed to be a mistress of Pinkerton, Warne would often pose as his wife while undercover. She also had an assortment of alias names: Kay Warne, Kay Waren, Kay Warren, Kate Waren, Kate Warren, Kitty Warne, Kitty Waren, Kitty Warren, Kittie Waren, Kittie Warne, and Kittie Warren. Warne was known as "Kitty" to Robert Pinkerton, Allan's brother. Robert Pinkerton often argued with Warne over expenses turned over to the agency, but her relationship with Allan continued for years. It was also rumored that the close working relationship between Allan and Warne was intimate.

== Post-Civil War: Continued espionage, 1865–1867 ==
After the Civil War, Kate Warne worked on various high-profile cases. One of these involved the murder of a bank-teller, George Gordon. The murderer got away with $130,000. Pinkerton determined that Gordon was fetching money for a friend or someone who frequented the bank when he was struck on the head behind the ear with a hammer with intent to murder any witnesses of the robbery. Through his investigation, Pinkerton felt certain that his prime suspect, Alexander P. Drysdale, had in fact killed Gordon. However, at this point he did not have enough hard evidence to convict Drysdale; too much was still based on speculation. Therefore, he set a trap for Drysdale so that he would reveal a confession. Warne was sent undercover as a Mrs. Potter and became close friends with Mr. Drysdale's wife. Through this plot, they were able to uncover where Drysdale had hidden the stolen money.

Another case for which Kate Warne went undercover was brought about by a Captain Sumner, who was convinced that both his sister, Mrs. Annie Thayer, and a Mr. Pattmore, were attempting to poison Mrs. Pattmore and himself. Warne took the name Lucille and assumed the role of a fortune teller to lure information out of the suspected murderer's confidants. In the meantime, she also continually coordinated Pinkerton's other female detectives in the agency. Pinkerton rented a space for Warne to work as part of her guise. Allan Pinkerton named Kate Warne one of the five best detectives that he had. Her employment by Pinkerton was a significant moment in Women's History. Women were not allowed to be a part of the police force until 1891 and could not be officers until 1908.

Pinkerton specifically thanked Kate Warne and Timothy Webster in his memoirs. Both Warne and Webster were key operatives during the Baltimore Plot investigations. Warne reported back to Pinkerton about all her work when he was away from the office and they worked together, on numerous cases, during their tenure. Pinkerton constantly showed a deep trust in the work that Warne performed and acknowledges so in his memoirs. She was in charge of the Female Detective Bureau established by Pinkerton, her title being Supervisor of Women Agents. Pinkerton said to his female prospective agents that they would serve their children "better than on the field," and added he had "several female operatives," supporting his case by noting, "if you agree to come aboard you will go in training with the head of my female detectives, Kate Warne. She has never let me down.

Since the Great Chicago Fire of 1871 destroyed many of the unpublished records of Pinkerton detective agency, little of her life beyond Pinkerton's words, which detailed cases his agency solved is known. Erin Allen, who managed the Library of Congress blog, called Warne an "intriguing figure" and speculated that little documentation remains "because she was a good spy."

== Death and legacy ==
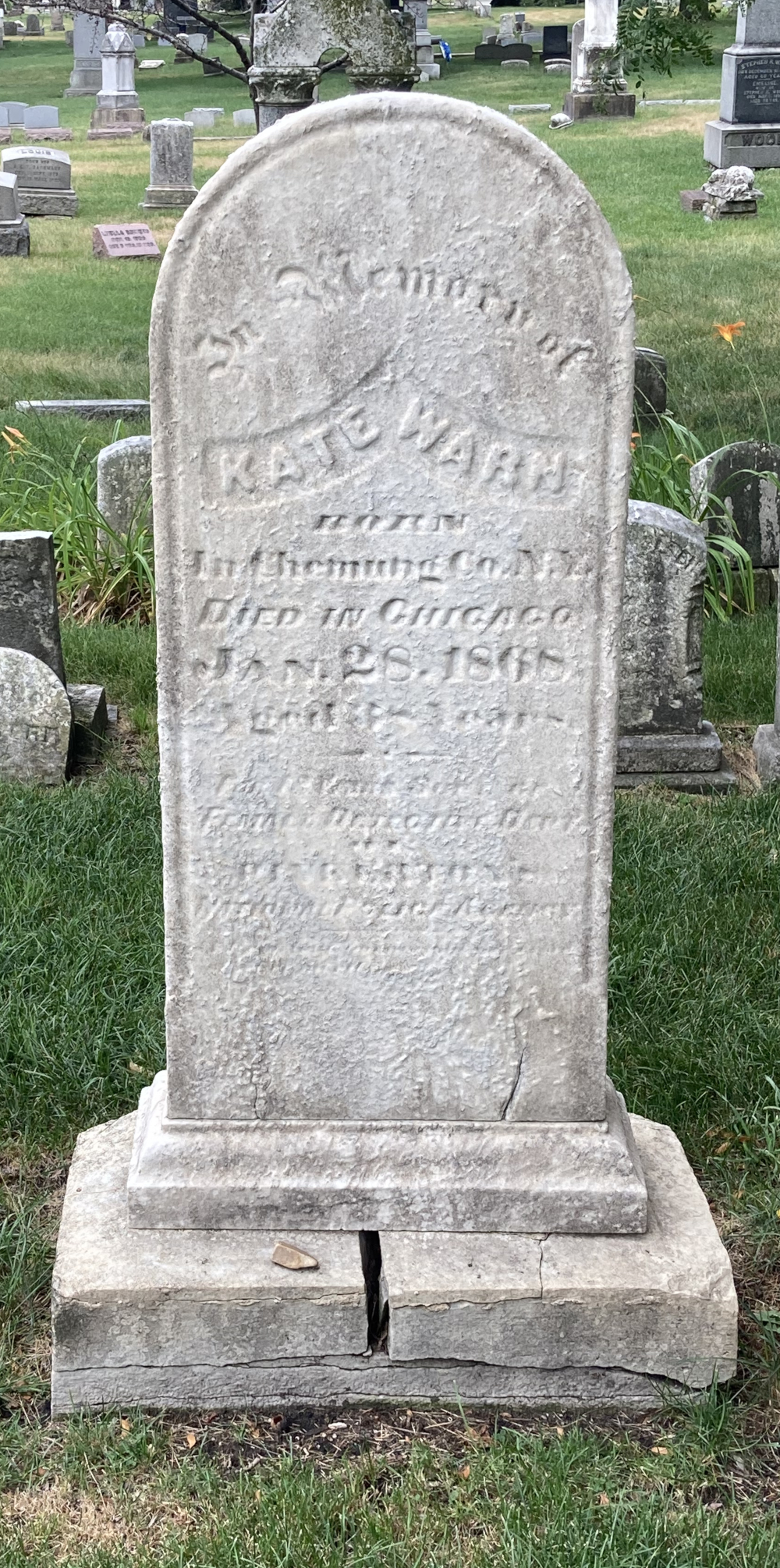
Warne's grave at Graceland Cemetery

Warne was buried, on January 28, 1868, in the Pinkerton family plot at Graceland Cemetery, Chicago, Illinois. Her gravestone is marked under the misspelled surname of "Warn", and states that she died of "congestion of the lungs." It was said that she died of pneumonia, and estimated at the age of 35 when she died.

Pinkerton wanted her burial plot to be undisturbed, so he took care of the issue in his will. Warne's burial plot could never be sold. An obituary in the Democratic Enquirer of McArthur, Ohio on March 19, 1868, described her as "marked woman amongst her sex" who had "great mental power" and was "an excellent judge of character" and called her the "best female detective in America, if not in the world." The Pinkerton detective agency later stated that she was "a source of inspiration" in the agency's history, and stated that the agency continued to carry on her legacy with female detectives working at the agency. Others have called Warne a trailblazer for those women who served as protectors of the United States President and in the United States Secret Service.

== In popular culture ==
Despite Warne's life story, she has rarely appeared in popular culture. In 2011, USA Network announced that a drama about Warne was being developed, but it "never materialized." Until 2013, a webcomic entitled Kate Warne, Pinkerton Detective, by Lauren R. Silberman, ran, and was described as "delightful" and "homespun".

In the 2014 Buffalo Gal Pictures TV series The Pinkertons, a fictionalized Kate Warne is played by Martha MacIsaac. She is portrayed by Natalie Robbie in the 2022 History Channel mini-series, Abraham Lincoln.

In 2015, Kate Hannigan published The Detective's Assistant, a historical fiction based on the cases of Kate Warne. In 2016, Elizabeth Van Steenwyk would publish a picture book about Warne's story. Greer Macallister's detective story and historical novel, Girl in Disguise, released in 2017, features Warne and tells her story. One reviewer called it a glimpse into a "19th century cloak and dagger world." Warne and the Pinkerton's role are the subject of a 2021 graphic novel by Jeff Jensen entitled Better Angels: A Kate Warne Adventure.

In August 2021, Amazon Studios acquired the distribution rights to an upcoming film produced by Seven Bucks Productions starring Emily Blunt as Warne. There have been no updates on this project since then, as noted by Collider in January 2023.

In 2025, Kate Warne was portrayed by Laura Martinez in the Xumo Play Original film Pinkerton.

== See also ==
- American Civil War spies
- Hattie Lawton
- Timothy Webster
- Allan Pinkerton
