= Pryce Lewis =

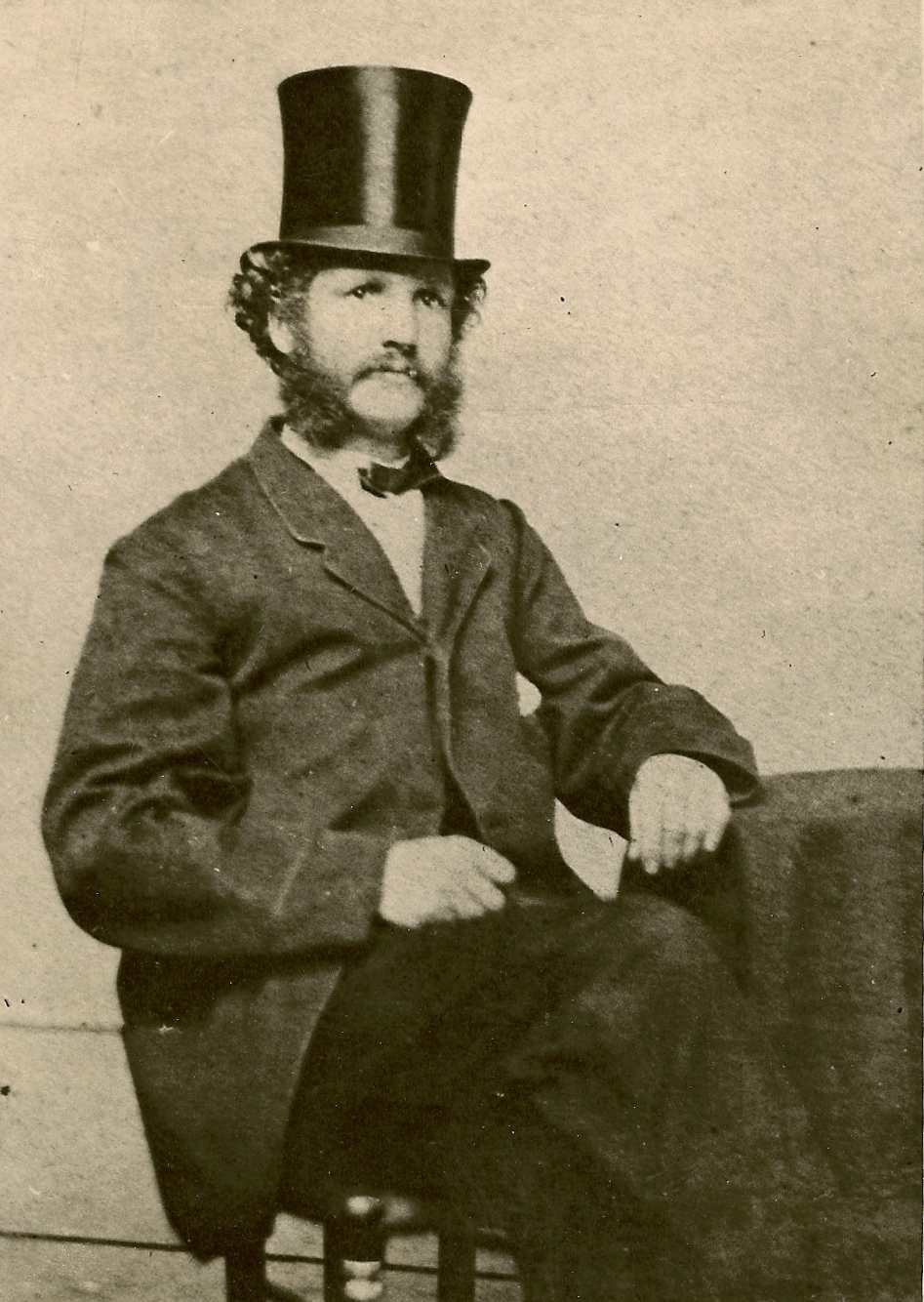
- Born: February 13, 1831; Newtown, Wales
- Died: December 6, 1911 (aged 80); New York City, New York, U.S.
- Other name: "Lord Tracy"
- Occupation: Spy
- Years active: 1860–1862

Pryce Lewis (February 13, 1831 – December 6, 1911) was an operative of the Pinkerton Detective Agency and Union spy during the American Civil War. His activities in Charleston, Virginia and the surrounding area heavily assisted the Union Army during the early years of the war. Lewis was later captured and played a part in the trial and execution of fellow agent Timothy Webster.

== Early life ==
Lewis was born in 1831 to a family of wool weavers living in Newtown, Wales. As a young man, Lewis had no interest in inheriting the family trade, and in May 1856 emigrated to the United States in search of a new life. After arriving in America, Lewis got a job as a traveling salesman for the London Printing and Publishing Company which he held for nearly two years until quitting it and moving to Chicago in the spring of 1859. After working there for almost a year as a grocery store clerk, Lewis grew restless again and began to make plans to head west as part of the Pike's Peak Gold Rush. A day before he was scheduled to leave Chicago, Lewis encountered an old friend of his who persuaded him to abandon his attempt at prospecting and instead apply for a position with Allan Pinkerton's growing detective agency. This friend arranged an interview with one of Pinkerton's employees, and Lewis began working for the organization in the spring of 1860.

== Pre-war work with the Pinkerton agency ==
After a brief period of training, Pinkerton assigned Lewis to several surveillance jobs throughout the northeastern United States, and in late 1860 invited him to assist in a more in-depth case in New York. The two men bonded over their shared European background and abolitionist sympathies, and in 1861 Pinkerton thought highly enough of Lewis to entrust him with investigating a murder in Jackson, Tennessee. The chief suspect was a respected citizen of the town, and Pinkerton instructed Lewis to travel to Jackson disguised as a "gentleman of leisure" and gain the suspect's trust to secure information that might assist in building a case against him.

Lewis remained in Jackson for five months, cultivating the appearance of an "English gentleman" which allowed him to earn the trust of secessionist locals who were more willing to talk to a foreigner than a suspected "Yankee." After several meetings with the chief suspect, Lewis determined that he was not guilty of the murder, discovering instead that a local horse thief had killed the victim. Lewis left the city on June 9, a day after the state of Tennessee voted to become the eleventh state to secede officially from the Union. Lewis made observations of the strength and number of Confederate troops he encountered during his return trip to Chicago, which he relayed to Pinkerton after relocating to the agency's new headquarters in Cincinnati.

== Mission to Charleston, West Virginia ==
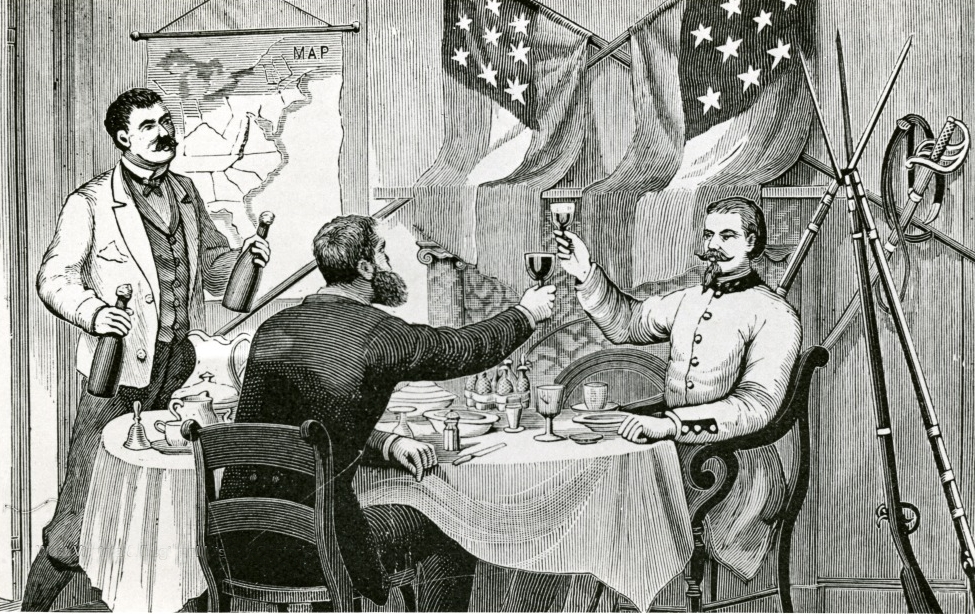
Pinkerton Spy Pryce Lewis at Supper with Confederate Captain

During Lewis' stay in Jackson, Pinkerton had begun gathering intelligence for General George McClellan of the Union Army. Upon his return to Cincinnati, Lewis was assigned to investigate the location and strength of rebel forces in Charleston, Virginia and the surrounding Kanawha Valley area. Lewis would reprise his role as an English noble touring the countryside, accompanied on his journey by Sam Bridgeman, a fellow Pinkerton operative who would pose as his manservant and carriage driver. The two agents set off from Cincinnati on June 27, 1861, traveling in a carriage well-stocked with food, expensive liquor, and a British Army chest strapped prominently to the exterior.

After a steamboat trip down the Ohio River and several days' journey along the James River and Kanawha Turnpike, Lewis and Bridgeman were stopped by Confederate soldiers under the command of Colonel George Patton. Lewis was taken to see the colonel at his camp in a nearby farmhouse. Patton received Lewis warmly after hearing his cover story and gave him a full tour of the encampment as well as a pass that would let Lewis continue to Charleston. After dinner and a night of champagne and cigars at the farmhouse, Lewis resumed his journey along the turnpike and arrived in Charleston on June 30.

Upon their arrival, Lewis and Bridgeman checked into the Kanawha House Hotel, the headquarters of General Henry Wise, commander of the Confederate forces in the region. Lewis approached Wise in the hope of receiving another pass that would allow the pair to leave Charleston if necessary, but the general refused, and Lewis was forced to write to George Moore, the British consul in Richmond, for permission to travel further. While he waited for Moore's response, Lewis continued to observe rebel movements in and around Charleston, including details of Wise's camp and fortifications at Twomile Creek.

On July 10, Wise was called away from Charleston in response to a Union advance near Parkersburg, leaving Colonel Christopher Tompkins in command. Lewis, who had become anxious to depart the city after several incidents in which a drunken Bridgeman confronted Confederate officers, asked the colonel for a travel pass in Wise's absence. Tompkins was not authorized to issue such documents, but he assured Lewis that mentioning the colonel's name would be enough to satisfy most Confederate troops. Lewis and Bridgeman left Charleston on July 12, 1861, and were able to make it back into Union territory after being stopped only once in the village of Logan Court House, Kentucky.

After returning to Cincinnati, Lewis relayed his information to General Jacob Cox. Acting on Lewis' knowledge of the quality of Wise's troops, Cox was able to overwhelm the rebel fortifications and capture Charleston on July 24.

== Counterespionage in Washington DC ==
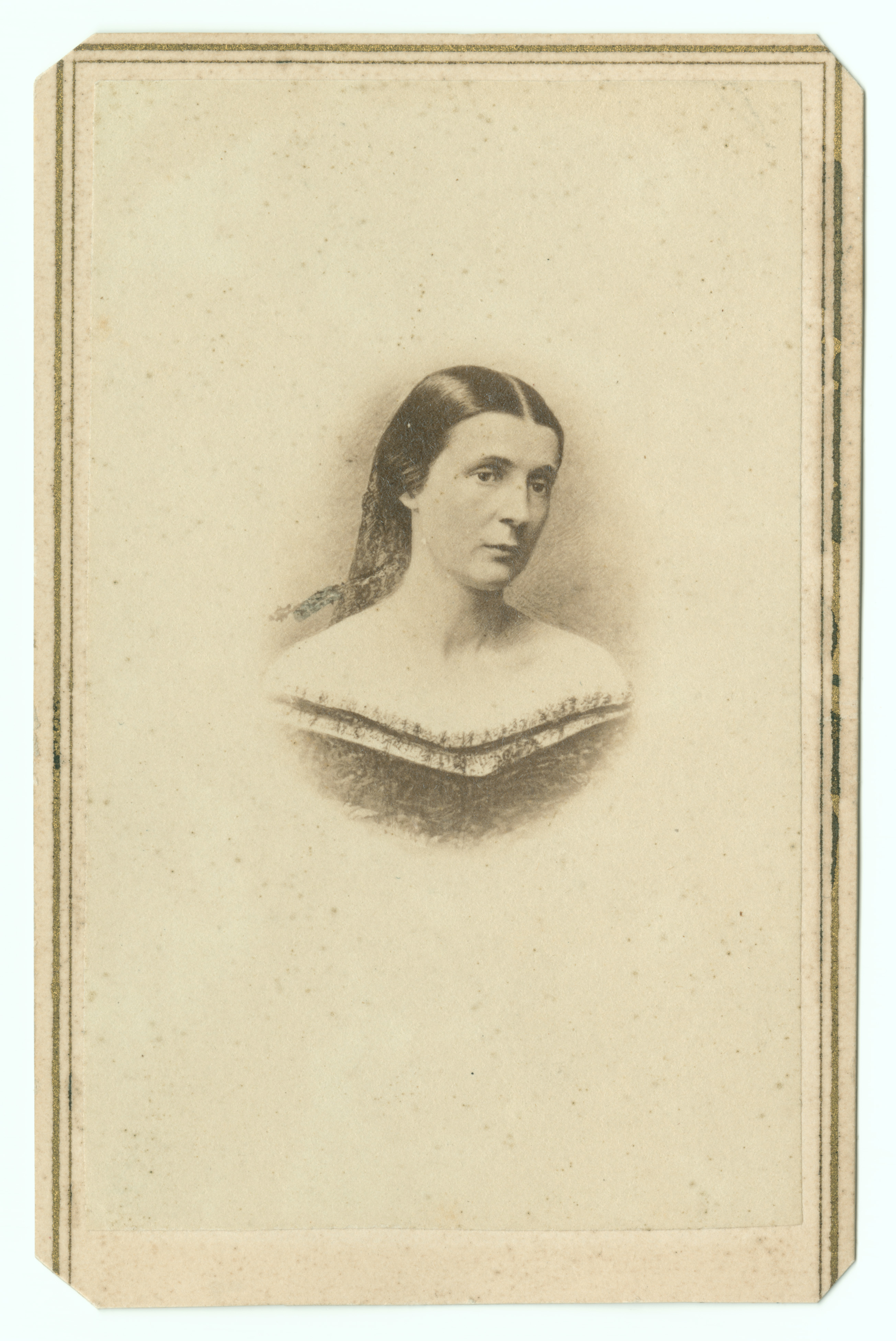
Lewis played a role in the capture of Confederate spy Rose Greenhow.

After their return from Charleston, Lewis and Bridgeman spent some time investigating secessionist activity in Baltimore, before being called to Washington DC to rendezvous with the recently relocated Pinkerton. Pinkerton had been forming a case against Confederate spy and local socialite Rose Greenhow, and on August 23, 1861, he raided Greenhow's house in the company of Lewis and several other agents. Lewis was responsible for keeping an eye on Greenhow during the search and at one point she attempted to threaten the detective with an uncocked revolver. After the discovery of multiple sources of incriminating information at her residence, Greenhow was put under house arrest, with Lewis remaining at the house as one of her guards. The day after Greenhow's arrest, Pinkerton agents detained the family of U.S. Representative Phillip Phillips on similar spying charges, and the women of the family, including Phillips' wife Eugenia, were relocated to the Greenhow residence and put under Lewis' guard for the remaining weeks Pinkerton had him stationed there.

Following the Greenhow incident, Lewis investigated other suspected rebel sympathizers in Washington including Elizabeth Morton, the wife of Florida Senator Jackson Morton.

== Capture ==
General John Winder, who orchestrated Lewis' capture in Richmond.

In February 1862, Pinkerton ordered Lewis to travel to Richmond, Virginia, to investigate the status of Timothy Webster and Hattie Lawton, two of Pinkerton's top agents who had ceased communication with the agency. Lewis raised serious objections to the mission, fearing that the number of deported Confederate sympathizers in the city that knew him to be a federal agent would pose a risk to his cover. Pinkerton assured him that the Morton and Phillips families would not be in Richmond during his time there, and Lewis ultimately agreed to the plan, mostly due to his respect and concern for Webster. Pinkerton partnered Lewis with fellow agent and Englishman John Scully for the mission, and the two left the capital on February 18.

Lewis and Scully arrived in Richmond on February 26 and were able to locate Webster and Lawton at the couple's room in the Monumental Hotel. Webster had been confined to his bed by an outbreak of rheumatism and was under close surveillance by members of Richmond's secret police, who had begun to suspect his true identity as a Northern double agent. When Lewis and Scully first entered Webster's room, they found him in the company of P.B. Price, one of Webster's Richmond contacts who still supposed him to be a loyal Confederate. Not wanting to blow Webster's cover, the two returned the following afternoon only to find Webster again with a Southern visitor, Captain Samuel McCubbin of the secret police. McCubbin had been dispatched by Provost Marshal General John Winder to observe Webster and was staying in the room directly opposite from his. After greeting Lewis and Scully, McCubbin explained that since they had crossed the Potomac into Confederate territory, both would have to report to Winder's headquarters as soon as possible.

During their meeting, Winder gave no indication of his suspicions that Lewis and Scully might also be Northern agents, and let the two leave after only asking a few questions about their opinions of the Confederacy and reasons for traveling to Richmond. However, after returning to Webster's room Lewis and Scully were intercepted by one of Winder's agents and Chase Morton, the son of the Morton family Lewis had investigated in Washington. Morton was able to confirm Lewis' identity, and the officer escorted the two men back to Winder's office where the general revealed that he had suspected Lewis all along and promptly arrested the two men on charges of espionage.

== Imprisonment ==
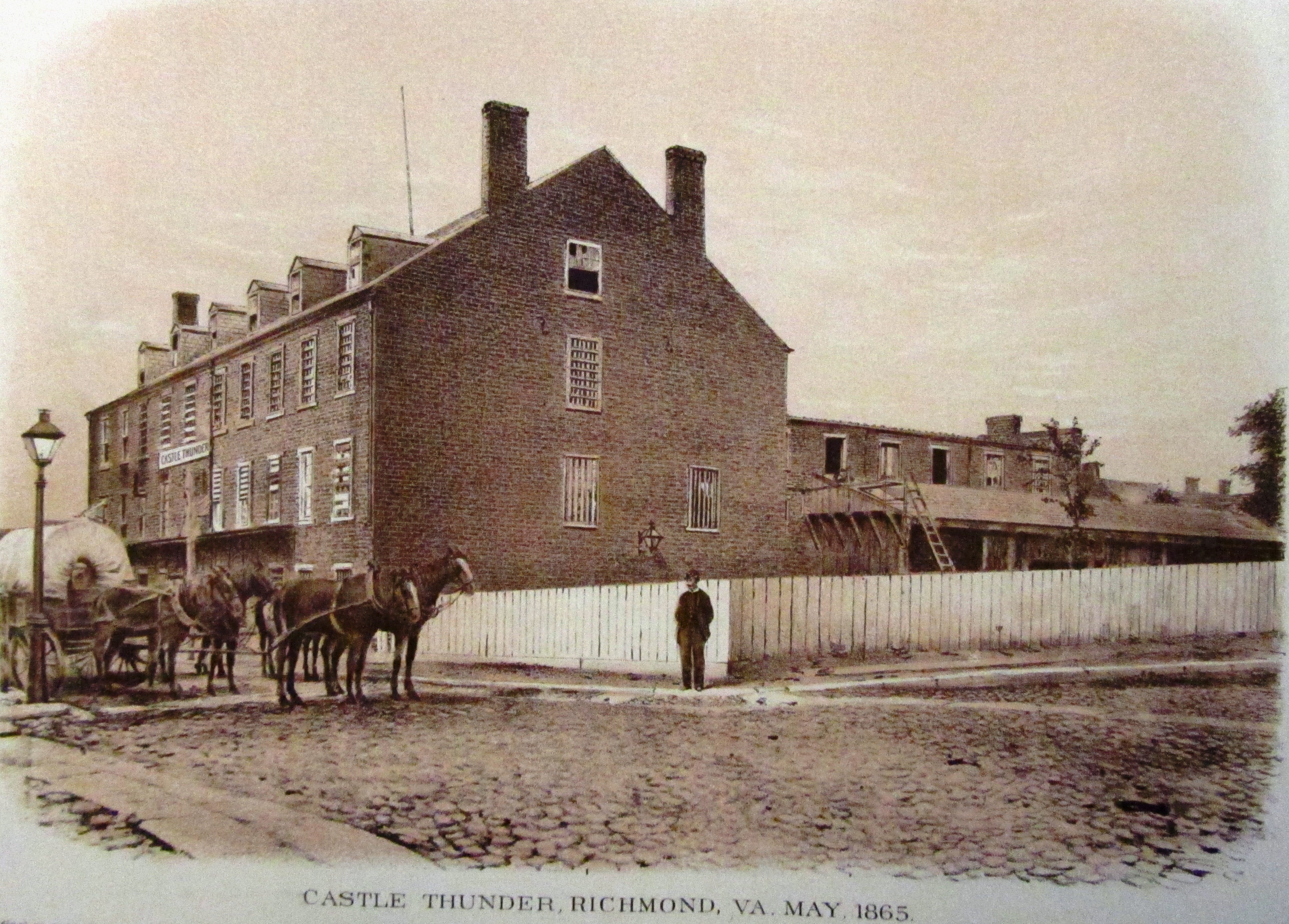
Castle Thunder, where Lewis was imprisoned from August 18, 1862, to September 28, 1863

Winder's men took Lewis and Scully to Henrico County Jail on February 28, and Scully was transferred to Castle Godwin the following day. Lewis remained at Henrico until he and several other inmates staged an escape attempt on March 16. Due to the jail's light security, the group was able to make it north of the Chickahominy River and almost reached the Northern army's front line before being recaptured by Confederate troops on March 19. Lewis was returned to Richmond and tried by court-martial, after which he joined Scully at Castle Godwin. On April 1, the two were notified that that court-martial had found them both guilty and that they would be hanged in three days.

Lewis was able to get a letter explaining their situation to Fredrick Cridland, the British Acting Consul in Richmond, who agreed to speak with the Southern officials in defense of the two British subjects. On April 3, Cridland arranged a meeting with the Confederate secretary of state Judah Benjamin and secretary of war George Randolph in which he argued that the condemned men had been convicted based on insufficient evidence. The secretaries agreed, and on the morning of April 4, hours before he was scheduled to die, Lewis received word that Benjamin had officially postponed his execution to April 12.

During the following week, Lewis was pressured by agents of Winder into making a confession that would incriminate Webster, who had been arrested by Winder's men on similar charges several days after Lewis and Scully's capture. Lewis initially refused but eventually gave in after fearing that Scully had already told the interrogators everything. On April 10, two days before his scheduled date of execution, Lewis met with Judge Advocate William Crump and confessed to him the circumstances of his employment to Pinkerton and the reasons for his trip to Richmond. Lewis made no mention of his previous activity in Charleston and Washington, and would later insist he told the Confederates no more than they already knew. Webster was tried on this information, and both Scully and Lewis made statements during the trial, although records of exactly what information they provided did not survive the war. Webster was executed on April 29, and guards returned the prisoners to Castle Godwin with their executions postponed indefinitely.

Lewis and Scully remained at Castle Godwin until August 18, 1862, when overcrowding necessitated their relocation to Castle Thunder, a newly built prison under the command of Assistant Provost Marshal Captain George Alexander. After currying favor with the captain and writing several letters to Pinkerton in Washington, Lewis and Scully were able to obtain their release in exchange for Confederate prisoners being held by the Union Army. The two were released on September 28, 1863, and arrived in Washington on September 30.

== Post-release activity and suicide ==
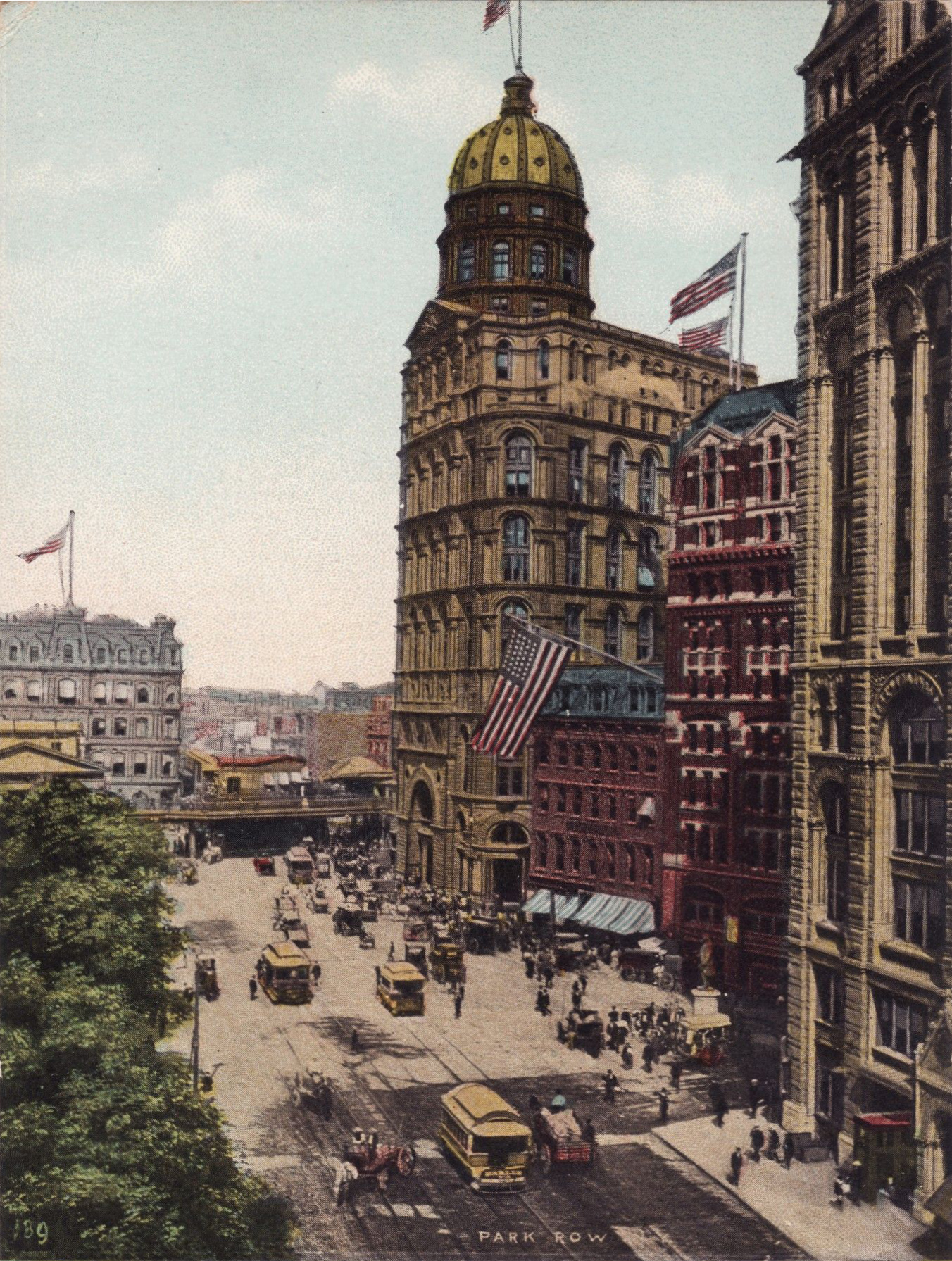
The New York World Building, from which Lewis jumped to his death on December 6, 1911

Lewis met with Pinkerton on October 2, resulting in a furious altercation that put an end to their professional relationship. Lewis blamed Pinkerton for his capture and incarceration and refused to accept responsibility for Webster's execution, saying that Pinkerton's poor judgment was the cause of the entire incident. Pinkerton, who had previously forgiven the agents for their involvement in Webster's capture, accused Lewis of treachery and incompetence. The two men never met face-to-face again.

Lewis returned to Washington and worked as a bailiff at Old Capitol Prison until June 1864, when Colonel Lafayette Baker accepted him back into his reorganized military secret service. Lewis worked for Baker until later that year, when he resigned after becoming disillusioned with the organization's corruption. He lived for a time with his brother in Connecticut and returned to Britain in 1865. Lewis returned to America in 1867, and on January 20, 1868, married Maria Thwaites, an acquaintance of the store owner he worked for in Chicago before meeting Pinkerton. In 1871 Maria gave birth to a daughter, Mary, and in 1878 a son, Arthur. The family later moved to New York City, where Lewis had opened up a detective agency of his own. The new organization was highly successful and came into the public eye in 1878 when it was involved in a dispute over the will of Alexander Stewart.

During this time Allan Pinkerton had been working to bring attention to the story of Timothy Webster and in 1884 published The Spy of the Rebellion, in which he presented an embellished account of his agency's activities during the war, including Lewis' trip to Charleston. Pinkerton included in his descriptions an entirely fictional incident in which Lewis became romantically involved with the daughter of a Virginia judge, and an unflattering account of Lewis' confession at the hands of rebel authorities. Lewis was outraged by his portrayal in the book and tried to contact Pinkerton with corrections, but the publication permanently damaged his reputation and his business suffered as a result. In 1888 Lewis began work on a memoir entitled Pryce Lewis: his adventures as a union spy during the war of the rebellion. A historical narrative. He hoped that the book would set the record straight, but no publisher was willing to accept his manuscript and Lewis eventually abandoned the project.

Maria Lewis died in 1901, and Arthur soon joined her in 1903 after living for only 24 years. Mary had moved out of the house and was working as a pottery teacher, leaving Lewis alone in New York. He made a living doing small jobs for friends and acquaintances but was unable to secure aid from the Bureau of Pensions in Washington on account of his foreign citizenship. On December 6, 1911, Lewis committed suicide by jumping from the observation deck of the New York World Building. He was buried in an unmarked grave at Center Cemetery in Torrington, Connecticut. In 2014, the Connecticut Civil War Round Table took up a collection for a grave marker, which residents erected on June 11, 2014.

== Bibliography ==
- Kane, Harnett T. (1954). Spies for the Blue and Gray. Garden City, NY, Hanover House. OCLC 00476276
- Markle, Donald E. (1994). Spies and Spymasters of the Civil War. New York, Hippocrene Books. ISBN 0-7818-0227-X
- Mortimer, Gavin (2010). Double Death: The True Story of Pryce Lewis, the Civil War's Most Daring Spy. New York, Walker Publishing Company. ISBN 978-0-8027-1769-6
- Pinkerton, Allan (1989). The Spy of the Rebellion. Lincoln, NE, University of Nebraska Press. ISBN 0-8032-8722-4
