= Theresa Squillacote =

South African spy

- Occupations: Former National Labor Relations Board attorney and spy for South Africa
- Spouse: Kurt Stand
- Status: Released
- Convictions: 1998 Conspiracy to deliver national defense information to a foreign government (18 U.S.C. § 794)
- Penalty: 22 years imprisonment

Theresa Squillacote was a former lawyer for the National Labor Relations Board, House Armed Services Committee, and Deputy Under Secretary of Defense who was convicted of spying for South Africa in 1998. She was sentenced to 22 years in prison. and was released in 2015.

== Espionage ==
Squillacote initiated contact with the anti-Apartheid leadership of South Africa to work as a spy. She would ultimately hand four classified documents to the FBI in a counterintelligence sting.

== Post-espionage career ==
After serving her sentence, Squillacote has worked in prisoner rights advocacy.

== See also ==
- Ana Montes
- Jonathan Pollard
