= George Curtis (Union spy) =

George Curtis was a resident of New York at the beginning of the Civil War and joined a New York infantry regiment. He then became a Pinkerton agent, and a Union spy.

He was selected in 1862 to obtain information from Richmond. He made his way to the Confederate capital as a contraband merchant selling gun caps, ammunition, and the much needed quinine. The day after reaching Virginia he was taken to the Confederate lines and to an audience with Major General A. P. Hill.

General Hill gave him a pass to go on to Richmond and also asked Curtis if he would carry some dispatches as well. Curtis gladly agreed to carry out his request. When Curtis reached Richmond he was introduced to Confederate Secretary of War Judah Benjamin where he negotiated for the delivery of his contraband goods and received a pass to move in and out of Richmond freely.

Throughout the war Curtis was asked to, and did, carry dispatches to Confederate General John B. Magruder. But before they reached General Magruder they were taken by Mr. Bangs, Pinkerton's supervisor for field agents. There they were copied before continuing on to General Magruder. Curtis was never suspected for a spy, he was never arrested. He worked as a contraband merchant for the duration of the war, never once was he suspected of carrying important information to the Union forces.
