= Hattie Lawton =

American detective

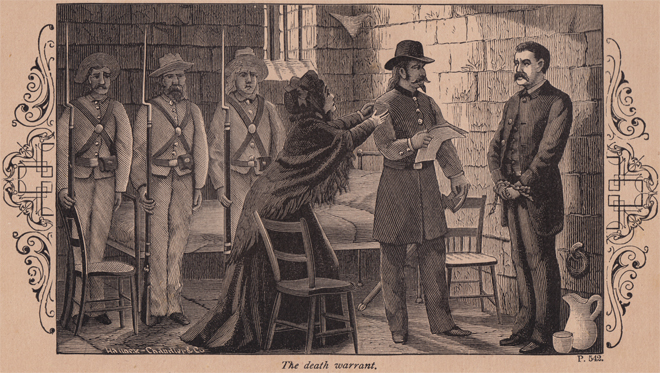
- Hattie Lawton with fellow, Union, Pinkerton agent, Timothy Webster, before his execution by hanging, in Richmond, Virginia, for wartime espionage, from the 1882 book, The Spy of the Rebellion: Being a True History of the Spy System of the United States Army During the Late Rebellion..., by Allan Pinkerton
- Born: c. 1837
- Died: (aged ?)
- Other names: Hattie H. Lawton, Hattie Lewis Lawton
- Occupations: detective, spy
- Known for: Female detective, in the Pinkerton Detective Agency's Female Detective Bureau and Union spy in the American Civil War

Hattie Lawton, also known as Hattie H. Lawton, Hattie Lewis, and Hattie Lewis Lawton was an American detective, who worked for Allan Pinkerton, of the Pinkerton Detective Agency. Lawton may have been born around 1837, although most details of her life, before and after the American Civil War, are unknown. "[Hattie] Lawton was part of Pinkerton's Female Detective Bureau, formed in 1860 to 'worm out secrets' by means unavailable to male detectives."

== Baltimore assassination plot against Abraham Lincoln ==
Hattie Lawton, along with fellow female Pinkerton detective Kate Warne, worked with other Pinkerton agents who actively participated in the detection of the 1861 Baltimore assassination plot against President-elect Abraham Lincoln. In order to remain undetected, she posed as the wife of Timothy Webster, another Pinkerton agent. It has also been said that she, and Warne, learned more about the assassination plots against Lincoln than the male detectives who were part of the same agency.

== American Civil War ==
During the American Civil War, Hattie Lawton continued to work with the Pinkerton Detective Agency. According to Pinkerton's account, in the early part of 1861, Lawton was stationed in Perryville, Maryland, with Timothy Webster. Lawton was recruited to the agency along with Elizabeth H. Baker, by Warne, who headed the agency's Female Detective Bureau, which was based in Chicago, Illinois.

After Pinkerton began his "Secret Service" for Gen. George B. McClellan, Lawton and Webster were added to the payroll of the Pinkerton's service in Washington on August 8, 1861. Lawton again posing as Timothy Webster's wife appeared in Richmond, Virginia, in the early part of 1862. The two were sent by Pinkerton to Richmond to gather intelligence about Confederate army movements.

=== Arrest and imprisonment ===
Hattie Lawton tended to Timothy Webster when he fell ill at the Monument Hotel in Richmond, which prevented intelligence reports from being sent back to Allan Pinkerton. John Scobell, an African American Union spy, worked with the "twenty-five-year-old beauty", Hattie Lawton, during this time, posing as her servant.

Allan Pinkerton sent two agents, Pryce Lewis and John Scully, to Richmond, Virginia, to find out what happened to Webster and Lawton. They found Webster and Lawton, but Lewis and Scully were recognized as Pinkerton agents, arrested and later released as part of a prisoner exchange on March 18, 1863. Various sources indicate that one or both of the men, either to save their own lives or after being tricked, revealed the identity of Webster. Webster and Lawton were arrested and after a quick trial both were found guilty.

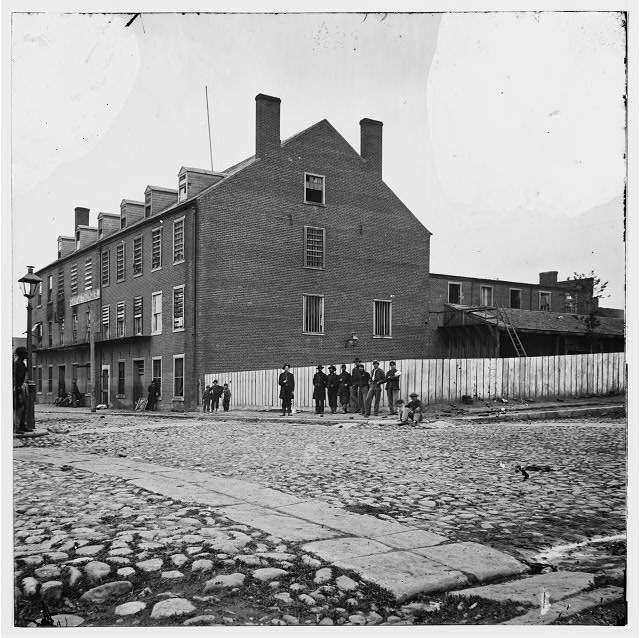
Castle Thunder Prison, Richmond, Virginia, 1865.

Timothy Webster was sentenced to death and executed by hanging, on April 29, 1862. Lawton was sentenced to one year in Castle Thunder prison in Richmond, Virginia. In Confederate records, Lawton was described as "Mrs. Timothy Webster", one of a party of four Federals, exchanged for Confederate spy Belle Boyd, on December 13, 1862.

During her imprisonment, Richmond's most accomplished Union spy, Elizabeth Van Lew, visited Hattie Lawton, but it is unclear whether Van Lew was aware of the real identity of "Mrs. Timothy Webster". Lawton also attempted to persuade Confederate officials of Webster's innocence, but was unsuccessful.

== Post-war years and death ==
Following her release from prison, nothing is known regarding Lawton's post-war years or death.

== See also ==
- American Civil War spies
- Kate Warne
- Timothy Webster
