= Lincoln assassination flags =

Flags which decorated the theatre box where Abraham Lincoln was shot

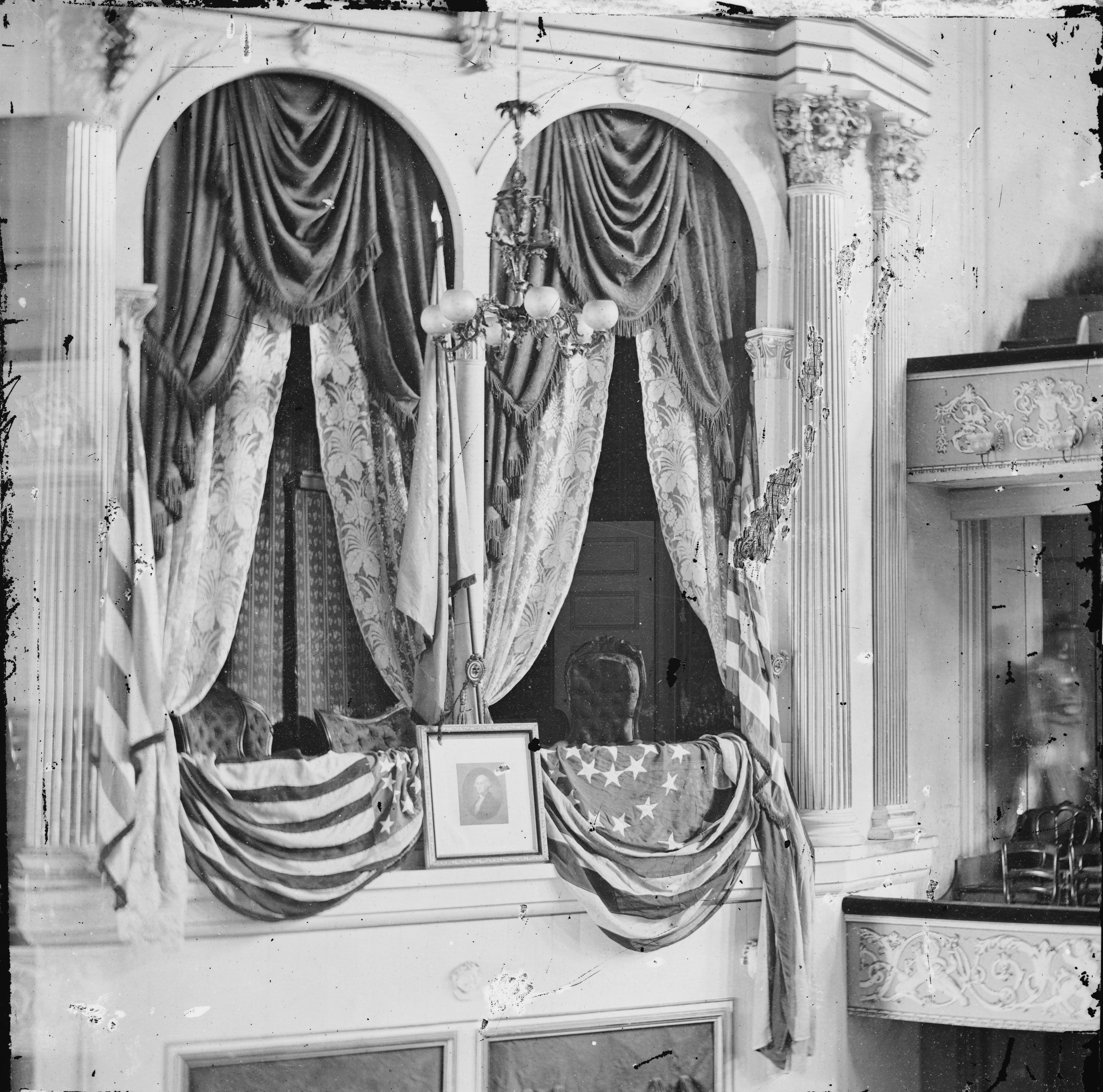
The presidential box at Ford's Theatre, adorned with the American and Treasury Guard flags, two days after Booth's shooting of Lincoln.

The Lincoln assassination flags were the five flags which decorated the presidential box of Ford's Theatre, and which were present during John Wilkes Booth's assassination of U.S. President Abraham Lincoln on April 14, 1865. Lincoln and his wife, Mary Todd Lincoln, were in this box watching a production of Our American Cousin when Booth shot the president. Booth's spur was said to have been caught by one of the flags when he jumped from the box and broke his leg; this part of the story, however, is disputed. Three of the flags were American flags and the other two were Treasury Guard flags. According to Civil War historians, three of these five original flags are currently accounted for.

== Treasury Guard flags ==
Hours before Lincoln's arrival at Ford's Theatre, theater owner, James R. Ford sent workers to find flags for the presidential box. The two Treasury Guard flags are from the United States Department of the Treasury, where they were returned the day after Lincoln's assassination. (All five flags were removed after Lincoln was shot to prevent "souvenir hunters" from stealing them.) After their return, the two Treasury Guard flags were displayed in parades honoring Civil War veterans and at the inauguration of President Andrew Johnson.

One of the Treasury Guard flags, which is on display at the Connecticut Museum of Culture and History in Hartford, Connecticut, contains thirteen alternating red and white stripes and a blue canton with an oil painted eagle and 35 stars. The canton contains the words "Presented to Treasury Guard Regt. by the Ladies of the Treasury Dept. 1864." Experts agree that this flag was positioned on a pole to the left of Lincoln in the presidential booth. The flag is six-feet-square and made of silk.

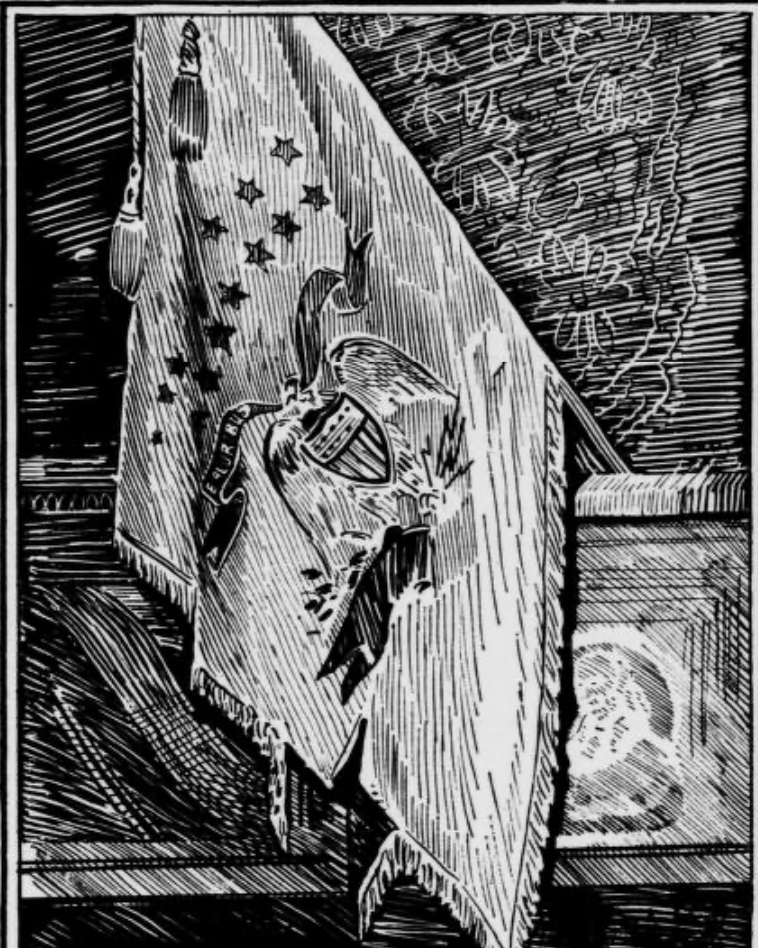
Treasury Guard regimental flag

The flag was placed in storage at the Treasury Department, until a former captain of the watch took the flag. It eventually ended up in the hands of a Civil War veteran in Hartford who passed it along to his son, Dr. Robert M. Yergason. Yergason donated the flag to the Connecticut Historical Society in 1922. The flag remained in a storage area with other Civil War artifacts for 76 years, until it was rediscovered by a former head librarian in 1998. The flag was then restored at the Textile Conservation Workshop in New York City.

After three years of researching, the Treasury Guard flag was deemed authentic by several prominent Civil War experts, including Harold Holzer, a vice president at the Metropolitan Museum of Art and author of 18 books on Abraham Lincoln and the Civil War and Howard Michael Madaus, chief curator of the National Civil War Museum in Harrisburg, Pennsylvania.

This flag is part of the Civil War Treasures exhibit at the Connecticut Museum of Culture and History and has been on display since 2001. It is behind glass and under a fine mesh to help preserve it.

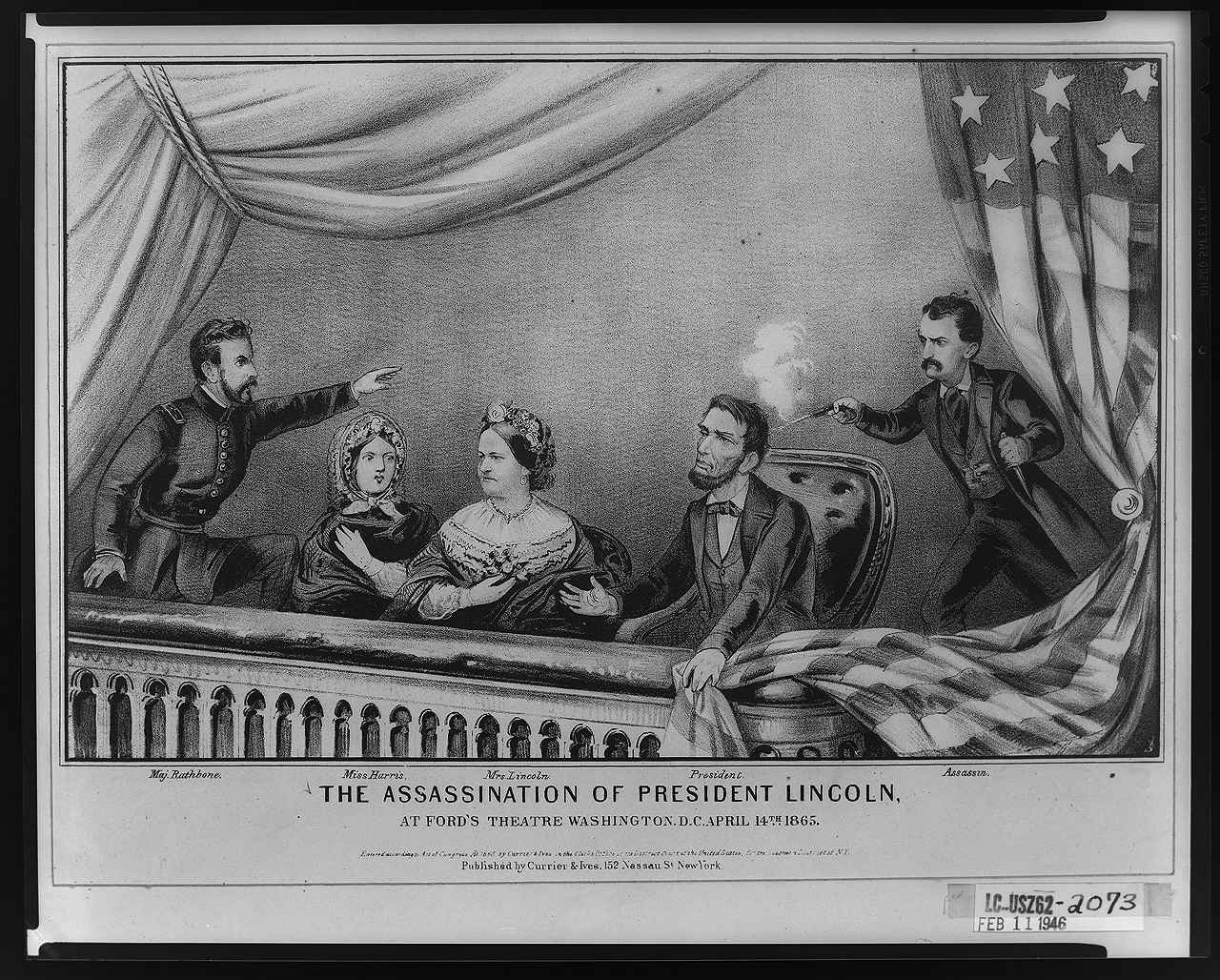
Assassination of Abraham Lincoln Currier & Ives illustration of Lincoln's assassination, showing Lincoln clutching a flag hung to his left.

While some accounts and period illustrations suggest that Lincoln may have grasped this flag when he was shot, or pushed the flag aside to watch the performance, these claims cannot be verified, though the proximity of the flag to Lincoln makes both scenarios possible. An illustration from Currier & Ives depicting the assassination, showed Lincoln clutching a flag to his left. This flag, which is shown with red and white stripes and a blue canton with stars could be the Treasury Guard flag or an American flag.

It has also been suggested that Booth may have caught his spur on the Treasury Guard flag while jumping from the box to the stage. It is widely debated which flag, if any, Booth tripped over in the jump, breaking his leg.

The second Treasury Guard flag was placed at the front of the presidential box at Ford's Theatre, the night of Lincoln's assassination. This flag, which is dark blue, features an eagle, 34 stars and a banner with the words "U.S. Treasury Guards" below the emblem. A shield with vertical red and white stripes and a blue chief covers the eagle's chest. This flag is silk and measures 71.5" x 77.5". It is displayed at Ford's Theatre National Historical Site in Washington, D.C. A tear in this flag has led many to believe that it is the flag Booth tripped over in the escape.

This Treasury flag was displayed at the Treasury Building after Lincoln's assassination. It was placed in a corridor outside the Secretary's suite. A reproduction of this flag, which even replicates the tear in the original, is still displayed there today.

== American flags ==
Of the three American flags displayed in the presidential booth the night of Lincoln's assassination, only one is accounted for. This flag, deemed the "Lincoln flag," is a 36-star flag used to cushion Lincoln's head after he was shot. It is kept at the Pike County Historical Society located at The Columns Museum in Milford, Pennsylvania. President of the Lincoln Group of New York, Joseph Garrera studied the Lincoln Flag independently for one year. In his research document, The Lincoln flag of the Pike County Historical Society, Garrera confirms his findings, declaring the Lincoln flag genuine.

The blood stains on the flag were tested twice, and both tests showed the stains were from human blood. The blood stains were contact stains, and in his forensic research, Garrera found them consistent with the type of stain that would occur in such a situation. He also tested the material used in manufacturing the flag, policies at that time on displaying the American flags in ceremonies and the disposition of all the flags at Ford's Theatre. All of Garrera's tests prove the flag is authentic.

In tracing the events of the night of Lincoln's assassination, Garrera found that Laura Keene, the star of that evening's performance of "Our American Cousin" pulled the flag to the floor and placed it partially under Lincoln's head, which she cradled in her lap. After Lincoln was moved across the street to the Petersen House, part-time stage manager Thomas Gourley took the flag from the booth. In the 1880s he gave it to his daughter, Jeannie Gourlay Struthers, who passed it along to her son V. Paul Struthers. In 1954 he donated the flag to the Pike County Historical Society with an unbroken oral history of the flag's ownership dating back to the day of Lincoln's assassination.

Nationally known Lincoln scholars like Michael Maione, Historian at Ford's Theatre; Dr. Wayne Temple, Director of the Illinois State Archives; Dr. Edward Steers, Jr., a Lincoln assassination expert; Frank J. Williams, Chairman of the Lincoln Forum and others agree with Garrera's findings that the Lincoln flag is authentic.
