= Confederate Secret Service =

Secret service organizations operating under the American Confederacy

The Confederate Secret Service refers to any of a number of official and semi-official secret service organizations and operations performed by the Confederate States of America during the American Civil War. Some of the organizations were directed by the Confederate government, others operated independently with government approval, while still others were either completely independent of the government or operated with only its tacit acknowledgment.

By 1864, the Confederate government was attempting to gain control of the various operations that had developed since the beginning of the war, but often with little success. Secret legislation was put before the Confederate Congress to create an official Special and Secret Bureau of the War Department. The legislation was not enacted until March 1865 and was never implemented; however, a number of groups and operations have been referred to historically as having been part of the Confederate Secret Service. In April 1865, most of the official papers of the Secret Service were burned by Confederate Secretary of State Judah P. Benjamin just before the Confederate government evacuated Richmond, although a few pages of a financial ledger remain. Thus, the complete story of Confederate secret operations may never be known.

== Military operations and officially sanctioned Secret Service activities ==
=== Agents within the United States ===
The Confederacy benefited from the services of a number of "traditional" spies including Rose O'Neal Greenhow and Aaron Van Camp, who appear to have been members of an espionage gang during the formative period of the Confederate government. Greenhow was incarcerated at the Old Capitol Prison in Washington, D.C. Thomas Jordan recruited Greenhow and provided her with cypher code.

Other known espionage agents include Belle Boyd and Catherine Virginia Baxley. John Surratt served as both a courier and spy.

John H. Sothoron appears to have commanded the Confederate underground in St. Mary's County, Maryland. Col. Sothoron lived near Charlotte Hall Military Academy. His son, Webster, attended the school and was reputed to be a spy. Richard Thomas (Zarvona) and David Herold were also students, although Herold's attending is disputed.

Samuel Mudd, of Charles County, Maryland, seems to have lent shelter to agents and harbored John Wilkes Booth, although Mudd's role is disputed.

=== Foreign agents ===
The Confederacy's first secret-service agent may have been James D. Bulloch. In 1861, almost immediately after the attack on Fort Sumter, Bulloch traveled to Liverpool, England, to establish a base of operations. The United Kingdom was officially neutral in the conflict between North and South, but private and public sentiment favored the Confederacy. Britain was also willing to buy cotton that could be smuggled past the Union blockade, which provided the South with its only real source of hard currency. Bulloch established a relationship with the shipping company of Fraser, Trenholm & Company to buy and sell Confederate cotton, using this currency to purchase arms and ammunition, uniforms, and other supplies for the war effort. Fraser, Trenholm & Co. became, in effect, the Confederacy's international bankers. Bulloch also arranged for the construction and secret purchase of the commerce raider CSS Alabama, as well as many of the blockade runners that acted as the Confederacy's commercial lifeline.

Jacob Thompson was the Confederate commissioner in Canada. He distributed money, coordinated agents, and may have planned covert operations. He was involved with the attempt to liberate Confederate prisoners at Johnson's Island, a Union facility which also housed political prisoners.

Thompson met with Clement Laird Vallandigham, an Ohio politician. Vallandigham, a potential presidential candidate against Lincoln, was arrested by Union General Ambrose Burnside and deported to the Confederacy. Vallandigham made his way to Canada.

=== Signal Corps ===
The Confederate Signal Corps was established in 1862. Nearly 1,200 men were in the secret service, most of whom were well-to-do and knew more than one language. Example: Alexander Campbell Rucker, brother of Colonel Edmund Winchester Rucker, was in the Confederate Secret Service. Major William Norris was their commander. Norris may have worked for Braxton Bragg. On April 26, 1865, Norris took the position of the Commissioner of Prisoner Exchange Robert Ould. Ould may have been the civilian liaison to the corps, and Bragg the military liaison, with both reporting to Jefferson Davis or Judah Benjamin.

Thomas Nelson Conrad was a scout and spy who worked with Norris.

=== Torpedo Bureau ===
The Torpedo Bureau, authorized on October 31, 1862, and commanded by Brigadier General Gabriel Rains, was charged with the production of various explosive devices, including land mines, naval mines, and "coal torpedoes" (bombs disguised as chunks of coal, intended to destroy boilers).

=== Submarine Battery Service ===
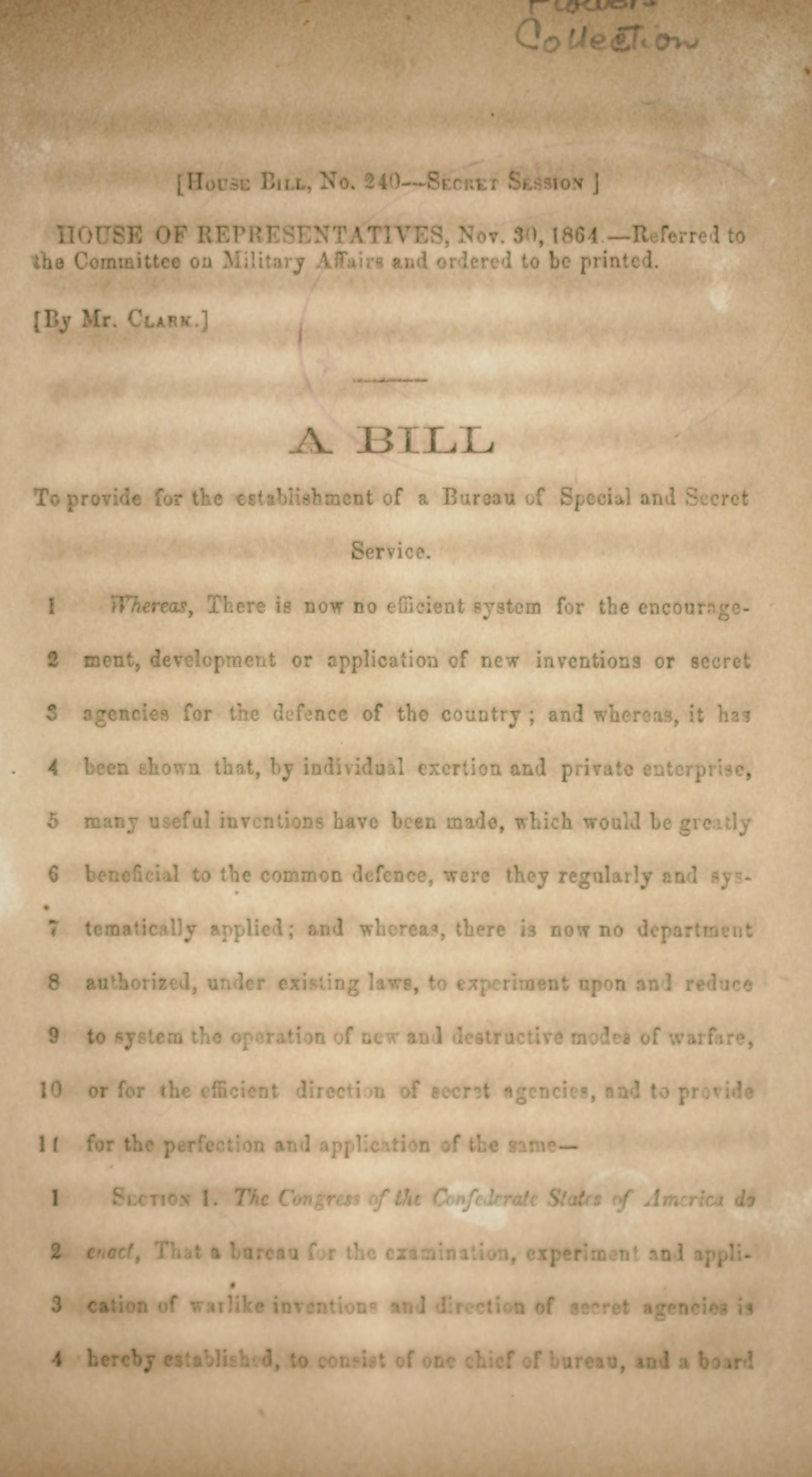
First page of the bill to establish a Bureau of Special and Secret Service.

Created at the same time as the Torpedo Bureau, the Submarine Battery Service were the Confederate Navy's torpedo specialists. The service primarily utilized electrically detonated torpedoes to protect the South's waterways. Originally commanded by Commander Matthew Fontaine Maury, known as "The Pathfinder of the Seas", Maury was succeeded by his protégé, Lt. Hunter Davidson, when Maury was sent abroad to further his experiments involving electrical torpedoes and to procure needed supplies and ships. The service operated along the James River between Richmond and Hampton Roads, Virginia, Wilmington, North Carolina, Charleston, South Carolina, and Savannah, Georgia, among other locales.

=== Bureau of Special and Secret Service ===
During November 1864, the Confederate House of Representatives in secret session referred a bill “for the establishment of a Bureau of Special and Secret Service” to their Committee on Military Affairs. The bureau was to have a “polytechnic corps”. The existing “torpedo corps” was to be incorporated into the bureau. New inventions were to be encouraged.

=== Operations in Canada and the Maritime Provinces ===
Confederate agents operated around Halifax, Quebec City, Niagara, Toronto, and (especially) Montreal. Confederate agents operating in Canada were considerable enough to be widely tolerated. For example, in Toronto,

Southern agents operated freely and openly with little to no concern from local authorities who were governed by British North America’s official policy of neutrality. Indeed, Southerners enjoyed the sympathy of most of Toronto’s political, social, and business elite—although few were as enthusiastic in supporting the Confederate cause as George Taylor Denison III.

Canadian banks funded their activities and Toronto, Montreal, St. Catharines, and Halifax were among the bases of well-financed Confederate networks by Confederate agents and sympathizers in these cities. Several Canadian hotels across the territory, including the Queen's Hotel, Toronto and St. Louis hotel in Quebec City, acted as informal headquarters for Confederate Secret Service activities.

== Sanctioned destructionists, privateers, and licensed operators ==
=== The bounty law ===
The Confederacy knew it was in trouble from the beginning of war without its own Navy. The few ships owned privately that could be converted to military service were no match for the Union Navy. On May 21, 1861, the Confederate Congress enacted an amendment to their May 6, 1861 Declaration of War which provided that

[T]he government of the Confederate States will pay to the cruiser or cruisers of any private armed vessel commissioned under said act, twenty per centum on the value of each and every vessel of war belonging to the enemy, that may be sunk or destroyed by such private armed vessel or vessels, the value of the armament to be included in the estimate.

In 1862, possibly due to a suggestion, the Confederate Congress enacted a bounty of fifty percent of the value of any vessel destroyed by means of a new invention:

The Congress of the Confederate States of America do enact, That the first section of the above entitled Act be so amended, that, in case any person or persons shall invent or construct any new machine or engine, or contrive any new method for destroying the armed vessels of the enemy, he or they shall receive fifty per centum of the value of each and every such vessel that may be sunk or destroyed, by means of such invention or contrivance...

This attracted the attention of entrepreneurs. Horace Lawson Hunley organized a group of investors to finance the submarine H. L. Hunley that bears his name, hoping to profit from the bounties. Private individuals with engineering experience such as E. C. Singer, C. Williams, and Zere McDaniel developed and patented new torpedoes and fuses.

=== The coal torpedo ===
Developed by Thomas Courtenay of the Confederate Secret Service, coal torpedoes were hollow metal castings resembling a lump of coal. The castings were filled with powder and then secreted in the coal bunker of enemy vessels. When the coal replicas were shoveled into the fire boxes of ship's boilers, the resulting explosions either damaged or sank the ship. A hollowed out piece of wood filled with powder was used against river steamers. These could be concealed in the fuel piles of cord wood stacked along the river banks.

=== Other operations ===
The Dahlgren Affair was a Union cavalry raid on the Confederate capital, Richmond, Virginia, intended to free Union prisoners being held there. The plan was to use the Union men to burn down the city and assassinate Confederate President Jefferson Davis. The raid failed, but it incensed Davis and the Confederate leadership. In view of this, and the Confederacy's dismal fortunes on the battlefield, the secret service was re-invigorated in 1864. It was involved in the October 19, 1864 St. Albans Raid in Vermont by personnel from Canada, the plan for arson in northern cities, and future Kentucky governor Luke P. Blackburn's biological warfare plot.

== Possible involvement in the Lincoln assassination ==
In 1988, two career intelligence officers, William A. Tidwell and David Winfred Gaddy, and an amateur historian who specialized in the assassination of Abraham Lincoln, James O. Hall, published Come Retribution: The Confederate Secret Service and the Assassination of Lincoln, in which they presented a circumstantial case that the Confederate Secret Service and Major Cornelius Boyle's intelligence station at Gordonsville, Virginia were involved with the death of Lincoln. According to this scenario, the C.S.S. first planned, using Booth as its agent, to kidnap Lincoln and hold him hostage in order to pressure the North into ending the Civil War; the code word for this operation was "Come retribution". When this plan failed to develop, they turned instead to an attempt to bomb the White House while a conference of Union officials was occurred. This plot also failed, and the Confederate Secret Service made other plans, leaving Booth to perform the conspiracy to assassinate Lincoln and other U.S. officials without the backing of the C.S.S. Similar arguments are presented in Edward Steers Jr.'s 2005 book, Blood on the Moon: The Assassination of Abraham Lincoln.

In 1995, Tidwell returned to the subject with the publication of April '65: Confederate Covert Action in the American Civil War, in which new evidence is examined to show that the capacity of the Confederate Secret Service for secret warfare was larger than had previously been thought. There is little indication that the theories presented in these books have been accepted by significant numbers of Civil War historians, although John D. McKenzie, in his 1997 book Uncertain Glory: Lee's Generalship Re-Examined speculates that one of the reasons that Robert E. Lee and Jefferson Davis did not end the war after Lincoln's re-election in 1864, when a Confederate military victory was virtually impossible, may have been to allow time for these plots to come to fruition.

== In popular culture ==
Literature

- On the Wing of Occasions, by Joel Chandler Harris, Doubleday, New York, 1904
- The Butcher's Cleaver, (A Tale of the Confederate Secret Services.) by W. Patrick Lang Rosemont Books, 2007, ISBN 978-0-595-71185-7
- Death Piled Hard, (A Tale of the Confederate Secret Services.) by W. Patrick Lang iUniverse 2009 ISBN 978-1-4401-2391-7
- Down the Sky, (Volume Three of the "Strike the Tent" trilogy) by W. Patrick Lang iUniverse 2012 ISBN 978-1-4697-7180-9
- The Shenandoah Spy by Francis Hamit, Brass Cannon Books, 2008 ISBN 978-1-59595-902-7
- The Queen of Washington by Francis Hamit, Brass Cannon Books 2011 ISBN 978-1-59595-171-7

Television

- A self-igniting liquid, referred to as "Greek fire" in Season 1 Episodes 7–11 of the BBC America television series Copper, is featured as part of a plot by Confederate Secret Service agents to burn New York City, in 1864.
- The Confederate Secret Service is mentioned frequently in the Apple TV series Manhunt, which follows the assassination of Abraham Lincoln and subsequent manhunt for John Wilkes Booth. As Edwin Stanton investigates, the possibility that members of the Confederate Secret Service were involved or that the Confederate government ordered the assassination is continuously brought up.

Modern politics

- The phrase "come retribution" has been discussed in association with the 2024 presidential campaign of Donald Trump. Reportedly, Trump advisor Steve Bannon referred to a campaign speech by Trump as his "come retribution" speech during a conversation with a journalist; Bannon also told the same journalist to read a book of that title about the Confederate Secret Service plot against Abraham Lincoln.

== See also ==
- Nitre and Mining Bureau
- American Civil War spies
- Black Dispatches
- Bureau of Military Information
- Confederate Army of Manhattan
- List of New York Civil War regiments
- New York City in the American Civil War
- New York National Guard (American Civil War)
- St. Nicholas Hotel (New York City)
