= Camouflages for sabotage equipment used by the German sabotage services in World War II =

Declassified MI5 file

"Camouflages for sabotage equipment used by the German sabotage services" is the name of a declassified MI5 file which itemizes Nazi deception techniques employed in World War II. The file was made known to the public in 2003. During the War, German saboteurs operating against Britain designed a range of unconventional bomb disguises. According to Mi5, the German weapons were as ingenious as those invented by Britain's Special Operations Executive, which had been detailed in a series of files which had already been declassified in 1999. Disguises included tins of plums, throat lozenges, shaving brushes, batteries, wood, coal, stuffed dogs and, notably, a chocolate bar.

== Chocolate bar bomb ==
Arguably the most unconventional bomb was the chocolate bar bomb that was intended to be smuggled into the Royal household with the purpose of assassination. None of the chocolate bars reached Britain, but British authorities did capture some in places as far away as Turkey. A secondary use for the proposed disguised chocolate bar was as an emergency hand grenade.

The chocolate bar bomb was made of steel with a thin covering of real chocolate. When the piece of chocolate at the end was broken off, the canvas detonator was pulled, and, after a delay of seven seconds, the bomb would explode.

To kill a member of the British royal family, the bar would have had to be smuggled into the residence by the saboteurs themselves or smuggled into a box that would have been taken into Buckingham Palace from an ordinary source. None of the saboteurs got close enough to London to carry out the Nazi plan. These ingenious objects got no further than four explosive cans of peas, which were found on German agents who landed in Ireland by small boat; the agents claimed that they hoped to get them into the Palace. Why any member of the Royal Family would be opening a tin of peas themselves, however, does not seem to have been taken into account.

== See also ==
- Exploding cigar
