= Sultana (steamboat) =

American Mississippi steamboat, sank 1865

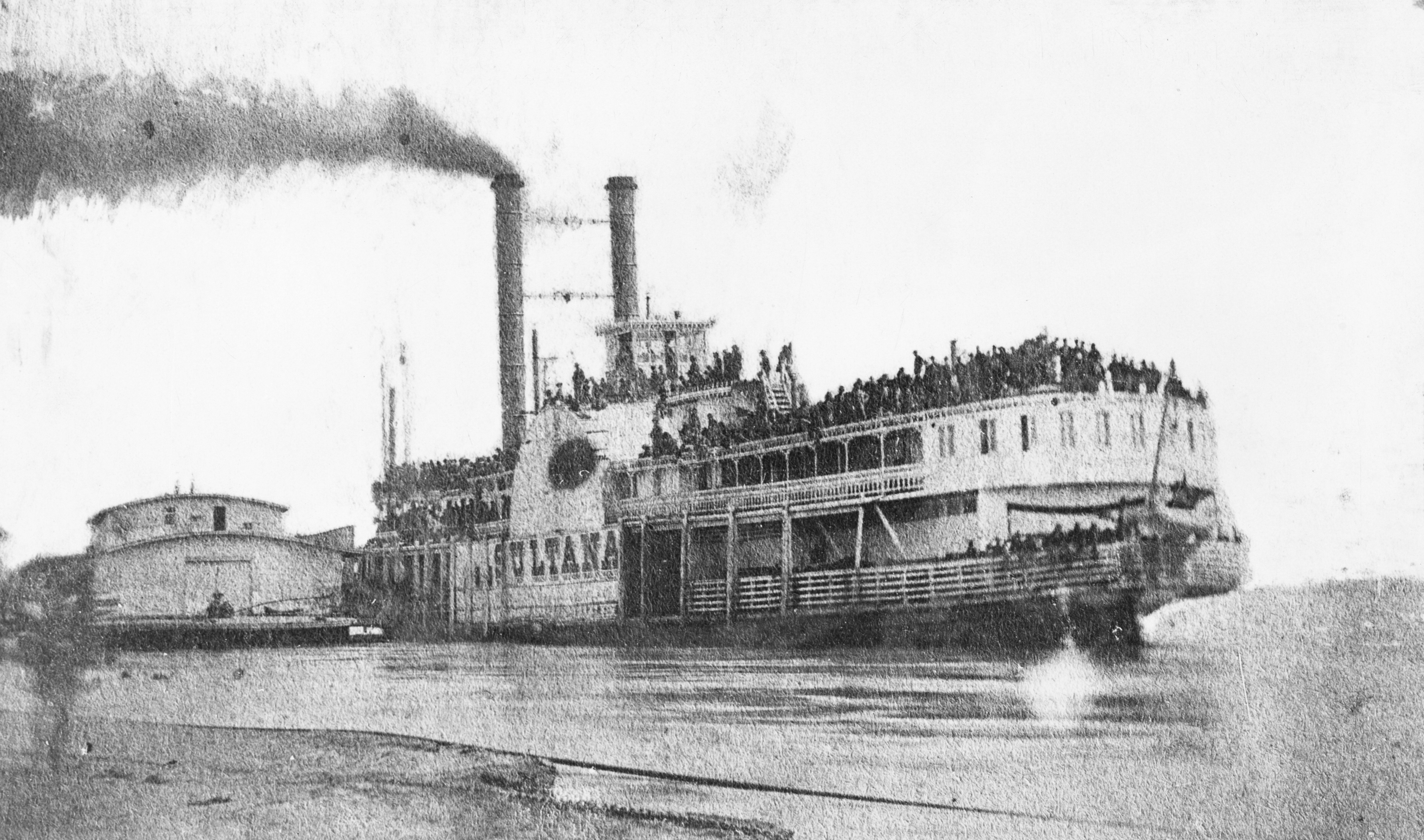
- Sultana at Helena, Arkansas, on April 26, 1865, the day before her destruction. A crowd of paroled prisoners covers her decks.

History
- Name: Sultana
- Owner: Initially Capt. Preston Lodwick, then a consortium including Capt. James Cass Mason
- Port of registry: United States
- Route: St. Louis, Missouri, to New Orleans, Louisiana
- Builder: John Litherbury Boatyard, Cincinnati, Ohio
- Launched: January 3, 1863
- In service: 1863
- Fate: Exploded and sank April 27, 1865, on the Mississippi River 7 miles (11 km) north of Memphis, Tennessee 35°11′26″N 90°6′52″W

General characteristics
- Tonnage: 1,719 GRT
- Length: 260 feet (79 m)
- Beam: 42 feet (13 m)
- Decks: Four decks (including pilothouse)
- Propulsion: 34 ft (10 m) diameter paddlewheels
- Capacity: 376 passengers and cargo
- Crew: 85

Sultana was a commercial side-wheel steamboat which exploded and sank on the Mississippi River on April 27, 1865, killing 1,164 people in what remains the worst maritime disaster in United States history.

Constructed of wood in 1863 by the John Litherbury Boatyard in Cincinnati, Ohio, Sultana was intended for the lower Mississippi cotton trade. The steamer registered 1,719 tons and normally carried a crew of 85. For two years, she ran a regular route between St. Louis and New Orleans and was frequently commissioned to carry troops during the American Civil War. Although designed with a capacity of only 376 passengers and 85 crewmembers, she was carrying 2,127 people, many of them recently released Union Army prisoners of war, when three of the boat's four boilers exploded and caused her to sink near Memphis, Tennessee. The disaster was overshadowed in the press by events surrounding the end of the Civil War, including the killing of President Abraham Lincoln's assassin John Wilkes Booth the day earlier. No one was ever held accountable for the disaster.

== Construction ==
Sultana was launched on January 3, 1863, the fifth steamboat to bear the name. The vessel measured 260 feet (79 m) long, with a 42 feet (13 m) width at the beam, displaced 1,719 short tons (1,559 t), and had a 7-foot (2.1 m) draft. Her two side-mounted paddle wheels were driven by four fire-tube steam boilers. Introduced in 1848, they could generate twice as much steam per fuel load as conventional boilers. Each fire-tube boiler was 18 feet (5.5 m) long and 46 inches (120 cm) in diameter and contained 24 five-inch (13 cm) flues which ran the length of the boilers.

The power of the boilers came with risk – the water levels around the fire tubes had to be carefully maintained at all times. The areas between the many flues clogged easily, especially since dirty river water carried much sediment, and were difficult to clean. Low water levels could cause hot spots leading to metal fatigue, significantly increasing the risk of an explosion. Since most steamboats of the time were constructed of lightweight wood covered with oil-based paint and varnish, fires were a significant concern.

== Disaster ==
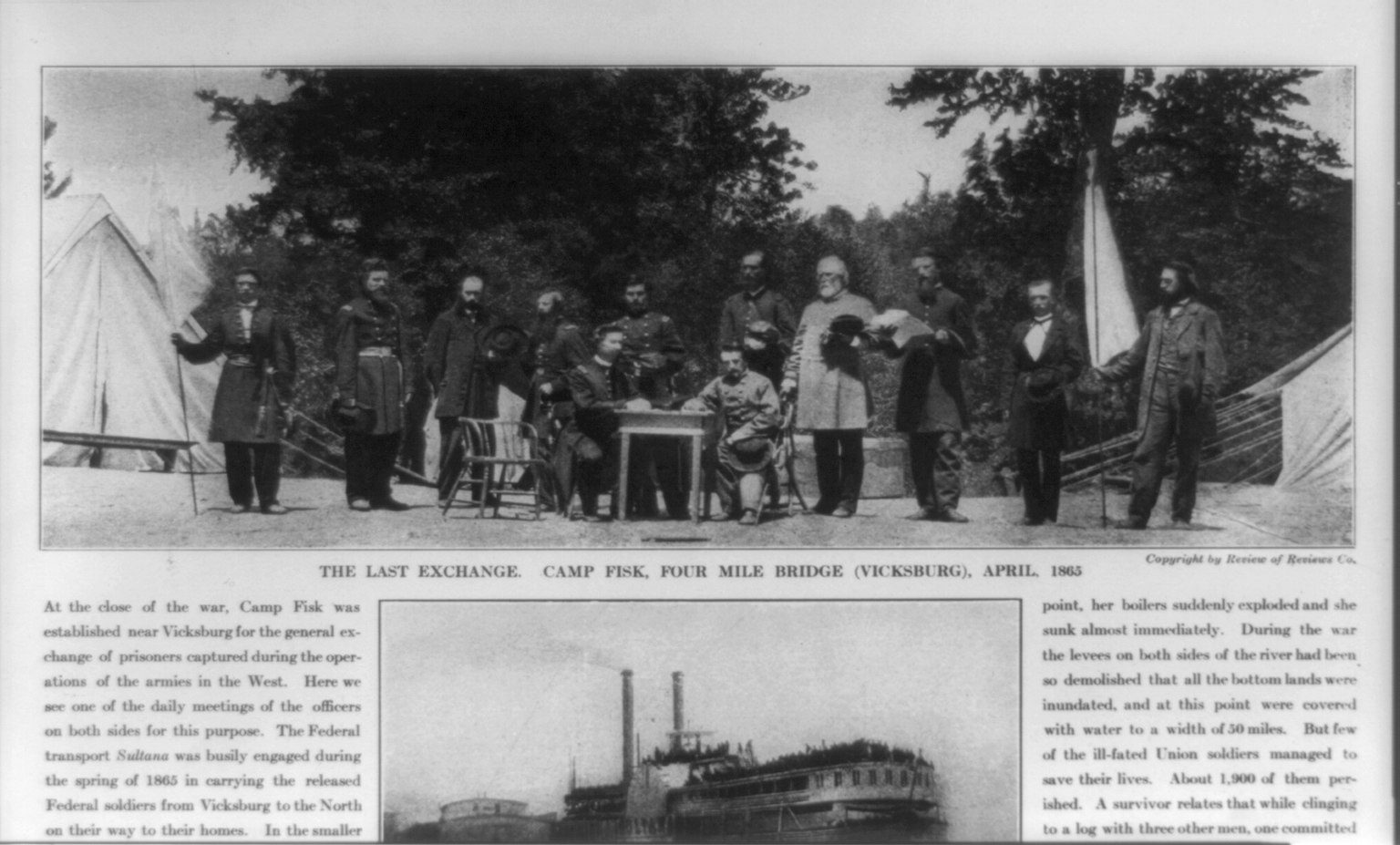
POW Camp Fisk, Four Mile Bridge, Vicksburg, Mississippi, April 1865

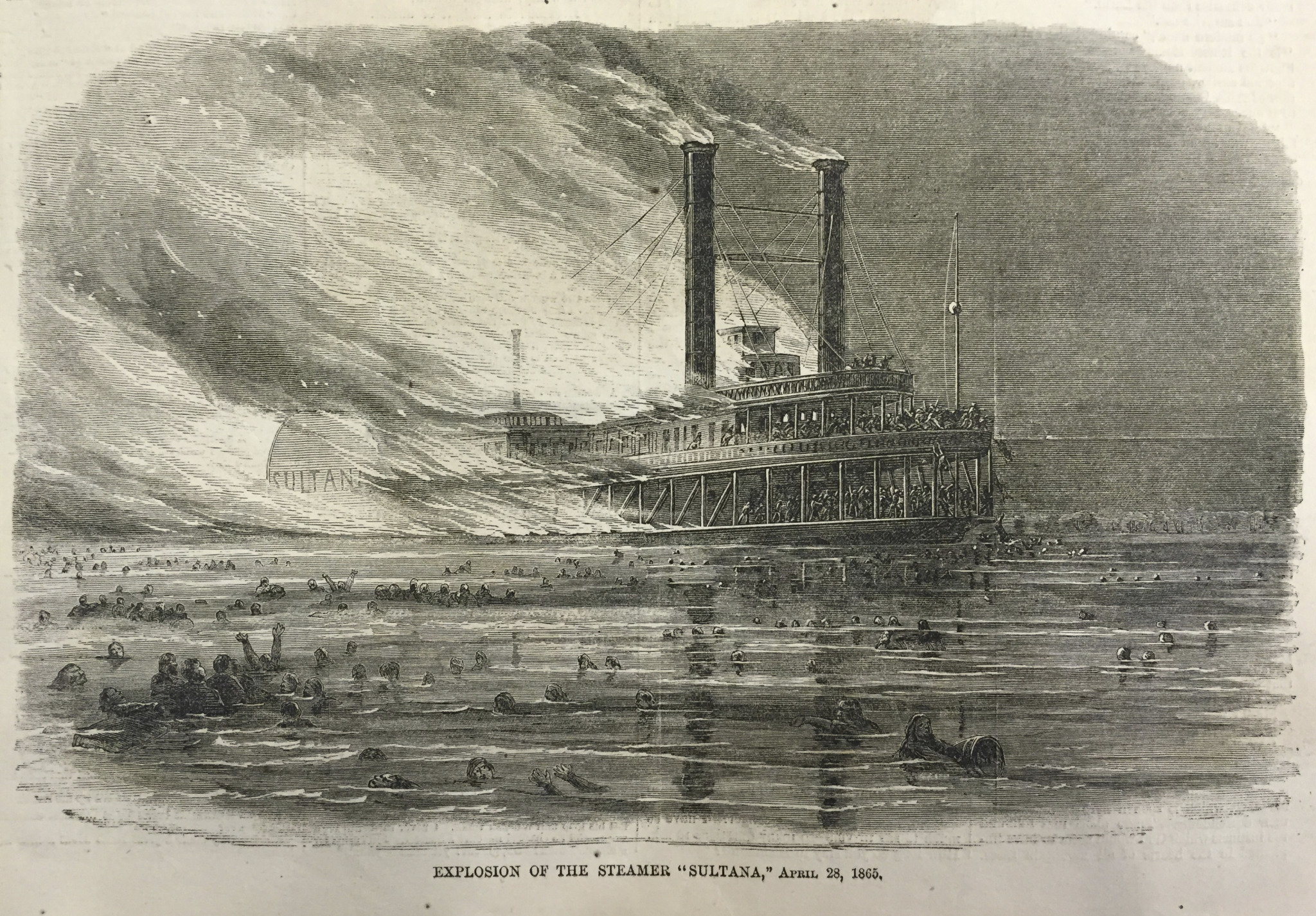
Sultana on fire, from Harper's Weekly

=== Background ===
Under the command of Captain James Cass Mason of St. Louis, Sultana left St. Louis on April 13, 1865, bound for New Orleans. On the morning of April 15, she was tied up at Cairo, Illinois, when word reached the city that U.S. President Abraham Lincoln had been shot in Washington, D.C. Immediately, Captain Mason grabbed an armload of Cairo newspapers and headed south to spread the news, knowing that telegraphic communication with the southern states had been almost totally cut off because of the recently ended American Civil War.

Upon reaching Vicksburg, Mississippi, Mason was approached by Captain Reuben Benton Hatch, the chief quartermaster at Vicksburg, with a proposal. Thousands of recently released Union prisoners of war who had been held in the Confederate prison camps at Cahaba near Selma, Alabama, and Andersonville in southwest Georgia, had been brought to a small parole camp outside of Vicksburg to await release to the northern states. The U.S. government would pay US$2.75 per enlisted man and US$8 per officer to any steamboat captain who would take a group north. Knowing that Mason needed money, Hatch suggested that he could guarantee Mason a full load of about 1,000 prisoners if Mason would agree to give him a kickback. Mason quickly agreed to Hatch's offer, hoping to gain much money through this deal.

Leaving Vicksburg, Sultana traveled downriver to New Orleans, continuing to spread the news of Lincoln's assassination. On April 21, Sultana left New Orleans with about seventy cabin and deck passengers and a small amount of livestock. She also carried a crew of 85. About ten hours south of Vicksburg, one of Sultana's four boilers sprang a leak. Under reduced pressure, the steamboat limped into Vicksburg for repairs and to pick up her promised load of prisoners.

=== Faulty boiler repair ===
While the paroled prisoners, primarily from the states of Ohio, Michigan, Indiana, Kentucky, Tennessee and West Virginia, were brought from the parole camp to Sultana, a mechanic was brought down to work on the leaky boiler. Although the mechanic wanted to cut out and replace a ruptured seam, the chief engineer, Nathan Wintringer, knew such a job would take a few days and cost the Sultana its precious load of prisoners. By the time the repairs would have been completed, the prisoners would have been sent home on other boats. Instead, Wintringer convinced the mechanic to make temporary repairs, hammering back the bulged boiler plate and riveting a patch of lesser thickness over the seam. Instead of taking two or three days, the temporary repair took only one. During her time in port, and while the repairs were being made, Sultana took on the paroled prisoners.

=== Overloaded ===
Although Hatch had suggested that Mason might get as many as 1,000 released Union prisoners, a mix-up with the parole camp books and suspicion of bribery from other steamboat captains caused the Union officer in charge of the loading, Captain George Augustus Williams, to place every man at the parole camp on board Sultana, believing the number to be less than 1,500. Although Sultana had a legal capacity of only 376 passengers, by the time she backed away from Vicksburg on the night of April 24, she was severely overcrowded with 1,950 paroled prisoners, 22 guards from the 58th Ohio Volunteer Infantry, 70 fare-paying cabin passengers, and 85 crew members, for a total of 2,127 people. Many of the paroled prisoners had been weakened by their incarceration and associated illnesses but had managed to gain some strength while waiting at the parole camp to be officially released. The men were packed into every available space as all cabin spaces were already filled with civilian passengers; the overflow was so severe that in some places, the decks began to creak and sag and had to be supported with heavy wooden beams.

Sultana spent two days traveling upriver, fighting against one of the worst spring floods in the river's history. At some places, the river overflowed the banks and spread out 3 miles (4.8 km) wide. Trees along the river bank were almost completely covered until only the very tops of the trees were visible above the swirling, powerful water. On April 26, Sultana stopped at Helena, Arkansas, where photographer Thomas W. Bankes took a picture of the grossly overcrowded vessel. Sultana subsequently arrived at Memphis, Tennessee, around 7 p.m., and the crew began unloading 120 tons (109 tonnes) of sugar from the hold. Near midnight, Sultana left Memphis, leaving behind about 200 men. She then went a short distance upriver to take on a new load of coal from some coal barges and then, at about 1:00 a.m., started north again.

=== Explosion ===
At around 2 a.m. on April 27, 1865, when Sultana was about seven miles (11 km) north of Memphis, its boilers suddenly and violently exploded, killing many people instantly. First one boiler exploded, followed a split-second later by two more.

The massive steam explosion came from the top rear of the boilers. It went upward at a 45-degree angle, tearing through the crowded decks above and completely destroying the pilothouse. Without a pilot to steer the boat, Sultana became a drifting, burning hulk. The violent explosion flung some deck passengers into the water and blew a gaping 25–30-foot (7.6–9.1 m) hole in the steamer. With the boilers blown to pieces, the twin smokestacks fell; the starboard smokestack fell backward into the blasted hole, and the port smokestack fell forward onto the crowded forward section of the upper deck, hitting the steamboat's bell as it fell. The forward part of the upper deck collapsed onto the middle deck, killing and trapping many in the wreckage. Fortunately, the sturdy railings around the twin openings of the main stairway prevented the upper deck from crushing down completely onto the middle deck. The men located around the twin openings quickly crawled under the wreckage and down the main stairs. Further back, the collapsing decks formed a slope that led down into the exposed furnace boxes. The broken wood caught fire and turned the remaining superstructure into a raging inferno. Survivors panicked and raced for the safety of the water, but in their weakened condition, they soon ran out of strength and began to cling to each other. Whole groups drowned together in the river.

=== Rescue attempts ===
While the Sultana burned, and the men on the steamboat were either already dead or fighting for their lives, the southbound steamer Bostona (No. 2), built in 1860 but coming downriver on her maiden voyage after being refurbished, arrived at about 2:30 a.m., a half hour after the explosion, and rescued scores of survivors. At the same time, dozens of people had floated 7 miles (11 km) downriver and began to float past the Memphis waterfront, calling for help until they were noticed by the crews of docked steamboats and U.S. warships, who immediately set about rescuing the survivors. Eventually, the hulk of Sultana drifted about six miles (10 km) to the west bank of the river, burned to the waterline and sank at around 7 a.m. near Mound City and present-day Marion, Arkansas, about five hours after the explosion. Other vessels joined the rescue, including the steamers Silver Spray, Jenny Lind, and Pocahontas, the navy ironclad USS Essex and the sidewheel gunboat USS Tyler.

Passengers who survived the initial explosion had to risk their lives in the icy spring runoff of the Mississippi or burn with the boat. Many died of drowning or hypothermia. Some survivors were plucked from the tops of semi-submerged trees along the Arkansas shore. Bodies of victims continued to be found downriver for months, some as far as Vicksburg. Many bodies were never recovered. Most of Sultana's officers, including Captain Mason, were among those who perished.

=== Casualties ===
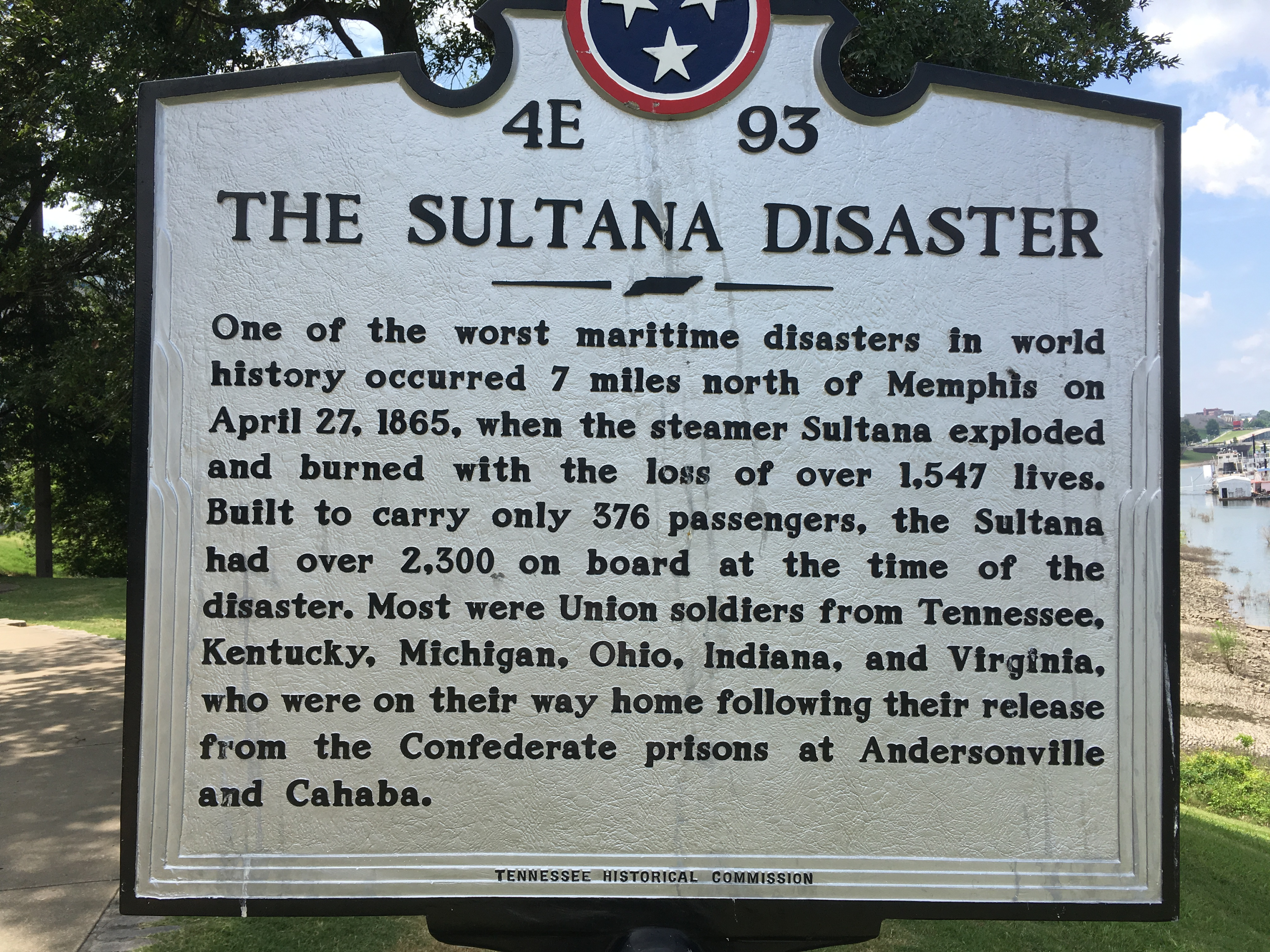
Historic marker in Memphis

The exact death toll is unknown, although the most recent evidence indicates that 1,164 died. On May 19, 1865, less than a month after the disaster, Brigadier General William Hoffman, Commissary General of Prisoners who investigated the disaster, reported an overall loss of soldiers, passengers, and crew of 1,238. In February 1867, the Bureau of Military Justice placed the death toll at 1,100. In 1880, the United States Congress, in conjunction with the War Department, reported the loss of life as 1,259. The official count by the United States Customs Service was 1,547. In 1880, the War Department placed the number of survivors at 931, but the most recent research places the number at 963. The dead soldiers were interred at the Fort Pickering cemetery, located on the south shore of Memphis. A year later, when the U.S. government established the Memphis National Cemetery on the northeast side of the city, the bodies were moved there. Three civilian victims of the wreck of Sultana are interred at Elmwood Cemetery in Memphis.

=== Survivors ===
Because Union forces had captured Memphis in 1862 and turned it into a supply and recuperation city, numerous local hospitals treated the roughly 760 survivors with the latest medical equipment and trained personnel. Of this group, there were only 31 deaths between April 28 and June 28. Newspaper accounts indicate that the residents of Memphis had sympathy for the victims despite the ongoing Union occupation. The Chicago Opera Troupe, a minstrel group that had traveled upriver on Sultana before getting off at Memphis, staged a benefit performance, while the crew of the gunboat Essex raised US$1,000 (equivalent to $21,033 in 2025).

In December 1885, the survivors living in the northern states of Indiana, Michigan, and Ohio began attending annual reunions, forming the National Sultana Survivors' Association. Eventually, the group settled on meeting in the Toledo, Ohio area. Perhaps inspired by their northern comrades, a southern group of survivors, men from Tennessee and Kentucky, began meeting in 1889 around Knoxville, Tennessee. Both groups met as close to the April 27 anniversary date as possible, corresponded with each other, and shared the title National Sultana Survivors' Association.

By the mid-1920s, only a handful of survivors could attend the reunions. In 1929, only two men attended the southern reunion. The next year, only one man showed up. The last northern survivor, Private Jordan Barr of the 15th Michigan Volunteer Infantry Regiment, died on May 16, 1938, at age 93. The last of the southern survivors, and last overall survivor, was Private Charles M. Eldridge of the 3rd Tennessee Cavalry Regiment, who died at his home at age 96 on September 8, 1941, more than 76 years after the disaster.

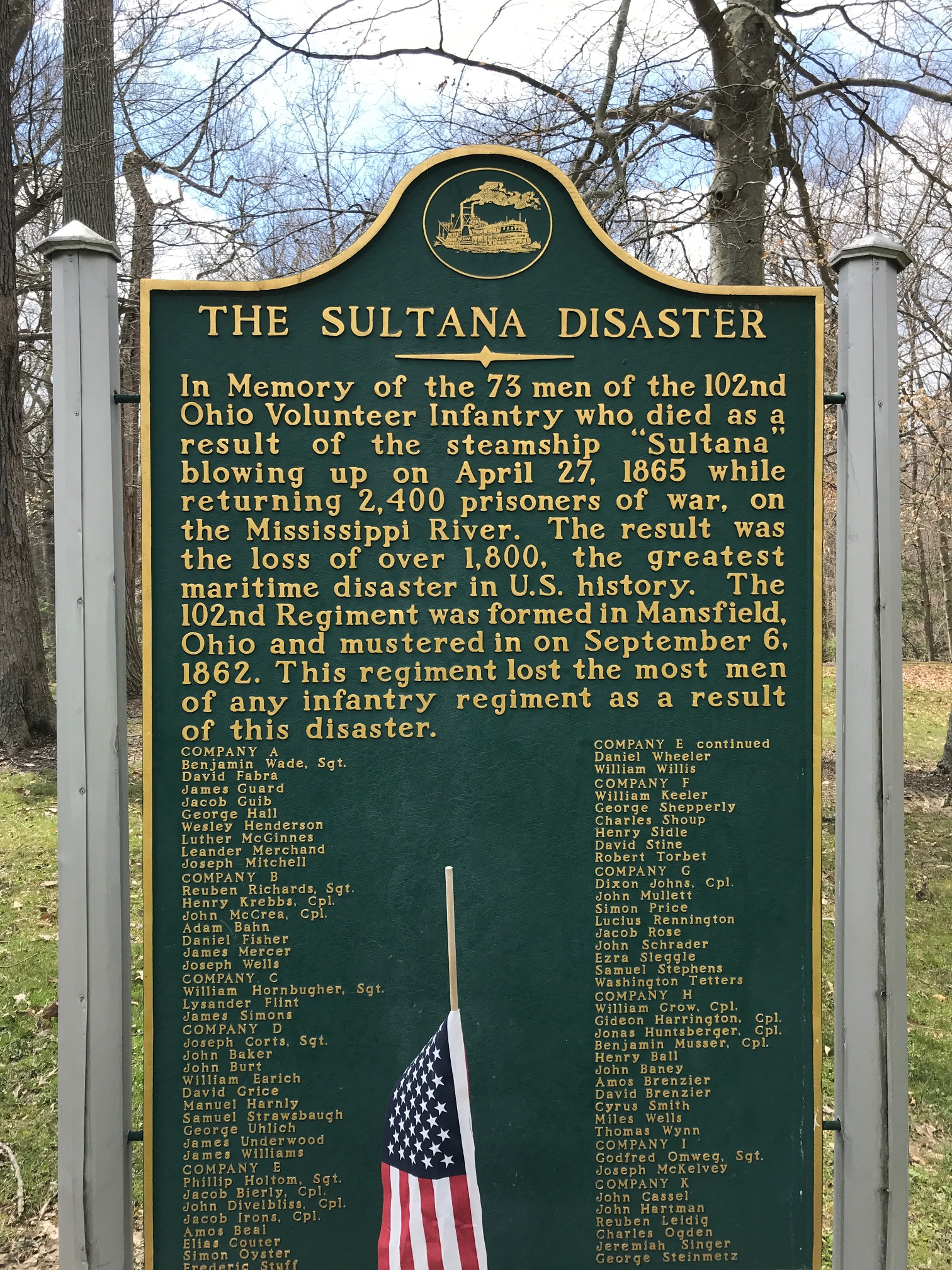
Memorial plaque for those who perished on the Sultana on April 27, 1865. Located in South Park, Mansfield, Ohio.

=== Causes ===
The official cause of the Sultana disaster was determined to be the mismanagement of water levels in the boilers, exacerbated by the fact that the vessel was severely overcrowded and top-heavy. As the steamboat made her way north following the twists and turns of the river, she listed severely from side to side. Her four boilers were interconnected and mounted side-by-side so that if the boat tipped sideways, water would tend to run out of the highest boiler. The fires still going against the empty boiler created hotspots. When the boat tipped the other way, water rushing back into the empty boiler would hit the hot spots and flash instantly to steam, creating a sudden surge in pressure. This effect of careening could have been minimized by maintaining high water levels in the boilers. The official inquiry found that the boilers exploded because of the combined effects of careening, low water levels, and the faulty repair made a few days earlier.

A 2015 investigation into the cause of the disaster by Pat Jennings, principal engineer of the Hartford Steam Boiler Inspection and Insurance Company, which came into existence in 1866 because of the Sultana explosion, determined that three main factors led to the disaster:

- The type of metal used in the construction of the boilers, Charcoal Hammered No. 1, which tends to become brittle with prolonged heating and cooling. Charcoal Hammered No. 1 was no longer used to manufacture boilers after 1879.
- The use of sediment-laden Mississippi River water to feed the boilers. The sediment tended to settle on the bottom of the boilers or clog between the flues and leave hotspots.
- The design of the boilers. Sultana had tubular boilers filled with 24 horizontal five-inch flues. Being so closely packed within the 48-inch (120 cm) diameter boilers tended to cause the muddy sediment to form hot pockets and were extremely difficult to clean. Tubular boilers were discontinued from use on steamboats plying the Lower Mississippi after two more steamboats with tubular boilers exploded shortly after the Sultana explosion.

==== Traditional alternative theories ====
In May 1886, it was claimed that 2nd Lt. James Worthington Barrett, an ex-prisoner and passenger on the steamboat, had caused the explosion. Barrett was a veteran of the Mexican–American War and the Civil War and had been captured at the Battle of Franklin in 1864. He was injured on Sultana and was honorably discharged in May 1865. There is no apparent motive for him to have blown up the boat, especially while on board.

In 1888, a St. Louis resident named William Streetor claimed that his former business partner, Robert Louden, had confessed to him that he had sabotaged Sultana by the use of a coal torpedo. Louden, a former Confederate agent and saboteur who operated in and around St. Louis, had been responsible for the burning of the steamboat Ruth. In support of Louden's claim, what appeared to be a piece of an artillery shell was said to be recovered from the sunken wreck. However, Louden's claim is controversial, and most scholars support the official explanation. The location of the explosion, from the top rear of the boilers and far away from the fireboxes, suggests that Louden's claim of sabotage with an exploding coal torpedo in the firebox, below the front part of the boilers, was pure bravado. Thomas Edgeworth Courtenay, the inventor of the coal torpedo, was a former resident of St. Louis and was involved in similar acts of sabotage against Union shipping interests. Courtenay's great-great-grandson, Joseph Thatcher, who wrote a book on Courtenay and the coal torpedo, denies that a coal torpedo was used in the Sultana disaster.

In 1903, another person reported that Sultana had been sabotaged by a Tennessee farmer who lived along the river and cut wood for passing steamboats. After a few Union gunboats filled up their bunkers but refused to pay, the farmer supposedly hollowed out a log, filled it with gunpowder, and then left the lethal log on his woodpile. As stated in the 1903 newspaper article, the log was mistakenly taken by Sultana. However, Sultana was a coal-burning boat and not a wood-burner.

An episode of the PBS series History Detectives that aired on July 2, 2014, reviewed the known evidence, thoroughly disputed a theory of sabotage, and then focused on the question of why Sultana was allowed to be crowded to several times its normal capacity before departure. The report blamed quartermaster Capt. Reuben Benton Hatch, an individual with a long history of corruption and incompetence, who kept his job through political connections: he was the younger brother of Illinois politician Ozias M. Hatch, an advisor and close friend of President Lincoln. Throughout the war, Captain Hatch had shown incompetence as a quartermaster and competence as a thief, bilking the government out of thousands of dollars. Although brought up on courts-martial charges, Hatch managed to get letters of recommendation from no less reputable personages than President Lincoln and General Ulysses S. Grant. The letters reside in the National Archives in Washington, D.C. After the disaster, Reuben Benton Hatch refused three separate subpoenas to appear before Captain Speed's trial and give testimony. He died in 1871 due to alcoholism, having escaped justice because of his numerous highly placed patrons—including two presidents.

=== Lack of accountability ===
Despite the magnitude of the disaster, no one was ever formally held accountable. Captain Frederic Speed, a Union officer who sent the 1,950 paroled prisoners into Vicksburg from the parole camp, was charged with grossly overcrowding Sultana and found guilty. However, the Judge Advocate General of the United States Army overturned the guilty verdict because Speed had been at the parole camp all day and had not personally placed a single soldier on board Sultana. Captain George Augustus Williams, who had placed the men on board, was a regular Army officer and West Point graduate, and the military refused to go after one of their own. Captain Hatch, who had concocted a bribe with Captain Mason to crowd as many men onto Sultana as possible, had quickly quit the service to avoid a court-martial and then had gone into hiding. Captain Mason, who was ultimately responsible for dangerously overloading his vessel and concurring on the faulty repairs to her leaky boiler, had died in the disaster. In the end, no one was ever held accountable for what remains the deadliest maritime disaster in United States history.

== Legacy ==
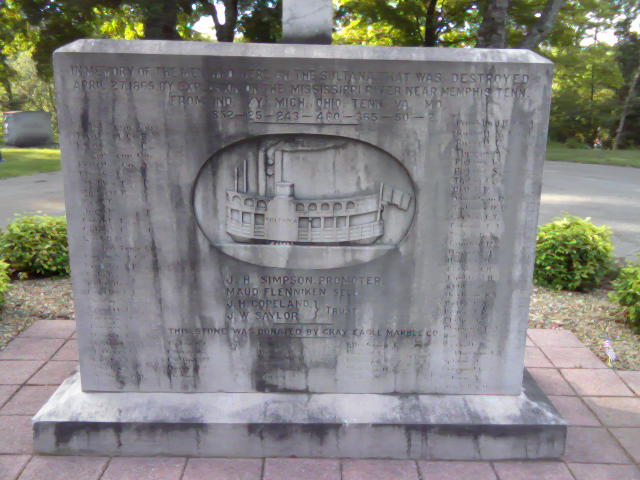
Sultana Memorial at the Mount Olive Baptist Church Cemetery in Knoxville, Tennessee, in 2010

Monuments and historical markers to Sultana and her victims have been erected at Memphis, Tennessee; Muncie, Indiana; Marion, Arkansas; Vicksburg, Mississippi; Cincinnati, Ohio; Knoxville, Tennessee; Hillsdale, Michigan; and Mansfield, Ohio.

=== Wreck found ===
In 1982, a local archaeological expedition led by Memphis attorney Jerry O. Potter uncovered what was believed to be the wreckage of Sultana. Blackened wooden deck planks and timbers were found about 32 feet (10 m) under a soybean field on the Arkansas side of the river, about 4 miles (6 km) from Memphis. The Mississippi River has changed course several times since the disaster, leaving the wreck under dry land and far from the present-day riverbanks. The main channel now flows about 2 miles (3 km) east of its 1865 position.

=== Museum ===
In 2015, on the 150th anniversary of the disaster, an interim Sultana Disaster Museum was opened in Marion, Arkansas, the closest town to the buried remains of the steamboat, directly across the Mississippi River from Memphis. The museum is only a temporary museum, but features a number of relics from Sultana such as shaker plates from the boat's furnace, furnace bricks, a few pieces of wood, and some small metal pieces. The museum also features many artifacts from the Sultana Survivors' Association, as well as a 14-foot (4.3 m) model replica of the boat. One wall is decorated with the names of every soldier, crewmember, and passenger on the boat on April 27, 1865. A new state-of-the-art permanent museum, which will be housed in a renovated auditorium/gymnasium, is expected to open in the fall of 2026.

== In popular culture ==
=== Artwork ===
- The J. Mack Gamble Fund of the Sons and Daughters of Pioneer Rivermen and the Association of Sultana Descendants and Friends sponsored a mural by Louisiana artist Robert Dafford and his crew, entitled The Sultana Departs from Vicksburg, as one of the Vicksburg Riverfront Murals. It was dedicated on April 9, 2005.

=== Novels ===
- Hendricks, Nancy (2015). Terrible Swift Sword: Long Road to the Sultana. CreateSpace Independent Publishing Platform. ISBN 978-1507764688.
- Thom, James Alexander (2015). Fire in the Water. Blue River Press. ISBN 978-1935628569.
- Smith, Joe W. (2010) Sultana! J & M Printing. ISBN 978-1-931916-64-6. Illustrations by Linda L. Smith.

=== Music ===
- Jay Farrar of the band Son Volt wrote a song called "Sultana", paying tribute to "the worst American disaster of the maritime". Farrar calls the boat "the Titanic of the Mississippi" in the song, which was released on the American Central Dust album in 2009.
- King's German Legion – "Blues in the Water" tells a stylized version of the Sultana disaster on their EP release Marching Orders.
- Cory Branan's song "The Wreck of the Sultana" tells the story of the disaster, though the song gets a few details wrong, calling it "deadlier than the Titanic's legendary fall."

=== Film ===
- In 2018, a film called Remember the Sultana, directed by Mark and Mike Marshall and starring Ray Appleton, Mackenzie Astin, and Sean Astin, was released, detailing the maritime disaster.

== See also ==
- List of maritime disasters
- General Slocum disaster – similar disaster in New York City in 1904
- Arisan Maru – Japanese type 2A freighter – torpedoed in 1944
- Sea Wing disaster – Excursion boat overturned 1890
- Eclipse (steamboat) – U.S. troop transport exploded 1865
