= Thomas Courtenay =

Thomas or Tom Courtenay may refer to:

- Thomas Courtenay (of Wootton Courtenay) (died 1356), knight
- Thomas de Courtenay, 5th/13th Earl of Devon (1414–1458)
- Thomas Courtenay, 6th/14th Earl of Devon (1432–1461)
- Thomas Courtenay (British politician) (1782–1841), British politician and author
- Thomas Edgeworth Courtenay (1822–1875), member of the Confederate Secret Service and inventor of the coal torpedo
- Tom Courtenay (born 1937), English actor
- Tom Courtenay (EP), by Yo La Tengo

== See also ==
- Thomas Courtney (disambiguation)
