= Dix–Hill Cartel =

System for exchanging prisoners during the American Civil War

The Dix–Hill Cartel was the first official system for exchanging prisoners during the American Civil War. It was signed by Union Major General John A. Dix and Confederate Major General D. H. Hill at Haxall's Landing on the James River in Virginia on July 22, 1862.

The agreement established a scale of equivalents for captured officers to be exchanged for fixed numbers of enlisted men, and agents from each side were appointed to conduct the exchanges at particular locations. Prisoners could also be released on parole.

The system began to break down when the Congress of the Confederate States of America classified African-American prisoners of war as fugitive slaves on May 1, 1863, who ought to be returned to their owners instead of being exchanged. In the same act, captured white officers of armed "negroes or mulattoes" were withheld as inciters of a "servile insurrection", being threatened with legal prosecution up to and including the death penalty. On July 30, 1863, President Abraham Lincoln issued General Orders 252, which effectively suspended the Dix–Hill Cartel until the Confederate forces agreed to treat black prisoners the same as white prisoners. In August 1864, General Grant refused to reinstate the full agreement because the Union by that time held many more Confederate soldiers as prisoners than there were Union soldiers held by the Confederacy, though some exchanges continued. Exchanges officially resumed in January 1865.

== Earlier prisoner exchanges ==
At the outbreak of the Civil War, the Federal government adopted a tough attitude toward the Confederates. The Lincoln administration wanted to avoid any action that might appear as an official recognition of the Confederate government in Richmond, including the formal transfer of military captives. In the North, public opinion on prisoner exchanges began to soften after the First Battle of Bull Run, when the rebels captured about one thousand Union soldiers.

Prior to the cartel's creation, Union and Confederate forces exchanged prisoners sporadically, usually as an act of humanity between opposing field commanders. In some cases, a transfer of only sick and wounded captives took place. Exchanges for just a couple of prisoners between sides could prove very time-consuming to achieve. A few military commanders unfamiliar with the practice were reluctant to engage in exchanges without explicit approval and instruction from their superiors.

== Progress toward an agreement ==
Throughout the initial months of the Civil War, support for prisoner exchanges grew in the North. Petitions from prisoners in Southern captivity and articles in Northern newspapers increased pressure on the Lincoln administration. On December 11, 1861, the U.S. Congress passed a joint resolution calling on President Lincoln to "inaugurate systematic measures for the exchange of prisoners in the present rebellion."

In Missouri during October and November 1861, Union Maj. General John Frémont and Maj. General Sterling Price of the Missouri State Guard approved the exchange of their existing prisoners and agreed to terms for the transfer of future captives. However, President Abraham Lincoln relieved Frémont of his command on November 2 for his unauthorized emancipation of slaves in Missouri.

In two meetings on February 23 and March 1, 1862, Union Major Gen. John E. Wool and Confederate Brig. Gen. Howell Cobb met to reach an agreement on prisoner exchanges. They discussed many of the provisions later adopted in the Dix-Hill agreement. An earlier cartel arrangement used between the United States and Great Britain in the War of 1812 provided a model for the negotiators to adapt in the 1862 talks.

Differences over which side would cover expenses for prisoner transportation stymied the negotiations between Wool and Cobb. Another issue over how to handle the surplus of prisoners held by one side proved an insurmountable problem. Cobb would not agree to Wool's proposal for an even swap of prisoners at that time while deferring resolution of the surplus issue to later negotiations.

In June 1862, General Cobb met with Union Col. Thomas M. Key, an aide to Maj. Gen. George McClellan, in another attempt to reach an agreement on prisoner exchanges. Key discussed other matters with Cobb beyond the topic of prisoners, and in reply, Secretary of War Edwin Stanton fired a sharp comment to McClellan that

it is not deemed proper for officers bearing flags of truce in respect to the exchange of prisoners to hold any conference with the rebel officers upon the general subject of the existing contest or upon any other subject than what relates to the exchange of prisoners.

To conduct the next round of cartel negotiations, on July 8, Secretary Stanton appointed Maj. Gen. John A. Dix. By early July, General Cobb became ill and could no longer represent the Confederate authorities. As Cobb's replacement, CSA General Robert E. Lee named Maj. Gen. D. H. Hill on July 14. To prepare for his negotiations with his Confederate counterpart in July 1862, General Dix requested that War Secretary Stanton provide a copy of all of General Wool's correspondence with the rebels relating to the prior cartel discussions.

== Summary of the 1862 agreement ==
The cartel agreement established a scale of equivalents to manage the exchange of military officers and enlisted personnel. For example, a naval captain or a colonel in the army would exchange for fifteen privates or common seamen, while personnel of equal ranks would transfer man for man.

The agreement named two locations for the exchanges to occur, one at A. M. Aiken's Landing, below Dutch Gap, in Virginia, and the other at Vicksburg, Mississippi. Each government would appoint an agent to handle the exchange and parole of prisoners. The agreement also allowed the exchange or parole of captives between the commanders of two opposing forces.

In addition, the agreement permitted each side to exchange non-combatants, such as citizens accused of disloyalty, and civilian employees of the military, such as teamsters and sutlers. Authorities were to parole any prisoners not formally exchanged within ten days following their capture. The terms of the cartel prohibited paroled prisoners from returning to the military in any capacity including "the performance of field, garrison, police, or guard, or constabulary duty."

== Operation of the cartel ==
In the first week of August 1862, the cartel's newly appointed agents, Confederate Robert Ould and Union Brig. Gen. Lorenzo Thomas, conducted their first official prisoner exchange under the agreement's terms with a transfer of 3021 Union personnel for 3000 Confederates at Aiken's Landing.

The prisoner exchanges functioned well until December 1862 when Confederate President Jefferson Davis suspended the parole of Union officers following the execution of William Mumford, a New Orleans citizen, by Union General Benjamin F. Butler earlier that year. In reaction, Union Secretary Stanton ordered a halt to all exchanges of commissioned officers.

Further difficulties developed when the Confederate government refused to parole and exchange any African-American soldiers taken captive who might have escaped from slavery. Confederate authorities decided instead to treat these prisoners as runaways suitable only for return to their former owners.

In March 1863, the Confederate exchange agent, Robert Ould, sent a letter to Jefferson Davis with these complaints about the Union's exchange efforts:

I am more and more satisfied every day that the Federal Government does not intend to keep faith with us in the matter of prisoners or exchanges. I believe its officials are taxing their ingenuity to find out the most available methods of deceit and fraud. I received yesterday official evidence that some forty officers entitled long ago to their release, and who in fact are exchanged under existing agreements, are now imprisoned at Camp Chase, and yet the Federal Agent with an earnestness intended to be peculiarly impressive, assured me three days ago, that not one of these officers was confined in that place. Not one day passes that some evidence does not come to hand of Yankee fraud and mendacity. Four weeks ago the Federal Agent informed me in writing that it was not the intention of his Government to make any more arrests of non combatants in our territory, and yet more have been made since that declaration than during any previous equal space of time.

By early June 1863, the exchanges had effectively stopped.

On June 12, 1863, CSA Vice President Alexander Stephens wrote to Jefferson Davis offering his services to travel to Washington, D.C. in order to negotiate the issues over the prisoner exchange as well as to discuss larger diplomatic issues between the Confederate and Union governments. Davis accepted the offer in July 1863 and appointed Stephens as "a military commissioner under flag of truce" to approach the authorities in Washington. His primary mission was:

to establish the cartel for the exchange of prisoners on such a basis as to avoid the constant difficulties and complaints which arise, and to prevent for the future what we deem the unfair conduct of our enemies in evading the delivery of prisoners who fall into their hands; in retarding it by sending them on circuitous routes, and by detaining them sometimes for months in camps in prisons; and in persisting in taking captive noncombatants.

The federal authorities in Washington refused to accept the request to negotiate.

In November 1863, Union General Benjamin Butler requested permission from Secretary of War Edwin Stanton to negotiate for the resumption of the prisoner exchanges. After reviewing correspondence from the Confederates, Butler had an idea that the rebels would exchange captives without regard to their "color, caste, or condition." Since the Federals held twice as many prisoners as their opponents, Butler proposed that a renewal of the exchanges would deplete the number of prisoners held by the Confederates. If the "colored prisoners and their officers" were not handed over, then the Union's remaining surplus of rebel prisoners would serve as hostages for possible "retaliation and reprisal." On December 17, Maj. General Ethan Allen Hitchcock appointed Butler as a "special agent for exchange of prisoners." While conducting these new exchanges, "the protection of the Government" would remain for "colored soldiers of the United States and the officers commanding them." Butler was to avoid "the question of parole and excess now pending" between the two sides. Within days, Butler started exchanging prisoners with the Confederates, and continued the transfers into the early months of 1864. Despite his original mandate, Butler tried to resolve the outstanding cartel issues with the rebel authorities while facing General Hitchcock's growing opposition over the scope and conduct of his activities.

Asked to review the situation in April 1864, Union General Ulysses S. Grant ordered the halt of all exchanges until the Confederates recognized "the validity of the paroles of the prisoners captured at Vicksburg and Port Hudson," and stopped discrimination against "colored soldiers."

In August 1864, Robert Ould accepted a Union proposal to make equal exchanges, "officer for officer and man for man" with the first releases going to those "longest in captivity." While Ould's offer circulated through Federal government, Butler wrote to Ould in September proposing a special exchange of all "sick and invalid officers and men . . . unfit for duty and likely to remain so for sixty days." To make the transfer easier, he proposed that the exchange occur at Fort Pulaski outside Savannah, Georgia. By the end of November, the belligerents had transferred several thousand prisoners near Savannah, and conducted a second transfer under similar terms in Charleston.

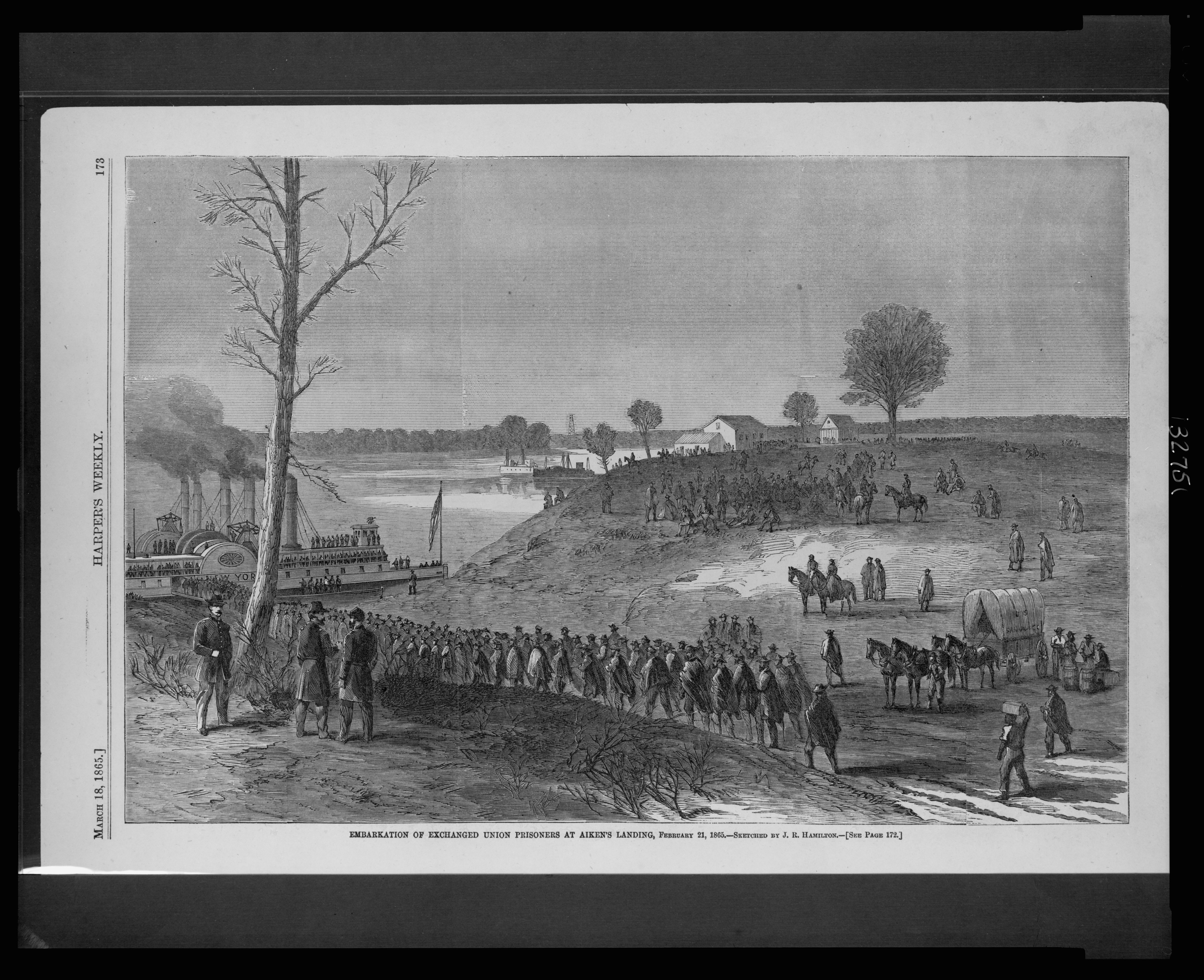
Embarkation of exchanged Union prisoners at Aiken's Landing, February 21, 1865

In January 1865 with the end of the war in sight, General Grant permitted the resumption of exchanges when the Confederate authorities agreed to include all prisoners. By February, Grant wrote to Secretary of War Stanton that he was trying to exchange 3000 prisoners a week, and requested that preference first go to disabled troops since "few of these will be got in the ranks again and as we can count upon but little reinforcement from the prisoners we get."

In his military history, The Longest Night, historian David J. Eicher states that the "Union Army paroled or exchanged 329,963 Confederate prisoners of war, while the Confederacy paroled or exchanged about 152,015 Union prisoners of war."

== The cartel's exchange officials ==
=== Confederate ===
- Robert Ould served as the official exchange agent for the Confederate government from 1862 to 1865.
- N. G. Watts assisted with prisoner exchanges at Vicksburg.
- Ignacy Szymański (1806–1874)

=== Union ===
The Union Army had several officers who became involved in the prisoner exchanges:

- Lorenzo Thomas, agent from July through September 1862.
- William H. Ludlow, agent from fall 1862 to summer 1863.
- Solomon A. Meredith, agent from summer 1863 until 1864
- Ethan Allen Hitchcock, agent starting in 1864
- John Elmer Mulford, assistant agent of exchange
- Benjamin F. Butler
- Charles C. Dwight
- Henry M. Lazelle, handled exchanges at Vicksburg.

== See also ==
- American Civil War prison camps
- Lieber Code: Orders for the conduct of Union forces signed by President Lincoln on April 24, 1863.
- Parole § Prisoners of war
