= Robert Louden =

American soldier

Robert Louden (some sources spell as Loudon or Lowden), also known by the alias Charlie Dale, was a Confederate saboteur and mail carrier during the American Civil War. He was said to be the primary messenger between General Sterling Price and Confederate regulars and bushwhackers.

As a Confederate agent, Louden was involved in the sabotage and sinking of several Union steamboats near St. Louis, Missouri and, on his deathbed, claimed to have been responsible for the destruction of the steamboat Sultana, which exploded on April 27, 1865 just north of Memphis, Tennessee, killing an estimated 1,300 to 1,900 paroled Union prisoners and civilians returning home after the war, the deadliest maritime disaster in United States history. Louden supposedly confessed to a man named William Streetor to have planted a coal torpedo, an artillery shell disguised to look like an innocuous lump of coal, in a coal pile used to fire the steamboat's boilers.

An article published May 7, 1888 in the New York Times refers to Louden's claim about the Sultana sinking:

"Yes, I know something about the Sultana disaster," said Mr. [William C.] Streeter in reply to an inquiry, "I can give the cause of the explosion. A torpedo inclosed (sic) in a lump of coal was carried aboard the steamer at Memphis and deposited in the coal pile in front of the boilers for the express purpose of causing her destruction. The man who placed the torpedo on the boat is my authority, for I had the statement from his own lips. He was a notorious Confederate mail carrier and blockade runner, was captured some five or six times, and once, at least, was sentenced to death by a military commission in this city." ... "It was after his return home that he told me the story of how he smuggled the torpedo on board the Sultana. His real name was Robert Lowden, but he was always known in this city by his alias, Charlie Dale." ... "He told me that he had fired no less than half a dozen steamboats on the Mississippi. I asked him in an off-hand way what we knew about the Sultana explosion. Then he told me the story of the torpedo in the coal, and, using his own expression, 'It had got to be too — ticklish a job to set a boat afire and get away from her.'"

The claim is controversial. Most modern scholars support the official explanation that the disaster was purely accidental, pointing out that the explosion occurred in the top rear of the boilers, relatively far from the fireboxes where a coal torpedo would have exploded, which suggests that Louden's story was fabricated.

Louden died of yellow fever in New Orleans, Louisiana on September 14, 1867, at the age of 37, and was buried at Greenwood Cemetery.
