= Joseph Garrera =

American historian

Joseph Garrera is an American historian, Abraham Lincoln expert, and museum professional. In 1997 Garrera concluded a year-long study of the Lincoln assassination flags. These are the American Flags that decorated the Presidential Box in Ford's Theatre the night Abraham Lincoln was assassinated. He concluded that one of the flags, a 36-star American Flag, was in the collections of the Pike County Historical Society in Milford, Pennsylvania. The story was carried by The New York Times on February 9, 1997.

Garrera was named Executive Director of the Lehigh Valley Heritage Museum in 2006, a position he held for eighteen years, concluding in 2025. Under Garrera’s direction, the Lehigh Valley Heritage Museum launched a series of exhibitions including “Abraham Lincoln and the Promise of America,” which was endorsed by the federal Abraham Lincoln Bicentennial Commission, as well as “Remembering World War II,” and “The American Spirit: The Paintings of Mort Künstler.". Garrera inaugurated the Heritage Museum’s extensive work with school cyber programs, a service the Museum introduced in 2020 because of the pandemic that is now a permanent part of the Museum’s portfolio of programs.

== Biography ==
Garrera earned a Master of Arts in History from East Stroudsburg University (2006) and a Bachelor of Arts in History from Thomas Edison State University (2004). He studied philanthropy at “The Center on Philanthropy” at Indiana University (2005).

Garrera was elected to the Abraham Lincoln Association Board of Directors in 2010, a position he continues to hold. From 1999 until 2010, he served as President of the Lincoln Group of New York in Manhattan, a nonprofit historical society that studies the life and times of Abraham Lincoln.

== Honors ==
- - Phi Alpha Theta, 2006: Attainments and Scholarship in History
- Selected to address the Pennsylvania House of Representatives with a lecture commemorating the 150th anniversary of Abraham Lincoln’s funeral train and funeral service in Harrisburg, Pennsylvania. Featured a one-day exhibit in the State Capitol on Abraham Lincoln at the invitation of Michael Turzai, Speaker of the House, 2015.
- Appointed to the Advisory Committee of the Federal Abraham Lincoln Bicentennial Commission, 2005. Served until its conclusion in 2009.
- Appointed to the New York State Abraham Lincoln Bicentennial Commission, 2006
