= Robert Ould =

Chief of the Bureau of Exchange for Confederate States of America

Colonel Robert Ould
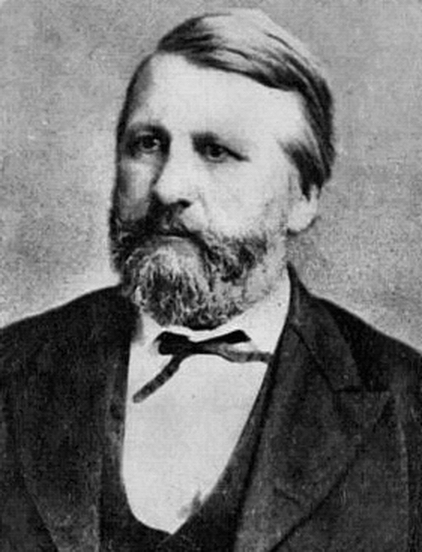
- Born: January 31, 1820; Georgetown, Washington, D.C.
- Died: December 15, 1882 (aged 62); Richmond, Virginia
- Burial place: Hollywood Cemetery; Richmond, Virginia
- Children: Mattie Ould Schoolcraft
- Military career
- Allegiance: Confederate States of America
- Branch: Confederate States Army
- Service years: 1862–1865 (CSA)
- Rank: Colonel (CSA)
- Commands: Commissioner of Exchange
- Conflicts: American Civil War

Robert Ould (January 31, 1820 – December 15, 1882) was a lawyer who served as a Confederate official during the American Civil War. From 1862 to 1865 he was the Confederate agent of exchange for prisoners of war under the Dix–Hill Cartel. After the war he became a member of the Virginia General Assembly and was later elected president of a railroad company.

== Early life ==
Ould was born in Georgetown, Washington, D.C., on January 31, 1820. After attending Jefferson College in Pennsylvania, he graduated in letters at Columbian College in D.C. in 1837, and in law at William & Mary College in 1842. During the antebellum period he worked as a lawyer in Washington, and in 1855 he was appointed under Franklin Pierce to a commission to codify the district's laws.

In 1859, following the shooting of Philip Barton Key II, Ould was appointed by James Buchanan to succeed Key as United States Attorney for the District of Columbia. Ould charged Key's killer, Daniel E. Sickles, with murder, but lost the case after Sickles' lawyer (and future United States Secretary of War) Edwin M. Stanton invoked one of the first uses of the temporary insanity defense in U.S. history.

== Civil War ==
Ould was also a brigadier general in the District of Columbia militia; in his role as United States Attorney, he advised Buchanan not to arm newly raised Unionist militia companies in the District. Following the secession of Virginia in 1861, Ould decided to support the Confederacy and moved with his family to Richmond. Early in the war he was appointed to the War Department as Assistant Secretary of War, serving under Judah P. Benjamin.

In July 1862 Ould was appointed as the chief agent of exchange under the terms of the Dix–Hill Cartel, with the rank of colonel. In this position he was responsible for negotiating the exchange and treatment of prisoners of war with his Union counterparts. He held the office for most of the remainder of the war, until he was succeeded by William Norris in April 1865. During the war he also served as judge advocate in Richmond and seems to have been a high-ranking official in the Confederate Secret Service.

== Postwar career ==
After the surrender at Appomattox in 1865, Ould was arrested and briefly incarcerated at Libby Prison on charges of misappropriating funds belonging to Union prisoners, but was soon after released, and on October 30 he received a pardon from Andrew Johnson. He subsequently defended former Confederate president Jefferson Davis against charges of treason.

After the war, Ould remained in Richmond and returned to practicing law. In 1866 he was elected to one term in the Virginia Senate, and from 1874 to 1875 he served as a representative for Richmond in the House of Delegates. In 1878 he was elected president of the Richmond, Fredericksburg and Potomac Railroad Company.

Ould died on January 15, 1882, and was buried at Hollywood Cemetery in Richmond.
