= Explosive rat =

Weapon developed during World War II

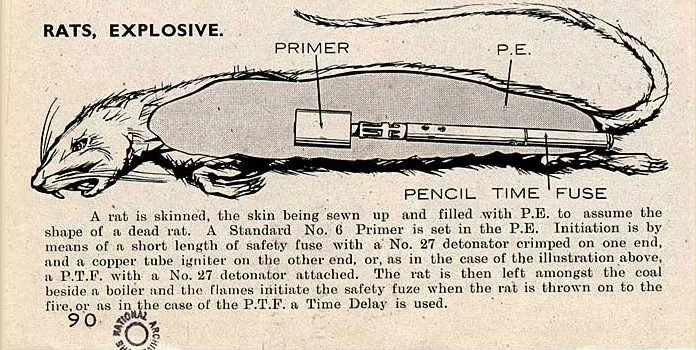
Diagram and instructions for creating explosive rats

The explosive rat, also known as a rat bomb, was a weapon developed by the British Special Operations Executive (SOE) in World War II for use against Germany. Rat carcasses were filled with plastic explosives, and were to be distributed near German boiler rooms where it was expected they would be disposed of by burning, with the subsequent explosion having a chance of causing a boiler explosion.

The explosive rats never saw use, as the first shipment was intercepted by the Germans; however, the resulting search for more booby trapped rats consumed enough German resources for the SOE to conclude that the operation was a success.

== Development ==
During World War II, the British Special Operations Executive (SOE) procured about a hundred rodents, ostensibly for medical experiments. The rodents were killed and plastic explosives were sewn inside them.

The idea, developed in 1941, was that when the dead rat was discovered in the boiler room of a locomotive, factory, power station, or similar installation, the stoker tending the boiler would dispose of the unpleasant discovery by shoveling it into the furnace, causing the booby trapped rat to explode. A rat could contain only a small amount of explosive; however, a penetration of a highly pressurized steam boiler could trigger a devastating boiler explosion. A rat bomb could also be set with a delayed fuse.

== Operational history ==
The first shipment of carcasses was intercepted by the Germans, and the SOE plan was dropped. The Germans exhibited the rats at top military schools and conducted searches for further exploding rats. The SOE concluded: "The trouble caused to them was a much greater success to us than if the rats had actually been used."

A biography of Station IX officer J. Elder Wills claims that nine boilers were damaged in Belgian factories by the rats but is probably a myth.

== See also ==
- Anti-tank dog
- Bat bomb
- Coal torpedoes
- Military animals
