= William Norris (Confederate signal officer) =

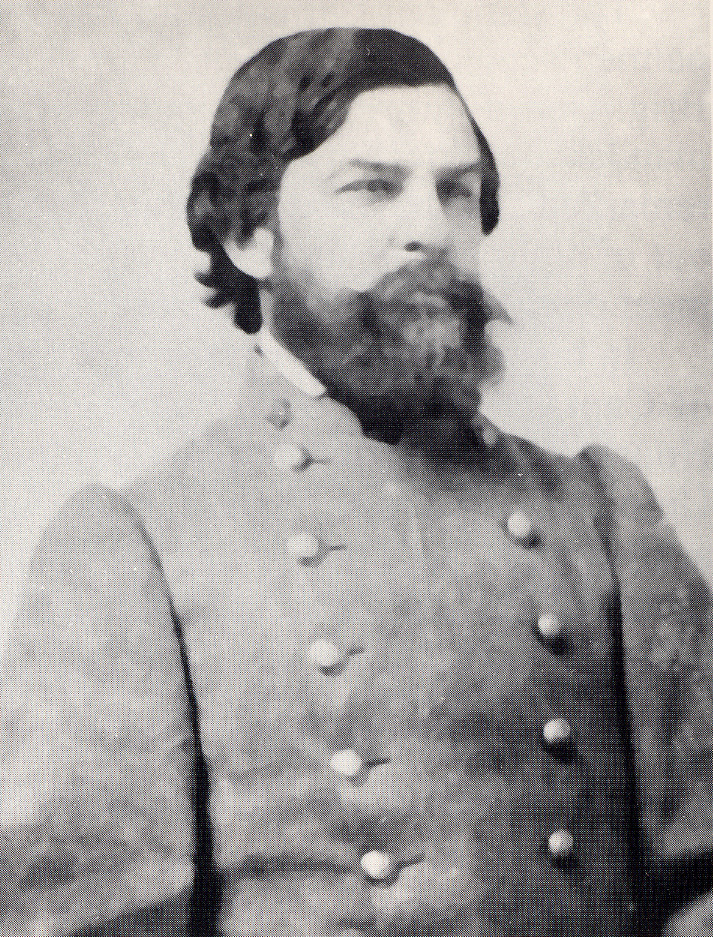
- Born: December 6, 1820; Baltimore County, Maryland
- Died: December 29, 1896 (aged 76)
- Spouse: Ellen Lyles Hobson
- Children: Richard Norris
- Military career
- Allegiance: Confederate States of America
- Branch: Confederate States Army
- Service years: 1861–1865
- Rank: Colonel
- Commands: Chief Signal Officer of the CSA; Commissioner of Prisoner Exchange
- Conflicts: American Civil War

William Norris (December 6, 1820 – December 29, 1896) was the Chief Signal Officer of the Confederate States Army and Chief of the Signal Bureau in Richmond. He is often confused with Dr. William S. Morris, president of the wartime Southern Telegraph Company. He is often referred to as Major, but he attained the rank of Colonel in the closing days of the war.

== Early life ==
William Norris was born December 6, 1820, in Baltimore County, Maryland. He graduated from Yale College in 1840 at the age of nineteen and went to New Orleans to practice law. He headed to California during the 1849 Gold Rush. After his arrival he was appointed Judge Advocate to the United States Pacific Squadron.

He sailed to Valparaíso, Chile in 1851 and on March 13, 1851, he married Ellen Lyles Hobson of Baltimore, a daughter of a former United States consul. After the wedding, Norris returned with his bride to the family estate, Brookland, near Reisterstown, northwest of Baltimore. He and his wife had a son, named Richard, in 1852. In 1858, he became the president of the Baltimore Mechanical Bakery, an ultramodern establishment on South Howard near Pratt Street.

== Civil War ==
In the winter of 1860-61 pro-Confederate sentiment was strong in Baltimore. On the 18th and 19 April 1861, the Pratt Street Riot took place in Baltimore. Norris made no secret of his southern sympathies and with the outbreak of war he and his family left for Virginia. There he volunteered as a civilian aide on the staff of Brigadier General John Bankhead Magruder.

After Magruder sent Norris to learn signals in Norfolk under Captain Milligan, Milligan gave Norris a book of his system of signals and On July 18. 1861, Magruder gave Norris authority to establish a system of signals on the Peninsula and across the James River. Norris set up a network which employed flags and colored balls raised on poles. Due to his efforts on the signal system Norris was commissioned as a captain.

Norris also commanded the Secret Service Bureau, a unit within the Signal Corps. The Secret Service Bureau oversaw a communications network whose missions included the running of agents to and from Union territory and the forwarding of messages from Confederate officials in Richmond to contacts in Canada and Europe.

William Norris finally achieved the rank of colonel on April 26, 1865, and became the Commissioner of Exchange (of prisoners of war) replacing Colonel Robert Ould. Within a week Norris was in Union hands. Norris was held in detention in Richmond but eventually cleared of charge. On June 30, 1865, Norris swore allegiance to the United States.

== After the war ==
Norris and his family returned to Brookline near Reisterstown. After the war Norris considered going to Chile to set up a signal corps for the military there. In 1866 Norris wrote a letter to the lawyer defending John H. Surratt from complicity in the Lincoln assassination. Norris absolved Surratt of any involvement and offered to testify in his behalf. In 1874 his eyewitness account of the USS Monitor and CSS Virginia battle was published in the Southern Magazine.

== Death ==
Norris died of a stroke on December 29, 1896, and is buried in the All Saints’ Cemetery in Reisterstown, Maryland.
