= Thomas Courtney =

Thomas Courtney may refer to:

- Thomas G. Courtney (born 1947), Iowa state senator
- Thomas J. Courtney (1892–1971), Illinois state senator
- Tom Courtney (born 1933), American athlete

== See also ==
- Thomas Courtenay (disambiguation)
