= 3rd Tennessee Cavalry Regiment =

- Active: January 27, 1863, to August 3, 1865
- Country: United States
- Allegiance: Union
- Branch: Cavalry
- Engagements: Battle of Stones River; Tullahoma Campaign; Battle of Nashville

The 3rd Tennessee Cavalry Regiment was a cavalry regiment that served in the Union Army during the American Civil War.

== Service ==
The 3rd Tennessee Cavalry was organized at Murfreesboro and Nashville, Tennessee and mustered in for a three-year enlistment on January 27, 1863, under the command of Colonel William C. Pickens and saw action at the battle of Stones River before being officially mustered.

The regiment was attached to 4th Division, Center, XIV Corps, Department of the Cumberland, November 1862 to January 1863. Post of Nashville, Tennessee, Department of the Cumberland, to June 1863. 2nd Brigade, 1st Cavalry Division, Army of the Cumberland, to August 1863. Post of Nashville, Tennessee, Department of the Cumberland, to January 1864. 3rd Brigade, Cavalry Division, XVI Corps, Department of the Tennessee, to April 1864. 1st Brigade, 4th Division, Cavalry Corps, Army of the Cumberland, to June 1864. District of North Alabama, Department of the Cumberland, to October 1864. 1st Brigade, 4th Division, Cavalry Corps, Military Division Mississippi, to November 1864. 2nd Brigade, 6th Division, Cavalry Corps, Military Division Mississippi and District Middle Tennessee, to August 1865.

The 3rd Tennessee Cavalry mustered out of service at Nashville, Tennessee, on August 3, 1865.

== Detailed service ==
Guard trains from Nashville to Murfreesboro, Tenn., January 2–3, 1863. Battle of Stones River January 3. Expedition to Franklin January 31-February 13. Middletown and Hover January 31. Rover February 13. At Camp Spear, Nashville, until June. Near Murfreesboro March 22. Tullahoma Campaign June 23-July 7. Duty at Nashville until December 1863. Operations about Dandridge and Mossy Creek December 24–28. Expedition to Memphis, Tenn., December 28-January 4, 1864. Moved to Colliersville January 14. Smith's Expedition to Okolona, Miss., February 11–26. Pontotoc February 17. Okolona February 18. Egypt Station February 19. West Point February 20–21. Ivy's Hill or Okolona February 22. Near New Albany February 22. Ordered to Nashville, Tenn., February 27, and duty there until June. Duty on line of Nashville & Chattanooga Railroad and in the District of North Alabama about Decatur, Ala. until September. Operations in District of North Alabama June 24-August 20. Scout in Morgan and Lawrence Counties July (detachment). Expedition from Decatur to Courtland and Moulton and skirmish July 25–28. Courtland July 28. Summerville Road near Decatur August 6 (detachment). Near Pond Springs August 9. Expedition from Decatur to Moulton August 17–20. Near Antioch Church August 18–19. Florence September 10. Operations against Forrest September 16–25. Action at Athens September 23–24 (detachment), captured. Action at Sulphur Branch Trestle September 25 with most of the regiment captured. Duty on Nashville and Chattanooga Railroad until December. At Decatur, Pulaski and Nashville. Joined Brigade at Nashville, Tenn., December 13. Battle of Nashville December 15–16. On post duty at Nashville until August 1865.

== Casualties ==
The regiment lost a total of 546 men during service; 2 officers and 8 enlisted men killed or mortally wounded, 4 officers and 532 enlisted men died of disease or accident.

Many of those captured at Sulphur Branch Trestle were sent to Cahawba Prison in Alabama and paroled in April 1865. The parolees were then sent to Vicksburg, where they embarked on the ill-fated steamboat Sultana. Over 260 soldiers of the 3rd Tennessee died in the Sultana disaster on April 27, 1865. Their names are listed on the Sultana monument in Mount Olive Cemetery in Knox County, TN. "http://www.tngenweb.org/civilwar/cemeteries/sultana.html"

== Commanders ==
- Colonel William C. Pickens
- Major Benjamin Cunningham - commanded at the battle of Nashville

== See also ==
- List of Tennessee Civil War units
- Tennessee in the Civil War
