= Mattie Ould Schoolcraft =

American socialite

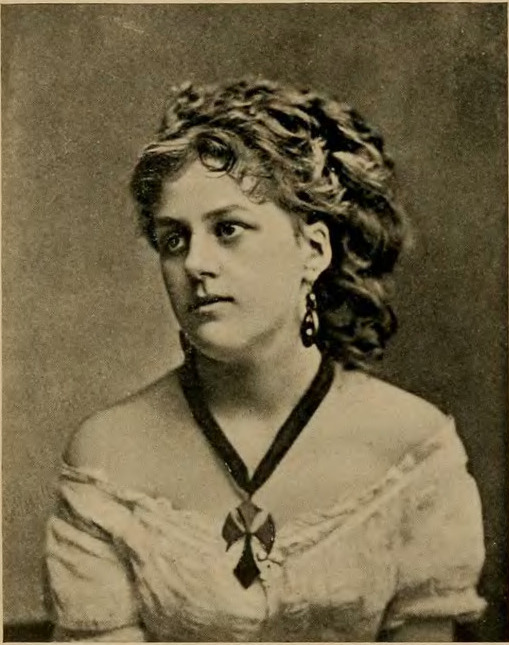
- Mattie Ould Schoolcraft, from a 1901 publication
- Born: Martha Gwynn Ould; 1850 or 1851
- Died: April 23, 1877 (age 26); Henrico County, Virginia, U.S.
- Spouse: Oliver J. Schoolcraft
- Father: Robert Ould

Mattie Ould Schoolcraft (about 1850 – 1877), born Martha Gwynn Ould, was an American society "belle" in Richmond, Virginia, after the American Civil War. Her sudden marriage, and her death in childbirth about eight months later, were national news, and her photograph was reprinted for decades afterward.

== Biography ==
Ould was the daughter of Robert Ould and Sarah Augusta Turpin Ould. Her father was a lawyer, a judge, and an official of the Confederate States of America during the American Civil War. Her mother was a close friend to Varina Davis.

Ould was a society "belle", known for her wit, conversational skills, and beauty. She was said to be informally engaged to a tobacco merchant. While she was staying the summer at White Sulfur Springs, Ould met a New York-born newspaper owner and editor Oliver J. Schoolcraft, son of Congressman John L. Schoolcraft. They married suddenly in August 1876, without announcing their intentions even to their families. Schoolcraft inherited "a comfortable fortune", according to The Baltimore Sun, but "is not credited with having much brains, and is considered in every way inferior to his spouse," explained The Boston Globe.

The Schoolcrafts sailed for Europe on honeymoon. She died in childbirth in April 1877, in her mid-twenties, near Richmond. "Richmond had never seen such a sight as Mattie Ould's funeral," recalled the Richmond TImes-Dispatch in 1900.

Oliver Schoolcraft's second marriage was also brief. Ould's story and image were reprinted for decades after her death, sometimes as an illustration of "the fatality that attends the gift of beauty". An 1871 miniature portrait of Ould is in the collection of The Valentine, a museum in Richmond.
