= Catherine Virginia Baxley =

Confederate spy

Catherine Virginia Baxley was a Confederate spy during the American Civil War. Baxley worked with infamous spy Rose Greenhow were imprisoned on December 30, 1861, and deported back to the Confederate States in 1862. Later, Baxley continued being a blockade runner for the Confederacy during the civil war. She was arrested again while getting off a boat from Baltimore, Maryland and became a union prisoner. She was one of the first women confined in the Old Capital Prison, Washington, D.C. from February 24-July 2, 1865 where she was transferred after originally being held at Fort Greenhow. Like John Surratt, Baxley was a courier and carried letters across the union blockade.

Baxley's son, a 17-year-old Confederate soldier, was also imprisoned at Old Capital Prison. The teenager had joined the Confederacy at 16. He arrived at the prison wounded after Baxley had already been captured for quite some time. His wounds were reportedly minor, but he was taken to the hospital infirmary. He eventually developed typhoid fever and died due to the conditions of the prison. Baxley reportedly attempted to get the guards to give better food to the boy, as a result she was removed from his side and the boy died soon after in Mary Surratt's arms.

== The letters ==
According to the United States War Department, Baxley was caught carrying letters to General Winder, Mr. Benjamin, Dr. Septimus Brown, Jefferson Davies, President of the Confederate States among other Confederate leaders. She had numerous letters concealed among her person. Baxley was coming from Richmond, VA.

== Baxley's personal writings ==
She wrote letters to exaggerate gender stereotypes to try to get herself released. Reportedly one week after her initial imprisonment she wrote a letter to Secretary of State Steward claiming she was a silly, innocent woman incapable of espionage. She wrote, "I carried with me nothing in the world but a few friendly letters...Liberate me, for god's sake...I shall die here." Baxley thus represented herself to the union as a well-intentioned, politically naive woman.

Baxley also kept a journal during her time in prison. This journal seemed to serve the purpose of expressing her thoughts, turmoils, and emotions after being captured and watching the death of her son. The diary expresses a forceful discontent with the North.

== Notable writings on Baxley ==
=== Rose Greenhow ===
Greenhow frequently discussed her disdain for Baxley. Greenhow believed Baxley had overstepped acceptable codes of female conduct, namely that she had unladylike manners.

Greenhow also kept a journal and documented various moments of tension between the two women. In one excerpt, Greenhow described guards who wanted to lead the three women, Greenhow, Baxley and Ms. Morris through a dirty back stairway. In disagreement, Greenhow attempted to explain that she would like to go in their usual route. Baxley and Morris then attempted to go down the usual route despite the guards' orders, and attempted to push their way past the guards. To Greenhow's horror, Baxley grabbed the guards' muskets and attempted to duck under it. The guard cursed at Baxley and she then punched the guard in the face, giving him a nosebleed. The guard then pushed Baxley and kicked her. Greenhow even wrote she was humiliated to be associated with Baxley, citing this occurrence.

Some theorists, however, think that Greenhow knew that Union members would read her writings and Greenhow thus deliberately downplayed their work together.

=== Virginia Lomax ===
Virginia Lomax wrote that Baxley, "Said and did whatever she pleased." According to Lomax, Baxley was witty and she constantly vexed the guards with her sarcasm.

=== Morris ===
Mary Morris reportedly voiced fears that Baxley could be a counterspy for the North. Thus adding to the perspective that Morris, Greenhow, and Baxley—while all in support of the confederacy, disliked each other considerably.

=== John L. Brown ===
Brown wrote that Baxley had bragged to him about transporting 200 guns to the Southern Army.
