= Coal torpedo =

Bomb intended to sabotage steam engines

A coal torpedo. This example was prepared as a model, with a partial coal dust coating and the plug left out. It was found in Jefferson Davis' office by Union General Edward Ripley when Union forces captured Richmond in April 1865.

The coal torpedo was a hollow iron casting filled with explosives and covered in coal dust, deployed by the Confederate Secret Service during the American Civil War, and intended for doing harm to Union steam transportation. When it was shoveled into the firebox amongst the coal, the resulting explosion would at the very least damage the boiler and render the engines inoperable. At worst, a catastrophic boiler explosion would kill crewmen and passengers, start a fire, or even sink the vessel.

== Development ==
Thomas Courtenay in the uniform of a Confederate Army captain.

The coal torpedo was invented by Captain Thomas Edgeworth Courtenay of the Confederate Secret Service. During the Civil War, the term torpedo was used to indicate a wide range of explosive devices including what are now called land mines, naval mines, improvised explosive devices, and booby traps. Northern newspapers referred to Courtenay's coal bombs as torpedoes, or sometimes "infernal machines"; Courtenay himself called it his "coal shell".

The torpedoes were manufactured at the 7th Avenue Artillery shop (across the street from Tredegar Iron Works) in Richmond, Virginia, in January 1864. The manufacturing process was similar to that used for artillery shells, except that actual pieces of coal were used as patterns for iron castings. The walls of the coal shell were about 0.75 inches (1.9 cm) thick, creating a hollow space inside sufficient to hold 3–4 ounces (85–113 g) of gunpowder. After filling, the shell was closed with a threaded plug, then dipped in melted beeswax and rolled in coal dust, creating the appearance of a lump of coal. Finished coal torpedoes were about 4 inches (10 cm) on a side and weighed 3 to 4 pounds (1.4 to 1.8 kg).

The size and powder charge of the coal torpedo was similar to a 6-pound (2.7 kg) shrapnel shell or the equivalent of three Civil War-era hand grenades. The explosion of a coal torpedo under a ship's boiler would not by itself be sufficient to sink the vessel. The purpose of the coal torpedo was to burst the pressurized steam boiler, which had the potential to trigger an extremely destructive boiler explosion. Accidental boiler explosions were not uncommon in the early years of steam transportation and could result in the complete destruction of the vessel by fire. In use, the coal torpedo would leave little evidence that a boiler explosion was due to sabotage.

== Deployment ==
The sidewheeler Greyhound.

Courtenay was authorized to form a company of men to infiltrate enemy lines and place coal torpedoes in the coal piles used to fuel Union steam ships. It was especially intended to be used against ships of the Union blockade, although Courtenay was authorized to act against any Union military or commercial shipping in Confederate waters. Although the Union blockade and other forms of military shipping were Courtenay's primary targets, he also had plans to use the coal torpedo to attack steam locomotives, although no confirmed attacks are known to have been made.

On 19 March 1864, a Union gunboat captured a rebel courier crossing the Mississippi, carrying a letter from Courtenay describing the coal torpedo. The correspondence was forwarded to Admiral David Porter, who immediately issued his General Order 184, which began

The enemy have adopted new inventions to destroy human life and vessels in the shape of torpedoes, and an article resembling coal, which is to be placed in our coal piles for the purpose of blowing the vessels up, or injuring them. Officers will have to be careful in overlooking coal barges. Guards will be placed over them at all times, and anyone found attempting to place any of these things amongst the coal will be shot on the spot.

In April 1865, most of the official papers of the Confederate Secret Service were burned by Secretary of State Judah P. Benjamin just before the government evacuated Richmond, making it impossible to determine with any certainty how many ships were destroyed by Courtenay's shell. Union Admiral Porter credited the coal torpedo with sinking the Greyhound, a private steamboat that had been commandeered by General Benjamin F. Butler for use as a floating headquarters on the James River. Courtenay also took credit for the boiler explosion on the gunboat USS Chenango that scalded 33 men (28 fatally), though the vessel itself survived and was repaired and returned to duty. In the spring of 1865, Canadian customs raided a house in Toronto that had been rented by Jacob Thompson, one of the commissioners of the Confederate Secret Service stationed in Canada. They found coal torpedoes and other incendiary devices hidden under the floorboards.

On April 27, 1865, the sidewheel steamboat Sultana exploded her boilers just above Memphis, TN while carrying almost 2,000 Union prisoners of war home to the North. 1,196 people died. Within a few days, the first mate, who had failed to redistribute the weight on the top-heavy boat once a large load of supplies was removed from the hold, claimed that the Sultana was exploded by a coal torpedo. Three investigative bodies looked into the possibility and refuted it. In 1888, a former Union prison guard claimed that a Confederate mail-carrier named Robert Louden had told him years before that he had used a coal torpedo to sink the steamboat. The mail carrier was long dead and unable to answer questions. Many Sultana survivors and other experts immediately refuted the idea. Captain Thomas Edgeworth Courtenay never claimed the sinking of the Sultana by a coal torpedo. Although the coal torpedo sabotage theory remains popular, it is refuted by most experts.

== After the Civil War ==
Courtenay had traveled to England in 1864 and remained there until 1867, trying to sell the "secret" of the coal torpedo to foreign governments. He approached the British War Office, but they turned him down after he would not agree to allow them to examine his invention before purchasing it. When Courtenay returned to the United States, one or more business partners to whom he had entrusted the secret remained in England. The Times in 1873 reported rumors that disreputable ship owners were purchasing coal torpedoes to put in their own ships as a form of insurance fraud, so that over-insured ships and cargo would sink while far out at sea, leaving no evidence. Other reports scoffed at the rumors, suggesting they were false stories planted by supporters of Samuel Plimsoll, a Member of Parliament who was trying to pass a bill reforming the shipping industry. Nothing was ever proven, but the reports stirred up popular interest in various supposed methods of sabotaging ships, and the coal torpedo even made an appearance in the short story, "That Little Square Box", by Arthur Conan Doyle, published in the collection The Captain of the Polestar and Other Tales in 1890.

Various forms of exploding coal, whether directly descended from Courtenay's original idea or independently developed, have surfaced multiple times throughout history.

The Fenian Brotherhood, an Irish nationalist organization operating in the United States in the late 1860s–1870s, reportedly considered placing coal torpedoes in the furnaces of New York City hotels as well as English transatlantic steamships. They were a strong suspect in the destruction of the warship HMS Doterel at Punta Arenas in 1881, but later evidence proved the explosion was accidental. During the Russo-Japanese War, Russia's French naval attaché came into possession of coals that been hollowed out with the appearance that they could have been filled with explosives and used to attack the Russian fleet.

Both the American OSS and the British SOE used forms of exploding coal in World War II. The German commandos who came ashore on Long Island in 1942 as part of Operation Pastorius carried plastic explosives disguised as coal for use against coal-fired electric generating plants. Such a German coal torpedo was given to the British double agent Eddie Chapman (also known as "Agent Zig-Zag") to sabotage the merchant ship City of Lancaster, but he passed it on to his MI5 handler instead. Similar devices were also made by the Japanese during World War II.

Stanley Karnow hints in his book Vietnam: A History that the CIA prepared explosive coal for use against North Vietnamese railways during the Vietnam War.

== See also ==
- Bat bomb
- Explosive rat
- Improvised explosive device
- Project Eldest Son
