= Edward Steers Jr. =

American historian (born 1937)

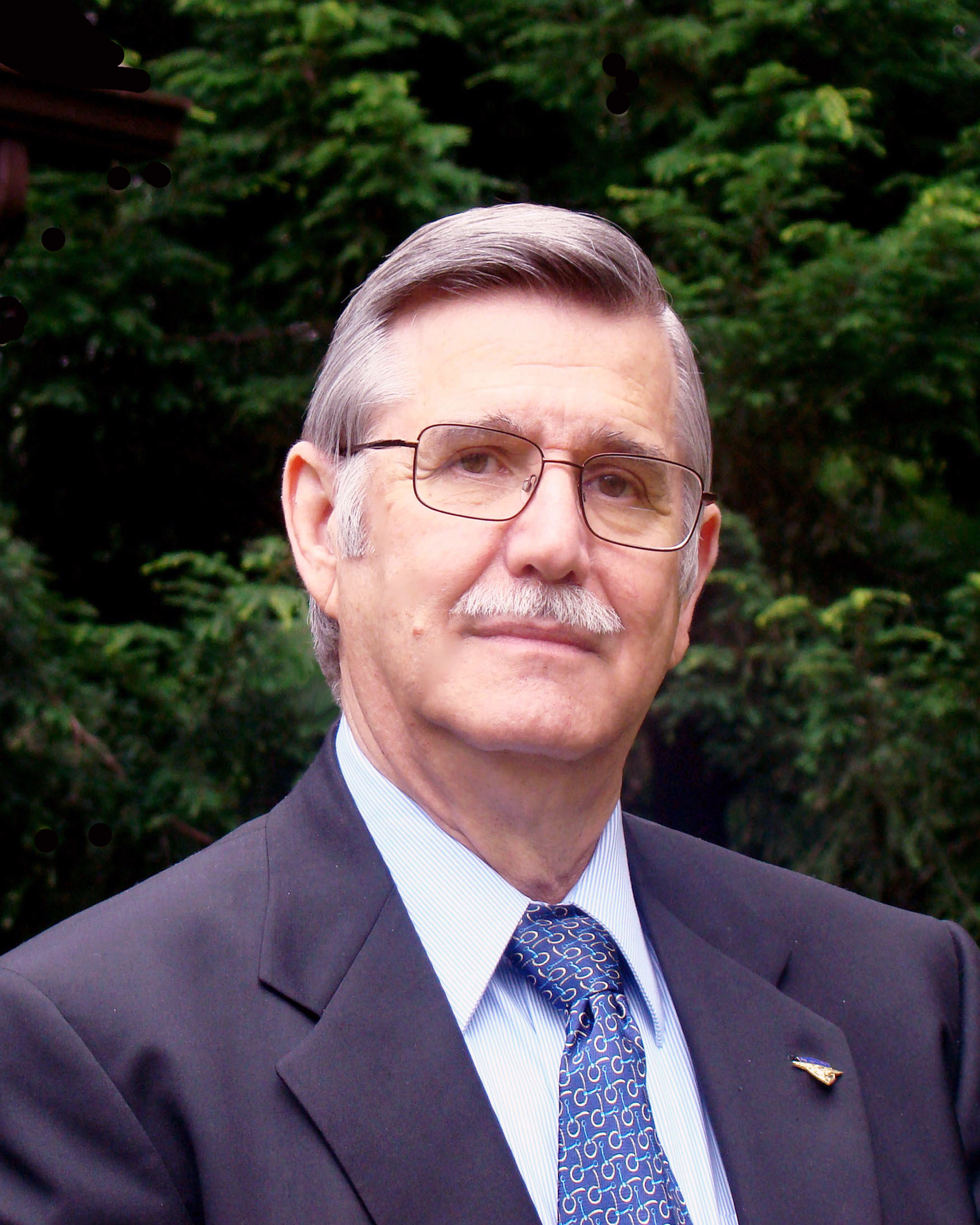
Edward Steers Jr.

Edward Steers Jr. is an American scientist and historian. He is an authority on U.S. President Abraham Lincoln and has received awards in both the fields of scientific research and history.

== Career ==
Born in Bethlehem, Pennsylvania, Edward Steers gained an early appreciation for science by attending classes as a young boy taught by his father, who headed the Science Department at Moravian College. Steers received his AB degree in Microbiology in 1959 and his PhD in Molecular Biology in 1963 from the University of Pennsylvania in Philadelphia and joined the staff of the National Institutes of Health (1963–1994). Recruited out of graduate school by Nobel Laureate (Chemistry) Christian B. Anfinsen, Steers learned his research skills working alongside one of the world's leading biochemists. From 1966 to 1986 Steers served as an adjunct professor in the Department of Biochemistry at the George Washington University School of Medicine. From 1984 to 1994 he served as the Deputy Scientific Director for Intramural Research in the National Institute of Diabetes and Digestive Diseases and Kidney Diseases.

After his retirement in 1994, Steers turned his research skills to full-time writing in the field of history. He has published numerous articles and more than 26 books, including titles on topics as diverse as WWII and Abraham Lincoln. Steers is also fascinated by dissecting fraudulent claims appearing in popular history, publishing books such as Hoax, Lincoln Legends: Myths, Hoaxes, and Confabulations Associated With Our Greatest President, and Getting Right with Lincoln: Correcting Misconceptions about our Greatest President.

Edward Steers is recognized as a leading authority on Abraham Lincoln and his assassination. He has authored or edited more than a dozen books on Lincoln's life and death, including Lincoln, The Quotable Lincoln, Blood on the Moon, The Lincoln Assassination Conspirators, His Name is Still Mudd, The Trial, The Lincoln Assassination: The Evidence, Lincoln Legends, and The Lincoln Assassination Encyclopedia. His book Blood on the Moon alleges that the Confederate Secret Service was intimately involved with John Wilkes Booth ultimately leading to the assassination of President Lincoln. His book His Name Is Still Mudd presents the case for Dr. Samuel Mudd's complicity with John Wilkes Booth's plot to capture President Lincoln ultimately leading to his assassination.

Among his honors, Steers was elected to American Men and Women of Science, and as a Fellow in the Company of Military Historians. He served as Review Editor for the Lincoln Herald, and he is an Associate Editor of North & South magazine. Steers was appointed to the West Virginia Abraham Lincoln Bicentennial Commission (appointed by Governor Joe Manchin) and the Abraham Lincoln Bicentennial Commission Advisory Board (appointed by Senator Richard Durbin). For his historical writing Steers was awarded the Lincoln Group of New York's "Award of Achievement", the Lincoln Group of the District of Columbia's "Man of the Year Award", and The Lincoln Forum's "Richard Nelson Current Award of Achievement".

== Books ==
External videos
- Booknotes interview with Steers on Blood on the Moon, February 17, 2002, C-SPAN
- Presentation by Steers on Blood on the Moon, March 16, 2002, C-SPAN
- Presentation by Steers on The Trial: The Assassination of President Lincoln, November 17, 2005, C-SPAN
- Presentation by Steers on The Lincoln Assassination Encyclopedia, April 24, 2010, C-SPAN

Steers is the author of a number of books, including:

- Blood on the Moon: The Assassination of Abraham Lincoln. University Press of Kentucky. 2001. ISBN 0813122171.
- Der Tagebuch: The Journal. Independently published. 2020. ISBN 9781719935203.
- Don't You Know There's a War On?: Life on the Home Front during World War II. Sign of the Ox. 2007. ISBN 9781577471288.
- The Escape and Capture of John Wilkes Booth. Thomas Publications. 1992. ISBN 0939631490.
- Essays in History. CreateSpace Independent Publishing Platform. 2015. ISBN 9781508461449.
- Forgotten History: Lost to Time, Interesting Events in History. CreateSpace Independent Publishing Platform. 2016. ISBN 9781537687704.
- From Port Hudson to Cedar Creek: The Civil War Letters of Charles Washington Kennedy. CreateSpace Independent Publishing Platform. 2014. ISBN 9781505708073.
- Getting Right With Lincoln: Correcting Misconceptions About Our Greatest President. University Press of Kentucky. 2021. ISBN 9780813180908.
- His Name is Still Mudd: The Case against Doctor Samuel Alexander Mudd. Thomas Publications. 1997. ISBN 1577470192.
- Hoax. Hitler's Diaries, Lincoln's Assassins, and other Famous Frauds. University Press of Kentucky. 2013. ISBN 978-0-8131-4159-6.
- I'll Be Seeing You: Love and Intrigue in the Midst of War. CreateSpace Independent Publishing Platform. 2015. ISBN 9781511551069.
- The Lincoln Assassination Encyclopedia. Harper Perennial. 2010. ISBN 9780061787751.
- The Lincoln Assassination. The Evidence. University of Illinois Press. 2009. ISBN 9780252033681.
- Lincoln: A Pictorial History. Thomas Publications. 1993. ISBN 9780939631667.
- Lincoln Legends: Myths, Hoaxes, and Confabulations Associated with Our Greatest President. University Press of Kentucky. 2007. ISBN 9780813124667.
- Lincoln Slept Here: Lincoln Family Sites in America, The Early Ancestors 1637-1808. CreateSpace Independent Publishing Platform. 2016. ISBN 9781523237944.
- Lincoln Slept Here: Lincoln Family Sites in America, Illinois Years 1830-1861. CreateSpace Independent Publishing Platform. 2016. ISBN 9781718710504.
- Lincoln Slept Here: Lincoln Family Sites in America, the Kentucky Years 1809-1816, Indiana Years 1816-1830. CreateSpace Independent Publishing Platform. 2017. ISBN 9781544037493.
- The Trial: The Assassination of President Lincoln and the Trial of the Conspirators. University Press of Kentucky. 2003. ISBN 0813122775.
- Lincoln's Assassination. Southern Illinois University Press. 2014. ISBN 9780809333493.
- The "Quotable" Lincoln: A Selection From the Writings of Abraham Lincoln. Independently published. 2019. ISBN 1073562654.
- Rationing During WWII. Independently published. 2021. ISBN 9798512883761.
- Edward Steers, Jr. and Harold Holzer, ed. (2009). The Lincoln Assassination Conspirators: Their Confinement and Execution, as Recorded in the Letterbook of John Frederick Hartranft. Louisiana State University Press. ISBN 978-0-8071-3396-5.
