= Thomas Edgeworth Courtenay =

Confederate spy

Thomas Edgeworth Courtenay (19 April 1822 – 3 September 1875) was a member of the Confederate Secret Service and the inventor of the coal torpedo, a bomb disguised as a lump of coal that was used to attack Union steam-powered warships and transports.

== Birth and early life ==
Portrait of Thomas Edgeworth Courtenay about 1844 (age 22)

Thomas Edgeworth Courtenay was born in Belfast, Ireland, the youngest of 6 children. He was distantly related to the Courtenay family who held the title Earls of Devon and were seated at Powderham Castle in Exeter, and was a distant cousin to the novelist Maria Edgeworth, but his own family was not well-to-do. His oldest brother inherited the family property and his other siblings had all come to America to seek a better life. Courtenay came to the United States in 1842, first staying with his brother William in Vicksburg, Mississippi, before settling down in St. Louis, Missouri. He and his brother were brokers, shipping supplies down the Mississippi River to plantation owners, and buying their cotton for shipment to England. Thomas also established himself as an insurance agent, selling fire, marine, and life insurance from an office at the corner of Main and Olive streets in St. Louis.

In January 1860, Courtenay was appointed sheriff of St. Louis county to fill out the term of Sheriff Cere, who had died in office. The office dealt mainly with civil matters such as foreclosures and sheriff's sales. Courtenay did not run for election to a full term as sheriff and was out of office by the end of August. When he left office, there was a significant shortfall in the books of the sheriff's office. Courtenay blamed the problem on his chief deputy, but the matter was Courtenay's responsibility, and the unresolved debt put a damper on his business efforts. When the Civil War broke out, he moved his family to relatives in Harford County, Maryland and established a new insurance office in Baltimore.

== The Civil War ==
Thomas Courtenay in the uniform of a Confederate Army Captain.

In 1863 Courtenay returned to St. Louis to pursue a lawsuit against his former deputy for recovery of the funds missing from the sheriff's office. It became clear that the suit was hopeless and that he would be held financially responsible. Moreover, the Union authorities were suspicious that Courtenay was a rebel sympathizer, due to his business dealings in the South. In fact, Courtenay was a Confederate sympathizer, and had written to Confederate Secretary of War Leroy Pope Walker in May 1861, offering to act as a purchasing agent for Confederate supplies in the Trans-Mississippi Department.

With no prospect of recovering his business in St. Louis and his family well cared for in Maryland, Courtenay turned to the Confederacy. He obtained a volunteer appointment to General Sterling Price's staff, although exactly what he was doing is unknown.

In August 1863, Courtenay approached Price with a plan to attack Union shipping by means of an explosive device disguised as a lump of coal, the coal torpedo. The coal bombs would be planted in the coal piles used to fuel Union steamships and locomotives by a team of operatives working behind enemy lines. When a coal bomb was shovelled into the firebox, it would explode, resulting in the explosion of the pressurized steam boiler and the destruction of the vessel. Courtenay was sent to Richmond, Virginia carrying military dispatches, and he remained in Richmond to implement his plan. He first wrote to Confederate President Jefferson Davis on 30 November 1863, explaining his scheme. Davis approved and forwarded Courtenay's letter to Secretary of War James A. Seddon, who arranged for the castings to be made by the army artillery shop in January 1864.

Courtenay was motivated by a Confederate Bounty Law that offered a reward of up to 50% of the value of Union shipping destroyed by means of new inventions. However, the Confederacy had not established a legal framework that would allow private citizens to conduct attacks that were essentially military in nature. A secret bill authorizing the formation of independent secret service corps was passed by the Confederate Congress on 15 February 1864. Courtenay was given a captain's commission in the Confederate Army and permission to form a Secret Service Corps of up to 25 men. The Corps was authorized to attack any Union military vessel or transport carrying military goods found in Confederate waters, but was forbidden to attack civilian shipping or Union shipping in Northern waters. Courtenay would not draw a regular Army salary, but would receive up to 50% of the value of ships and cargo destroyed or captured, payable in Confederate war bonds.

Courtenay planned to purchase a coal barge and seed it with coal torpedoes, as a means of getting his bombs into the ships of the Union blockading fleet, but the plan either failed, or was never carried out. Unfortunately for Courtenay, Confederate correspondence giving details of the plan was captured and Courtenay and his associates became wanted men. Union Admiral of the Mississippi David D. Porter ordered, "I have given orders to commanders of vessels not to be very particular about the treatment of any of these deperadoes if caught—only summary punishment will be effective."

Captain Courtenay obtained permission from President Davis to leave the country and go to the UK to raise money for the Confederacy. Courtenay kept in contact with his corps, and directed their actions from abroad. The coal torpedo was credited with sinking the Greyhound, a private steamboat that had been commandeered by General Butler for use as a floating headquarters on the James River, on 27 November 1864. Courtenay also took credit for the destruction of the gunboat USS Chenango as she sailed from New York Navy Yard on 15 April 1864.

== After the war ==
While in England, Courtenay attempted to sell his coal torpedo to a number of foreign governments, including England, France, Spain, and Turkey, all without success. He returned to the United States in 1868, but he was in poor health for the rest of his life, and died at the age of 53 at Jordan's Sulphur Springs near Winchester, Virginia, on 3 September 1875. He is buried in Mount Olivet Cemetery in Baltimore, Maryland.

== Marriage and children ==
Thomas Edgeworth Courtenay married Mildred Ann Clendenin on 25 August 1847 in Louisville, Kentucky. Mildred's father, James Clendenin, was a merchant in Louisville, who had met Courtenay on a trip to St. Louis. Mildred's mother was from the Peay family of Virginia. Mildred's Uncle Austin Peay had married Peachy Speed, sister of Joshua Fry Speed and James Speed. Since Mildred's father had sold his home and was in the middle of moving to St. Louis, Thomas and Mildred were married at Farmington, the Speed family plantation in Louisville, Kentucky.

Thomas and Mildred had five children:

- Austin Matlack Courtenay (1850–1938)
- James Clendenin Courtenay (1852–1853)
- Charles Edgeworth Courtenay (1854–1854)
- Ellen Watters Courtenay (1856–1938)
- Mary Amelia Isabel Courtenay (1867–1943)

Mildred, Austin and Ellen went to England with Thomas in 1864 and returned in 1867. When Mary was born in 1867, Mildred was living with relatives in Maryland, while Thomas remained in England trying to sell his invention.
