= 1864 =

1864 in various calendars
- Gregorian calendar: 1864; MDCCCLXIV
- Ab urbe condita: 2617
- Armenian calendar: 1313; ԹՎ ՌՅԺԳ
- Assyrian calendar: 6614
- Baháʼí calendar: 20–21
- Balinese saka calendar: 1785–1786
- Bengali calendar: 1270–1271
- Berber calendar: 2814
- British Regnal year: 27 Vict. 1 – 28 Vict. 1
- Buddhist calendar: 2408
- Burmese calendar: 1226
- Byzantine calendar: 7372–7373
- Chinese calendar: 癸亥年 (Water Pig); 4561 or 4354 — to — 甲子年 (Wood Rat); 4562 or 4355
- Coptic calendar: 1580–1581
- Discordian calendar: 3030
- Ethiopian calendar: 1856–1857
- Hebrew calendar: 5624–5625
- Hindu calendars
- Vikram Samvat: 1920–1921
- Shaka Samvat: 1785–1786
- Kali Yuga: 4964–4965
- Holocene calendar: 11864
- Igbo calendar: 864–865
- Iranian calendar: 1242–1243
- Islamic calendar: 1280–1281
- Japanese calendar: Bunkyū 4 / Genji 1 (元治元年)
- Javanese calendar: 1792–1793
- Julian calendar: Gregorian minus 12 days
- Korean calendar: 4197
- Minguo calendar: 48 before ROC 民前48年
- Nanakshahi calendar: 396
- Thai solar calendar: 2406–2407
- Tibetan calendar: ཆུ་མོ་ཕག་ལོ་ (female Water-Boar); 1990 or 1609 or 837 — to — ཤིང་ཕོ་བྱི་བ་ལོ་ (male Wood-Rat); 1991 or 1610 or 838

1864 (MDCCCLXIV) was a leap year starting on Friday of the Gregorian calendar and a leap year starting on Wednesday of the Julian calendar, the 1864th year of the Common Era (CE) and Anno Domini (AD) designations, the 864th year of the 2nd millennium, the 64th year of the 19th century, and the 5th year of the 1860s decade. As of the start of 1864, the Gregorian calendar was 12 days ahead of the Julian calendar, which remained in localized use until 1923.

== Events ==
=== January ===
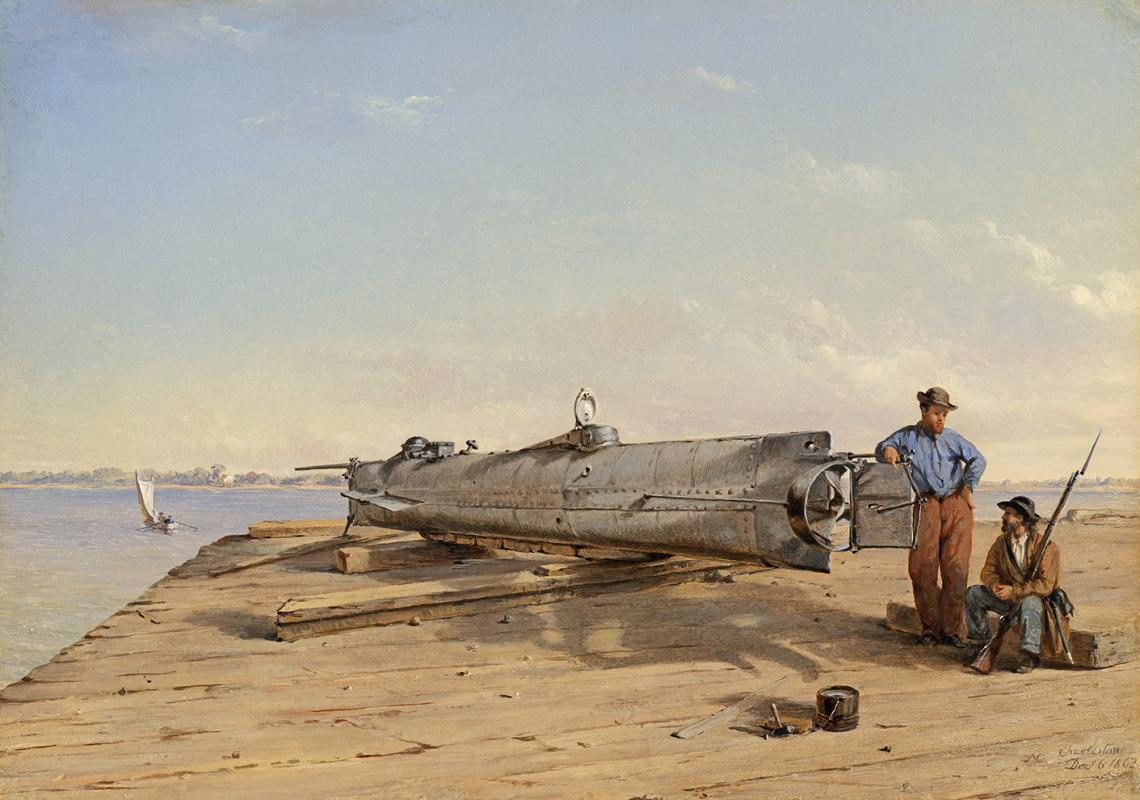
February 17: Submarine H. L. Hunley

- January 13 – American songwriter Stephen Foster ("Oh! Susanna", "Old Folks at Home") dies aged 37 in New York City, leaving a scrap of paper reading "Dear friends and gentle hearts". His parlor song "Beautiful Dreamer" is published in March.
- January 16 – Denmark rejects an Austrian-Prussian ultimatum to repeal the Danish Constitution, which says that Schleswig-Holstein is part of Denmark.
- January 21 – New Zealand Wars: The Tauranga campaign begins.
- January 22 – the Stifone powder-magazine explosion near Narni, Italy, destroys much of the village of Stifone and kills 12 people.

=== February ===
- February – John Wisden publishes The Cricketer's Almanack for the year 1864 in England; it will go on to become the major annual cricket reference publication.
- February 1 – Danish-Prussian War (Second Schleswig War): 57,000 Austrian and Prussian troops cross the Eider River into Denmark.
- February 15 – Heineken Brewery is founded in the Netherlands.
- American Civil War:
  - February 17 – The tiny Confederate hand-propelled submarine H. L. Hunley sinks the USS Housatonic (1861), using a spar torpedo in Charleston Harbor, becoming the first submarine to sink an enemy ship, although the submarine and her crew of eight are also lost.
  - February 20 – The Union suffers one of its costliest defeats at the Battle of Olustee near Lake City, Florida.
  - February 25 – The first Northern prisoners arrive at the Confederate prison at Andersonville, Georgia (the 500 prisoners had left Richmond, Virginia, seven days before).

=== March ===
- March 1 – Alejandro Mon y Menéndez takes office as Prime Minister of Spain.
- American Civil War:
  - March 9 – Abraham Lincoln appoints Ulysses S. Grant commander in chief of all Union armies.
  - March 10 – The Red River Campaign begins, as Union troops reach Alexandria, Louisiana.
- March 11 – Great Sheffield Flood: A reservoir near Sheffield, England, bursts; 250 die.
- March 14 – Rossini's Petite messe solennelle is first performed, by twelve singers, two pianists and a harmonium player in a mansion in Paris.

=== April ===
- April 8 – Gallaudet University is founded in Washington, D.C., as the first university for the deaf and hard of hearing.
- April 12 – American Civil War: Battle of Fort Pillow – Confederate forces kill most of the African American soldiers who surrender at Fort Pillow, Tennessee.
- April 15 – Choe Je-u, founder of the Donghak Movement, is executed by beheading for sedition, at Daegu, Korea.
- April 18 – Danish-Prussian War (Second Schleswig War) – Battle of Dybbøl: The Prussian army, fielding 10,000 men, defeats the Danish defending army of 9,200 at Dybbøl Mill, after an artillery bombardment from April 7–18.
- April 22
  - The United States Congress passes the Coinage Act of 1864, which makes privately issued Civil War tokens illegal. An additional law is passed on June 8 to include all private coinage.
  - The phrase "In God We Trust" appears for the first time on the newly created two-cent piece.
- April 30 – American Civil War: Confederate forces led by General E. Kirby Smith attack federal troops retreating across the Saline at Jenkins' Ferry, Arkansas.

=== May ===
- May 2 – Under terms of the Treaty of London, the United Kingdom voluntarily cedes control of the United States of the Ionian Islands to the Kingdom of Greece.
- May 4 – Société Générale, a major financial group in France, is founded.
- May 5 – American Civil War: The Battle of the Wilderness begins in Spotsylvania County, Virginia.

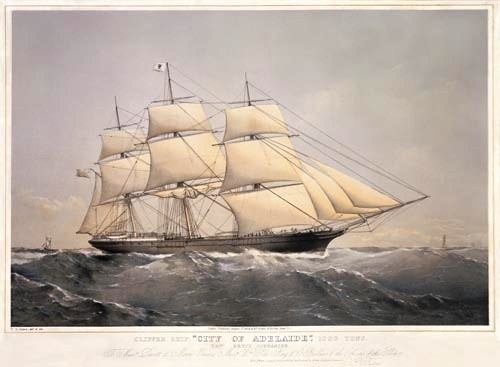
Clipper ship City of Adelaide in 1864

- May 7
  - American Civil War: The Army of the Potomac, under General Ulysses S. Grant, breaks off from the Battle of the Wilderness and moves southwards.
  - The clipper ship City of Adelaide is launched in Sunderland, England. By the 21st century, she will be the world's oldest surviving clipper of only two (Cutty Sark being the other).
- May 8–21 – American Civil War: Battle of Spotsylvania Court House (The Bloody Angle) – Some 4,000 troops on both sides die in an inconclusive engagement.
- May 9
  - Danish-Prussian War (Second Schleswig War): Battle of Heligoland – The Danish navy gains a tactical victory over those of Austria and Prussia, near the island of Heligoland. It is the last significant naval battle fought by squadrons of wooden ships, and also the last involving Denmark.
  - American general John Sedgwick is shot dead during the Battle of Spotsylvania Court House, shortly after uttering the famous last words: "They couldn't hit an elephant from this distance!"

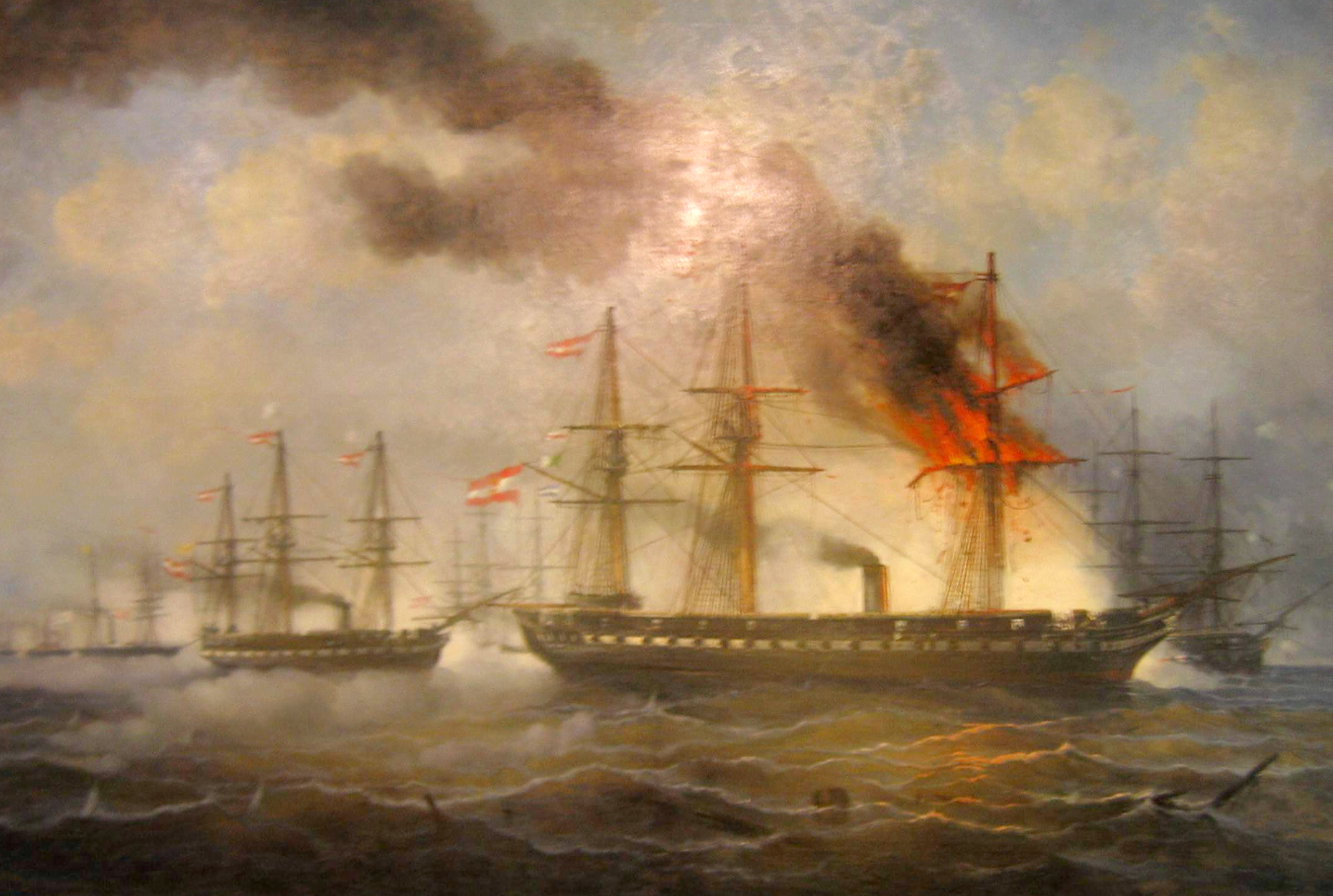
Battle of Heligoland in 1864 by Josef Carl Barthold Puettner

- American Civil War:
  - May 11 – Battle of Yellow Tavern – Confederate General J. E. B. Stuart is mortally wounded at Yellow Tavern, Virginia.
  - May 13 – Battle of Resaca – The battle begins with Union General Sherman fighting toward Atlanta.
- & May 15 – Battle of New Market – Cadets from the Virginia Military Institute fight alongside the Confederate Army, forcing Union General Franz Sigel out of the Shenandoah Valley.
- May 18 – Civil War gold hoax: The New York World and the New York Journal of Commerce publish a fake proclamation that President Abraham Lincoln has issued a draft of 400,000 more soldiers.
- May 20
  - American Civil War: Battle of Ware Bottom Church – In the Virginia Bermuda Hundred Campaign, 10,000 troops fight in this Confederate victory.
  - Australian bushranger Ben Hall and his gang escape from a shootout with police, after attempting to rob the Bang Bang Hotel in Koorawatha, New South Wales.
- May 21 – The Russian Empire begins the Circassian genocide. More than 1.5 million Circassians are driven from their homeland to the Ottoman Empire, ending the Russo-Circassian War.
- May 26 – Montana Territory is organized out of parts of Washington Territory and Dakota Territory.

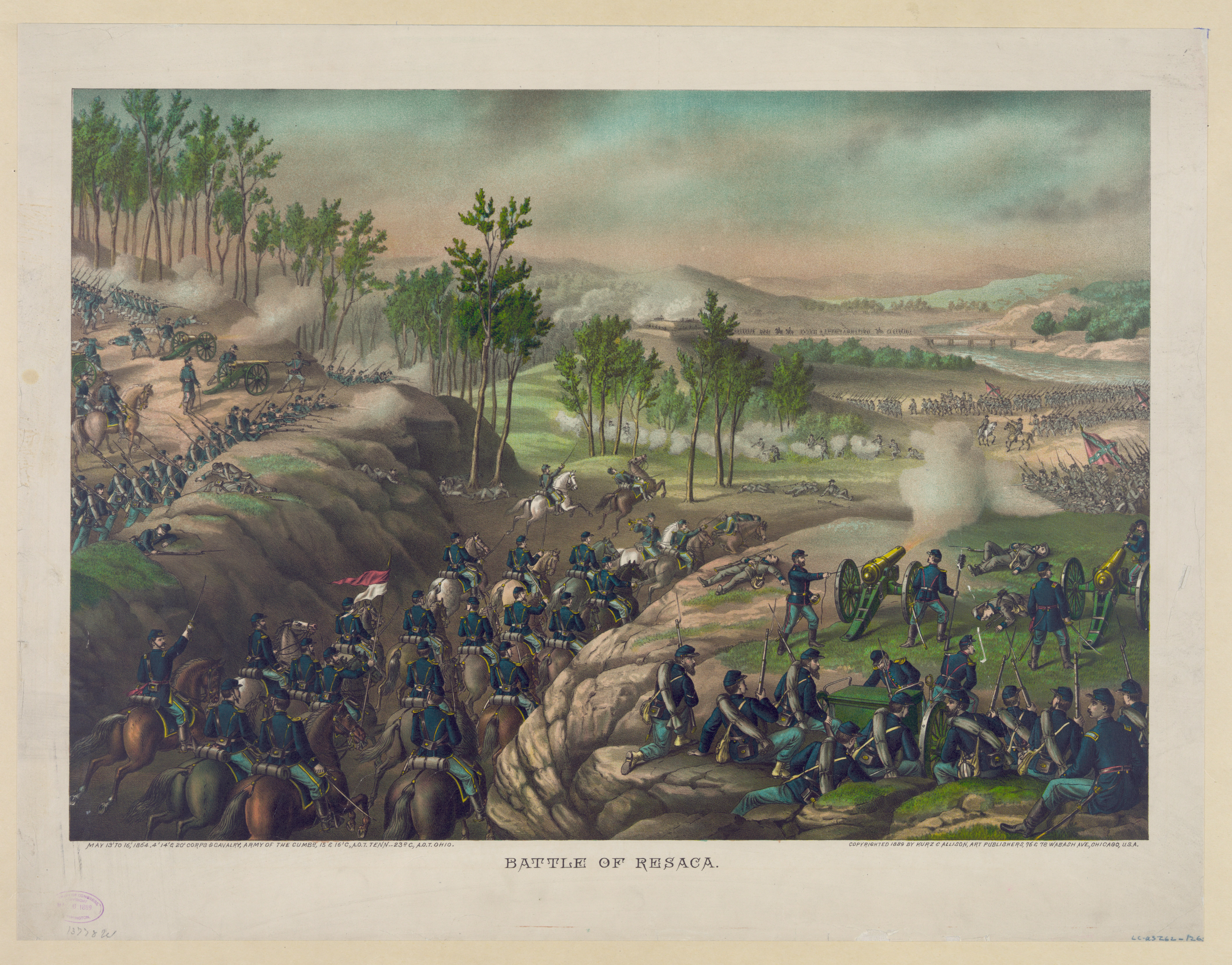
May 13: Battle of Resaca

=== June ===
- June 5
  - In Marseille, Notre-Dame de la Garde, the city's most famous landmark, is consecrated.
  - American Civil War: Battle of Piedmont – Union forces under General David Hunter defeat a Confederate army at Piedmont, West Virginia, taking nearly 1,000 prisoners.
- American Civil War:
  - June 9 – First Battle of Petersburg
  - June 10
    - Battle of Noonday Creek – Confederate troops defeat Union forces, near Kennesaw, Georgia.
    - Battle of Brice's Crossroads – Confederate troops under Nathan Bedford Forrest defeat a much larger Union force, led by General Samuel D. Sturgis, in Mississippi.
  - June 12 – Battle of Cold Harbor – General Ulysses S. Grant pulls his troops from their positions at Cold Harbor, Virginia, and moves south.
- June 15 – Arlington National Cemetery is established in the United States, when 200 acres (0.81 km^{2}) of the grounds of Robert E. Lee's home (Arlington House) are officially set aside as a military cemetery, by U.S. Secretary of War Edwin M. Stanton.
- June 18
  - The Decree of Extended Freedom of Trade introduces complete freedom of trade in Sweden.
  - The January Uprising ends in the defeat of Polish forces.
- June 19 – American Civil War: Battle of Cherbourg – Confederate States Navy CSS Alabama is sunk in a single-ship action with USS Kearsarge, in the English Channel off the coast of the Cotentin Peninsula, France.
- June 21 – New Zealand Wars: The Tauranga Campaign ends.
- June 27 – American Civil War: Battle of Kennesaw Mountain – Confederate troops defeat Union forces near Kennesaw, Georgia.
- June 29
  - Second Schleswig War: The Battle of Als is won by the Prussians under General Herwarth von Bittenfeld, who occupy the island of Als after crossing the Alssund, between the village of Sottrupskov and the Sandbjerg Estate, by night. Of 9,000 Danish troops stationed there, a third are killed, wounded or captured.
  - St-Hilaire train disaster, a passenger train operated by Grand Trunk Railway and travelling from Quebec City to Montreal is derailed at a swung open bridge after a signal passed at danger. The train also collapses onto a ship, sinking both ship and train. 99 people are killed and 100 injured making this the deadliest train accident in Canada's history.
- June – The United States Sanitary Commission's Sanitary Fair in Philadelphia takes place.

=== July ===
- July 2 – Dimitri Atanasescu founds the first Romanian school in the Balkans for Aromanians in Trnovo, in the Ottoman Empire (modern-day North Macedonia). By the early 20th century, the number of these schools will have risen to 106.
- July 4 – The University of Bucharest in Romania is founded.

American Civil War in 1864

- July 18 – President Lincoln issues a true proclamation of conscription of 500,000 men, for the U.S. Civil War.
- July 19 – The Third Battle of Nanking climaxes, when the Taiping Heavenly Kingdom capital of Nanking falls to an assault by Imperial Qing dynasty forces, in the last major action of the Taiping Rebellion in China. There are probably more than a million troops in the battle, and the Taiping army sustains at least 100,000 dead.
- American Civil War:
  - July 20 – Battle of Peachtree Creek – Near Atlanta, Confederate forces led by General John Bell Hood unsuccessfully attack Union troops under General William T. Sherman.
  - July 22 – Battle of Atlanta – Outside of Atlanta, Confederate General Hood leads an unsuccessful attack on Union troops under General Sherman, on Bald Hill.
  - July 24 – Second Battle of Kernstown – Confederate General Jubal Early defeats Union troops led by General George Crook in an effort to keep the Yankees out of the Shenandoah Valley.
  - July 28 – Battle of Ezra Church – Confederate troops, led by General Hood, make a third unsuccessful attempt to drive Union forces under General Sherman from Atlanta.
  - July 29 – Confederate spy Belle Boyd is arrested by Union troops, and detained at the Old Capitol Prison in Washington, D.C.
  - July 30 – Battle of the Crater – Union forces attempt to break Confederate lines, by exploding a large bomb under their trenches.

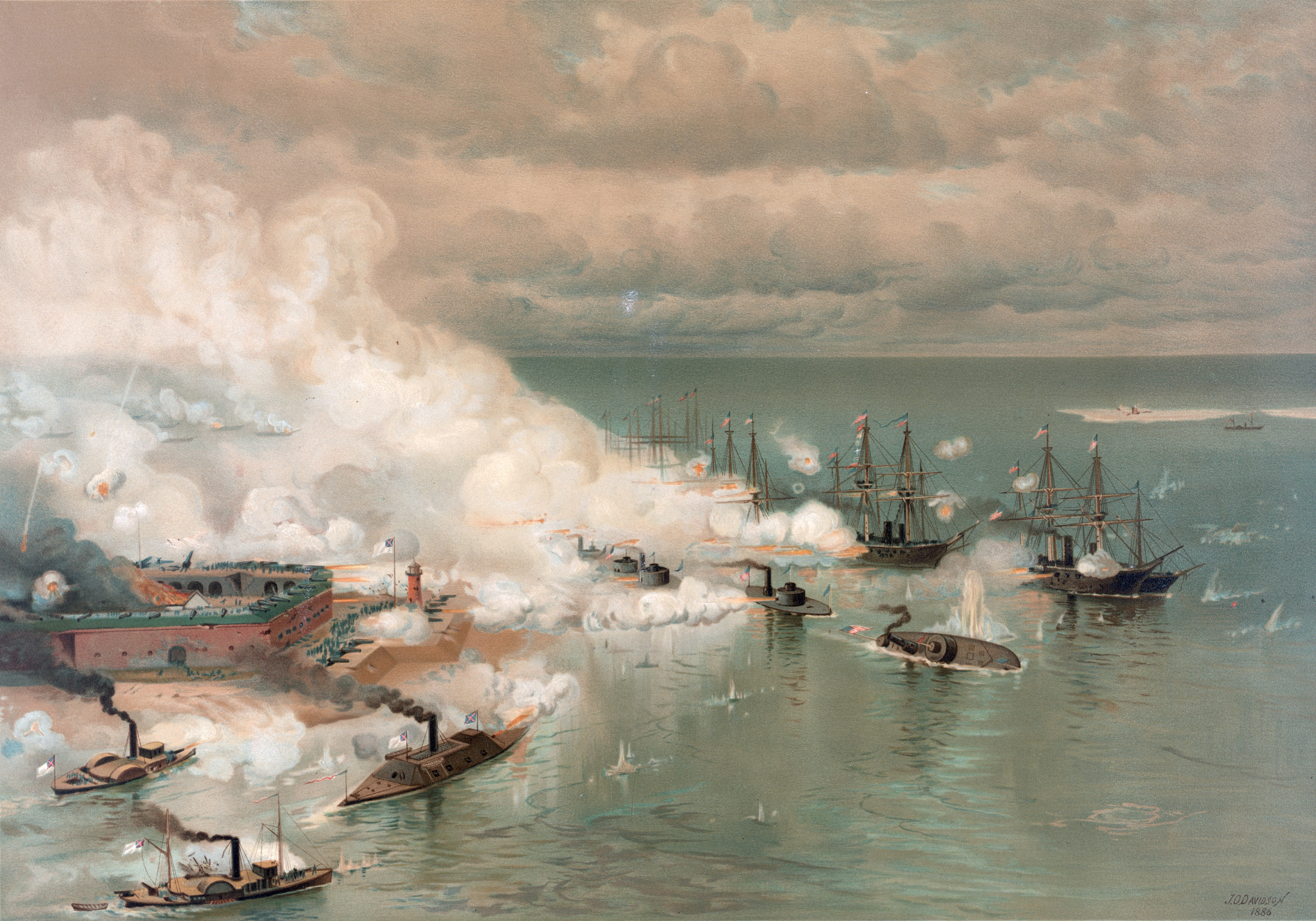
August 5: Battle of Mobile Bay

=== August ===
- August 1 – The Elgin Watch Company is founded in Elgin, Illinois.
- August 5 – American Civil War: Battle of Mobile Bay – At Mobile Bay near Mobile, Alabama, Admiral David Farragut leads a Union flotilla through Confederate defenses, and seals one of the last major Southern ports.
- August 10 – An undeclared Uruguayan War begins, when Uruguay refuses an ultimatum from the Empire of Brazil.
- August 13 – The first fish and chips shop perhaps opens in London.
- August 18 – American Civil War: Battle of Globe Tavern – Forces under Union General Ulysses S. Grant try to cut a vital Confederate supply-line into Petersburg, Virginia, by attacking the Wilmington and Weldon Railroad, forcing the Confederates to use wagons.
- August 22 – The First Geneva Convention, for the Amelioration of the Condition of the Wounded in Armies in the Field, is signed in Geneva by 12 European states, under the auspices of the International Committee for Relief to the Wounded (predecessor of the International Red Cross and Red Crescent Movement).

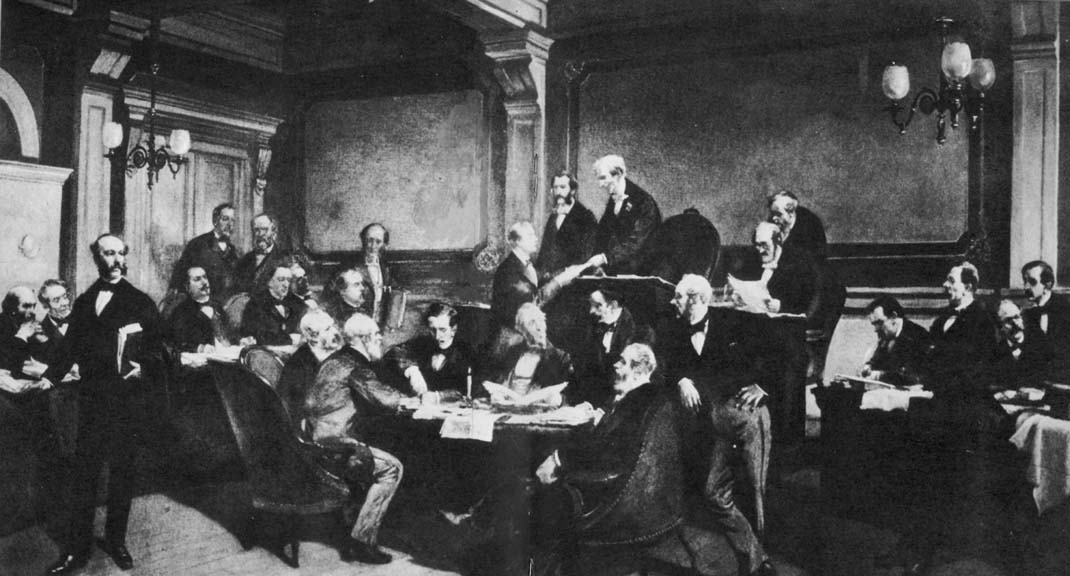
August 22: Signing of the First Geneva Convention

- August 31 – American Civil War: Union forces, led by General William T. Sherman, launch an assault on Atlanta.

=== September ===
- September 1
  - American Civil War: Confederate General Hood evacuates Atlanta, after a 4-month siege mounted by Union General Sherman.
  - Charlottetown Conference: Delegates from the Canadian colonies meet, to discuss Canadian Confederation.
- September 2 – American Civil War: Union forces under General Sherman enter Atlanta, a day after the Confederate defenders fled the city.
- September 5–6 – Bombardment of Shimonoseki: An American, British, Dutch and French alliance engages the powerful feudal Japanese warlord or daimyō Lord Mōri Takachika, of the Chōshū clan, based in Shimonoseki, Japan.
- September 7 – American Civil War: Atlanta is evacuated on orders of Union General William Tecumseh Sherman.
- September 16 – Pope Pius IX establishes the Diocese of Gozo.
- September 17 – American Civil War: The Second Battle of Cabin Creek is fought in Indian Territory.
- September 28 – The International Workingmen's Association is founded in London.

=== October ===
- October 1 – A calamity is narrowly averted in London at the Erith explosion
- October 2 – American Civil War: First Battle of Saltville – Union forces attack Saltville, Virginia, but are defeated by Confederate troops.
- October 5 – A cyclone kills 70,000 people in and around Calcutta in India.
- October 9 – American Civil War: Battle of Tom's Brook – Union cavalrymen in the Shenandoah Valley defeat Confederate forces at Tom's Brook, Virginia.
- October 10 – The Quebec Conference begins, to discuss plans for the creation of a Dominion of Canada.
- October 12 – Uruguayan War: Forces of the Empire of Brazil invade Uruguay, in support of Venancio Flores' Colorado Party.
- October 28 – American Civil War: Second Battle of Fair Oaks – Union forces under General Ulysses S. Grant withdraw from Fair Oaks, Virginia, after failing to breach the Confederate defenses around Richmond, Virginia.
- October 30
  - The Second Schleswig War is concluded. Denmark renounces all claim to Schleswig, Holstein, and Lauenburg, which come under Prussian and Austrian administration.
  - Helena, Montana, is founded, after four prospectors (the so-called Four Georgians) discover gold at Last Chance Gulch; it is their last and agreed final attempt for weeks, of trying to find gold in the northern Rockies.
  - An annular solar eclipse occurs, the 42nd solar eclipse of Solar Saros 131.
- October 31 – Nevada is admitted as the 36th U.S. state.

=== November ===
- November 4 – American Civil War: Battle of Johnsonville – At Johnsonville, Tennessee, troops under the command of Confederate General Nathan Bedford Forrest bombard a Union supply base with artillery, and destroy millions of dollars' worth of material.
- November 7 – The capital of Idaho Territory is moved from Lewiston to Boise; North Idaho declares the move illegal, and proposes secession.
- November 8 – 1864 United States presidential election: Abraham Lincoln is reelected, in an overwhelming victory over George B. McClellan.
- November 12 – Hostilities in the Paraguayan War open, with the Paraguayan ship Tacuarí capturing the Brazilian Marquês de Olinda, in the Paraguay River.
- American Civil War:
  - November 15 – Sherman's March to the Sea begins: Union General Sherman burns Atlanta and starts to move south, living off the land, and causing extensive devastation to crops and mills.
  - November 20 – The judicial reform of Alexander II is launched in the Russian Empire.
  - November 22 – Sherman's March to the Sea – Confederate General John Bell Hood invades Tennessee, in an unsuccessful attempt to draw Union General Sherman from Georgia.
  - November 25 – A group of Confederate operatives, calling themselves the Confederate Army of Manhattan, starts fires in more than 20 locations, in an unsuccessful attempt to burn down New York City.
- November 29 – American Indian Wars: Sand Creek massacre – Colorado volunteers, led by Colonel John Chivington, massacre at least 400 Cheyenne and Arapaho noncombatants at Sand Creek, Colorado (where they had been given permission to camp); many of the dead are subsequently mutilated.

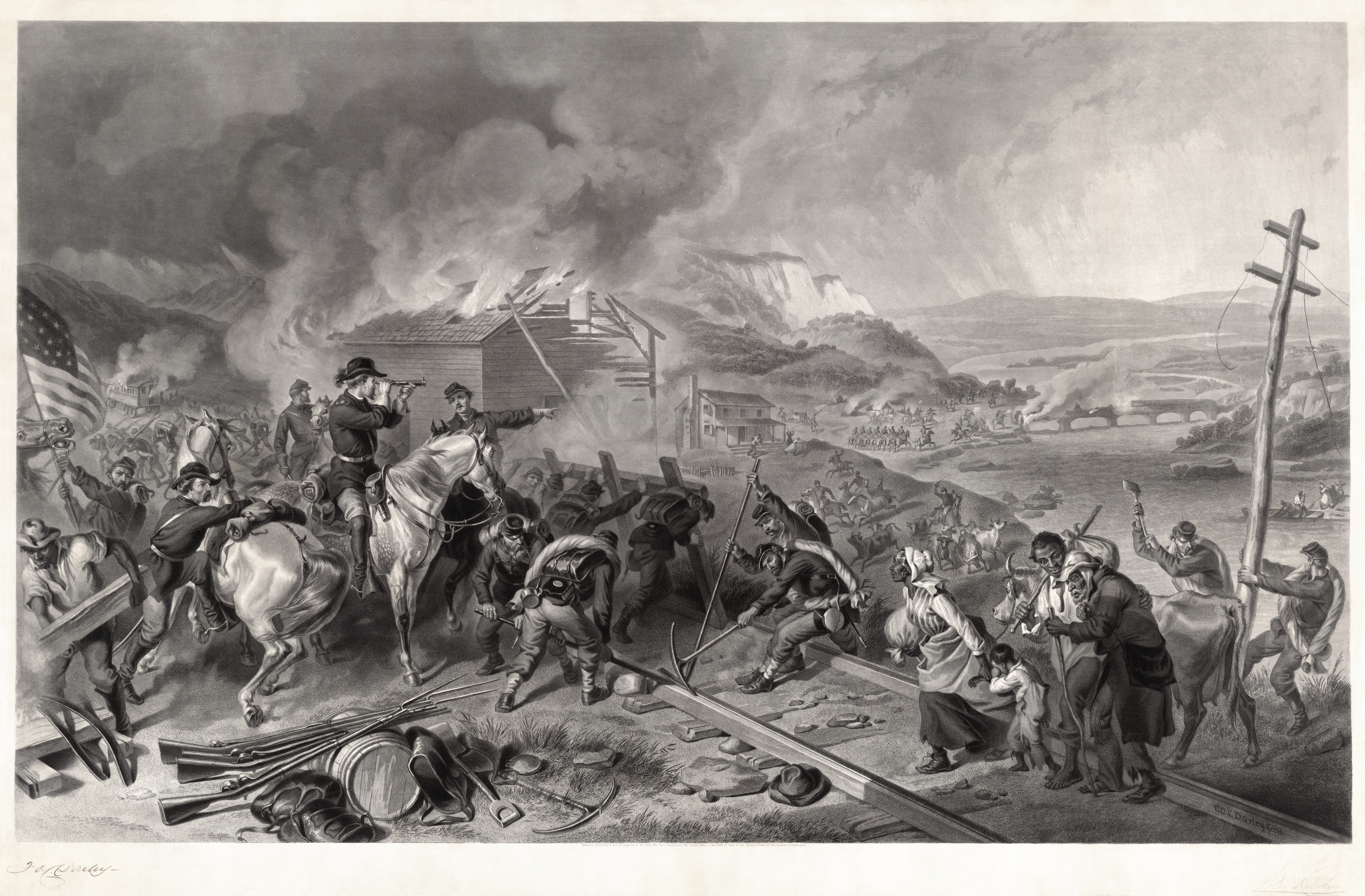
Nov.15: Sherman's March to the Sea

- November 30 – American Civil War: Second Battle of Franklin – The Confederate Army of Tennessee, led by General Hood, mounts a dramatically unsuccessful frontal assault on Union positions around Franklin, Tennessee (Hood loses 6 generals and almost a third of his troops).

=== December ===
- December 1 – The Great Fire of Brisbane breaks out in Australia.
- December 4 – American Civil War: Sherman's March to the Sea – At Waynesboro, Georgia, forces under Union General Judson Kilpatrick prevent troops, led by Confederate General Joseph Wheeler, from interfering with Union General Sherman's campaign of destroying a wide swath of the South, on his march to Savannah; Union forces suffer more than 3 times the casualties as the Confederates, however.
- December 8
  - James Clerk Maxwell presents his paper, A Dynamical Theory of the Electromagnetic Field, to the Royal Society in London, treating light as an electromagnetic wave.
  - Syllabus errorum: Pope Pius IX condemns theological liberalism as an error, and claims the supremacy of Roman Catholic Church authority over civil society. He also condemns rationalism and socialism.
  - The Clifton Suspension Bridge across the River Avon (Bristol) in England, designed by Isambard Kingdom Brunel and completed as a memorial to him, opens to traffic.
- December 13 – Paraguayan War: Paraguay formally declares war on the Empire of Brazil, in support of the Uruguayan National Party. The war continues to 1870, with around 300,000 Paraguayan deaths.
- December 15–16 – American Civil War: Battle of Nashville – Union forces decisively defeat the Confederate Army of Tennessee.

=== Date unknown ===
- The Second Anglo-Ashanti War ends.
- The Dutch conquer southern Sumatra.
- Asa Mercer travels from Seattle to the U.S. East Coast, and recruits 11 Mercer Girls, potential wives for men on the West Coast.
- The first Quanjude Peking Roast Duck restaurant opens on Qianmen Street in Peking, China.
- Yasudaya Currency Exchange Bank, as predecessor of Mizuho Financial Group, is founded in Edo (modern-day Tokyo), Japan.
- Merchants Bank of Halifax, as predecessor of Royal Bank of Canada, founded in Nova Scotia.

== Births ==
=== January–March ===
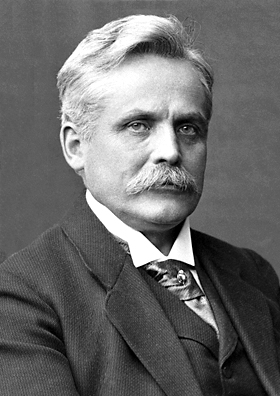
Wilhelm Wien

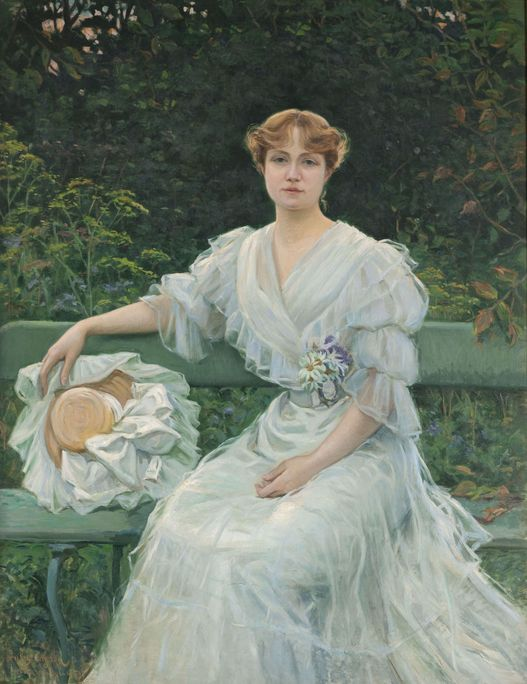
Marguerite Durand

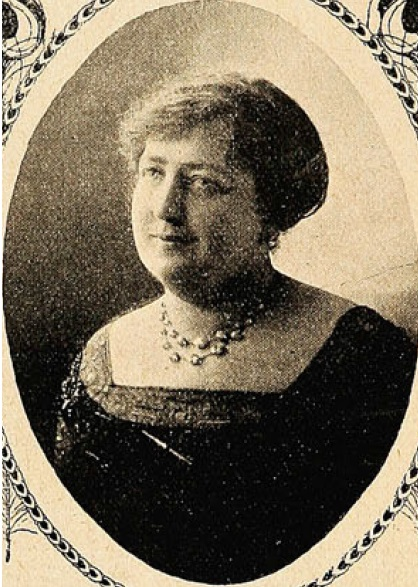
Ana Echazarreta

- January 1
  - Qi Baishi, Chinese painter (d. 1957)
  - Alfred Stieglitz, American photographer (d. 1946)
- January 8 – Prince Albert Victor, Duke of Clarence and Avondale (d. 1892)
- January 13 – Wilhelm Wien, German physicist, Nobel Prize laureate (d. 1928)
- January 21 – Israel Zangwill, British novelist, playwright (d. 1926)
- January 24 – Marguerite Durand, French actress, journalist and feminist leader (d. 1936)
- January 28 – Herbert Akroyd Stuart, English mechanical engineer, inventor (d. 1927)
- February 4 – James Fenton, Australian politician (d. 1950)
- February 7 – Arthur Collins, early American recording artist (d. 1933)
- February 11 – Louis Bouveault, French chemist (d. 1909)
- February 14 – Hadley Williams, Canadian surgeon and educator (d. 1932)
- February 17 – Banjo Paterson, Australian poet (d. 1941)
- February 20 – Henry Rawlinson, 1st Baron Rawlinson, British general (d. 1925)
- March 4 – David W. Taylor, American naval architect (d. 1940)
- March 12 – W. H. R. Rivers, English psychiatrist (d. 1922)
- March 13 – Alexej von Jawlensky, Russian expressionist painter (d. 1941)
- March 14 – Casey Jones, American railway engineer (d. 1900)
- March 14 – Alfred Redl, Austrian military intelligence officer and double agent (suicide 1913)
- March 15 – Johan Halvorsen, Norwegian composer (d. 1935)
- March 17 – Joseph Baptista, Indian Home Rule Movement founder (d. 1930)
- March 19 – Charles Marion Russell, American artist (d. 1926)
- March 23
  - Robert Arbuthnot, British admiral (d. 1916)
  - Sándor Simonyi-Semadam, 26th Prime Minister of Hungary (d. 1946)

=== April–June ===
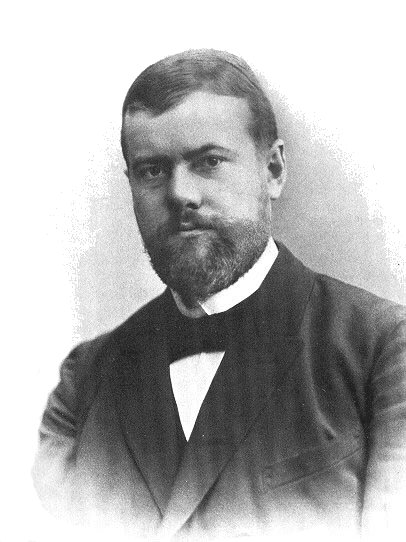
Max Weber

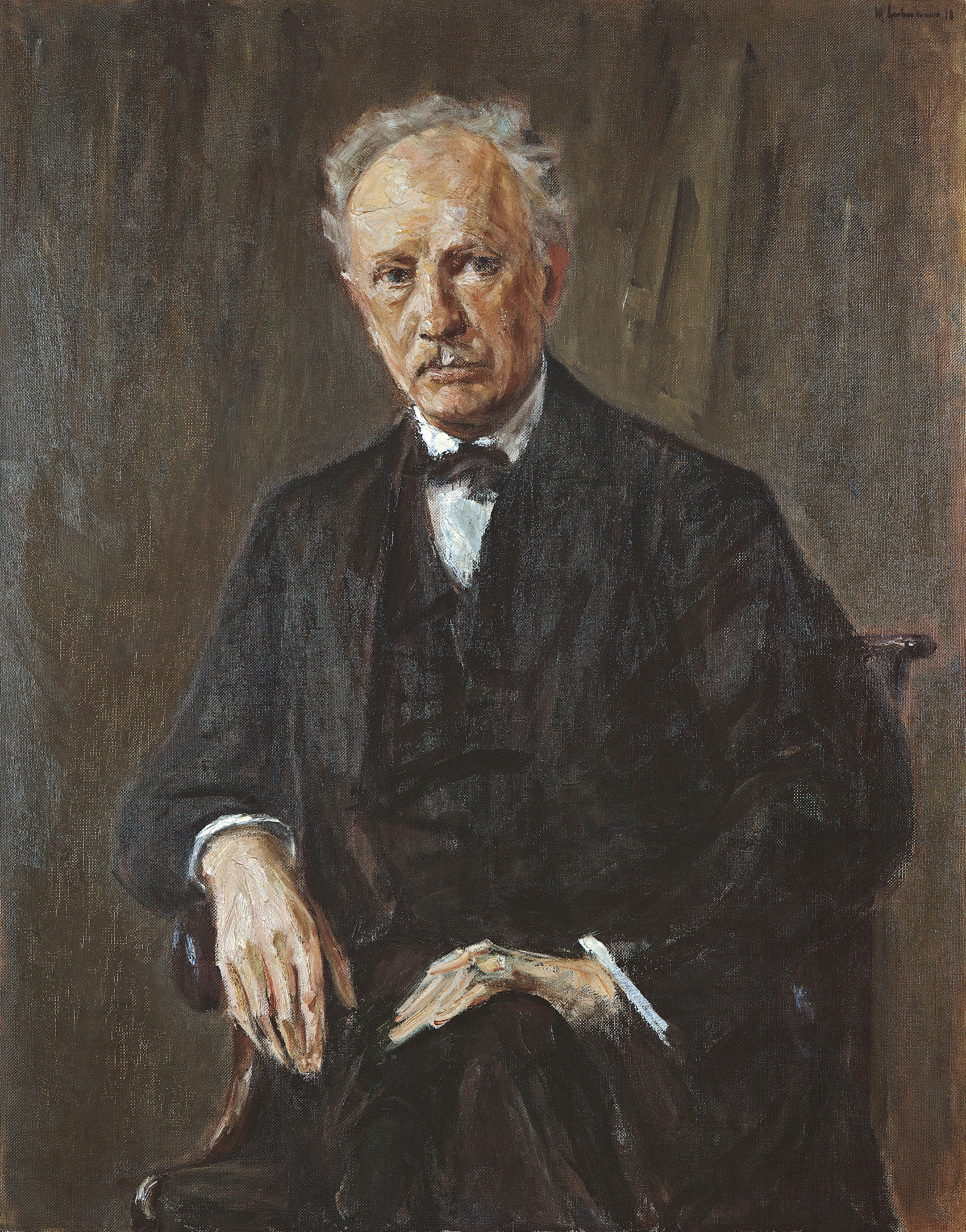
Richard Strauss, 1918

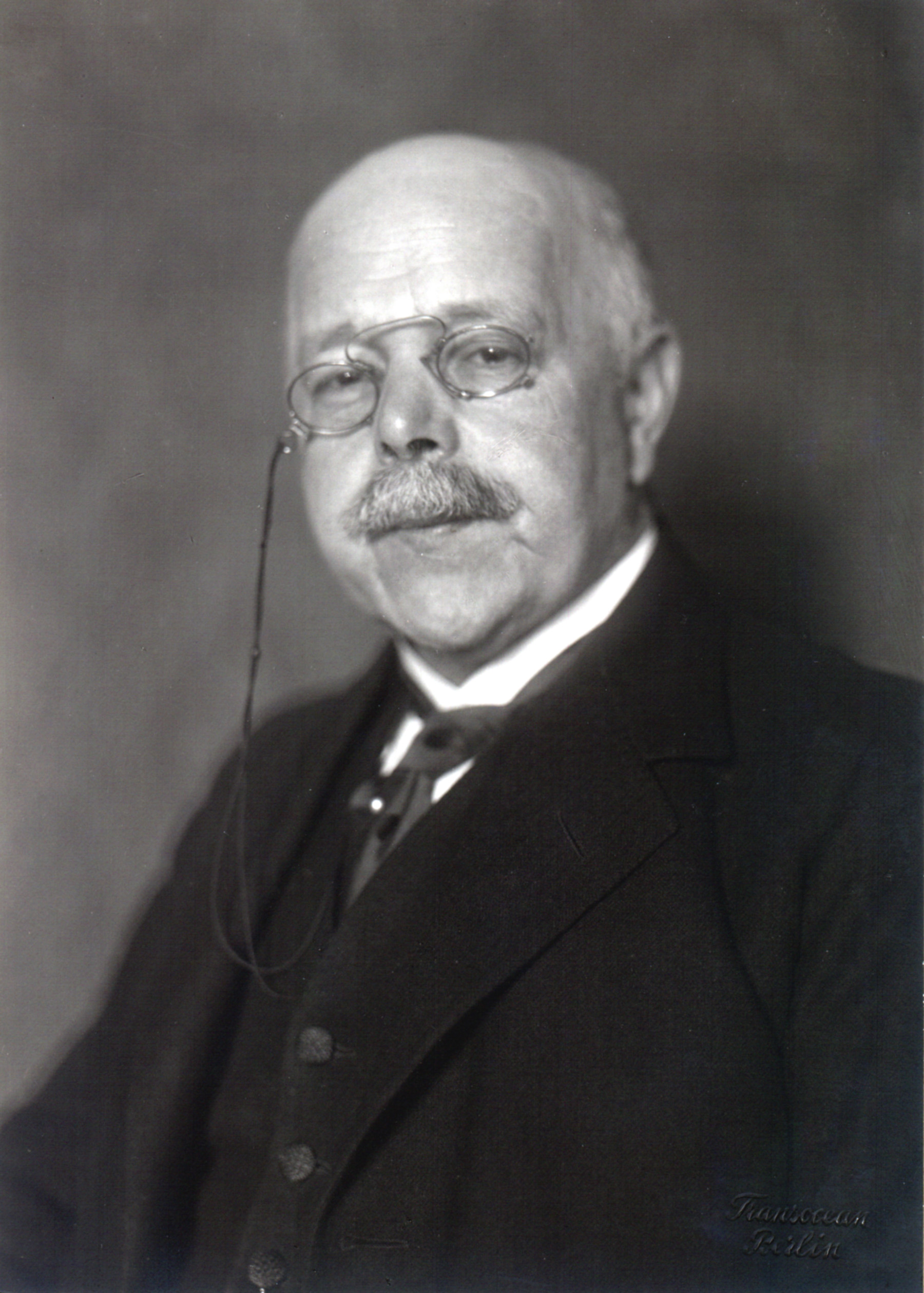
Walther Nernst

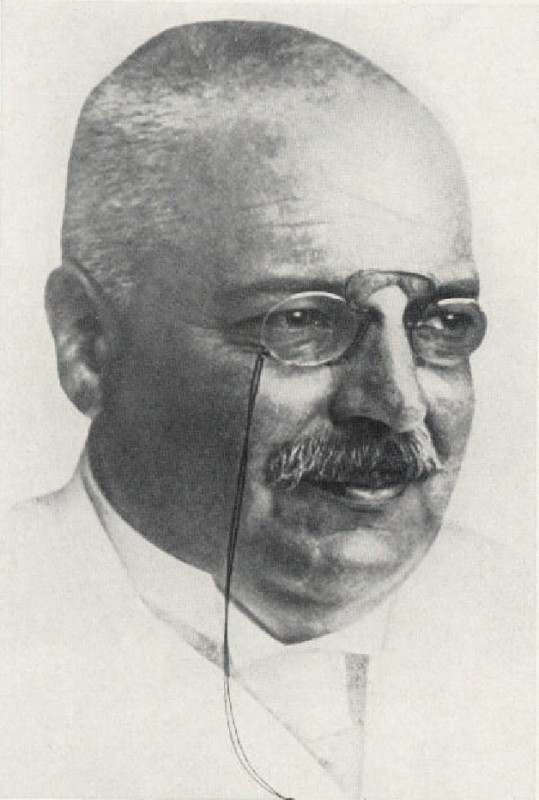
Alois Alzheimer

- April 10
  - Clara Lachmann, Danish-Swedish patron of the arts (d. 1920)
  - Michael Mayr, 2nd Chancellor of Austria (d. 1922)
  - Tully Marshall, American actor (d. 1943)
- April 11 – Johanna Elberskirchen, German feminist (d. 1943)
- April 12 – Rosslyn Wemyss, 1st Baron Wester Wemyss, British admiral (d. 1933)
- April 14 – Artur Văitoianu, Romanian general and politician, 27th Prime Minister of Romania (d. 1956)
- April 21 – Max Weber, German sociologist (d. 1920)
- May 5 – Sir Henry Wilson, 1st Baronet, British field marshal, politician (d. 1922)
- May 10 – Léon Gaumont, French film pioneer (d. 1946)
- May 15 – Vilhelm Hammershøi, Danish painter (d. 1916)
- May 20 – Vasily Gurko, Russian general (d. 1937)
- May 25 – Princess Anne of Löwenstein-Wertheim-Freudenberg, British-born German aristocrat, aviation enthusiast (d. 1927, officially declared dead February 1928)
- June 2 – Wilhelm Souchon, German admiral (d. 1946)
- June 3 – Ransom E. Olds, American automotive pioneer (d. 1950)
- June 10 – Ninian Comper, British architect (d. 1960)
- June 11 – Richard Strauss, German composer (d. 1949)
- June 13 – Dwight B. Waldo, American educator, historian (d. 1939)
- June 14 – Alois Alzheimer, German psychiatrist, neuropathologist (d. 1915)
- June 22 – Hermann Minkowski, German mathematician (d. 1909)
- June 25 – Walther Nernst, German chemist, Nobel Prize laureate (d. 1941)
- June 30 – Frederick Bligh Bond, English architect (d. 1945)

=== July–September ===
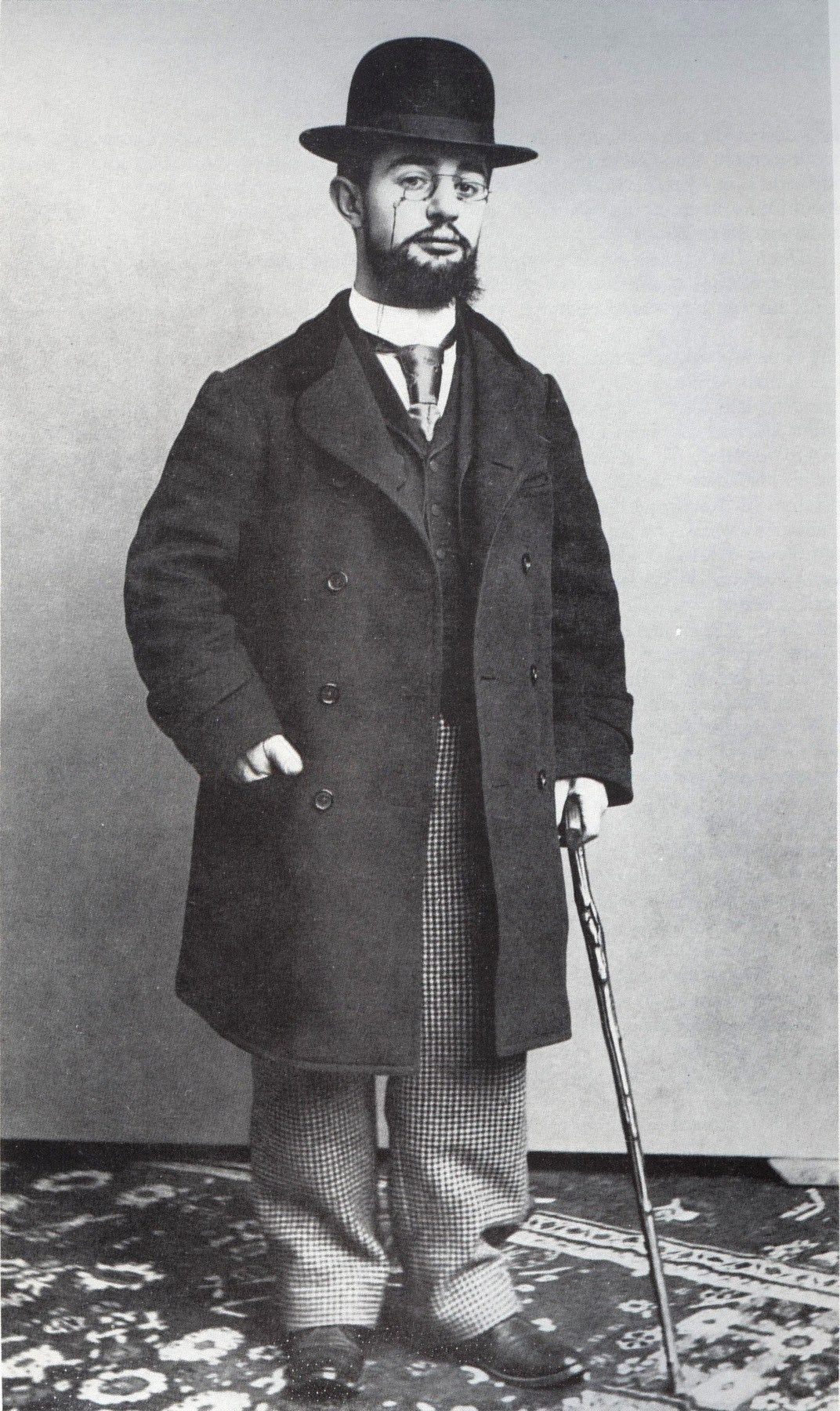
Henri de Toulouse-Lautrec

- July 12
  - George Washington Carver, African-American botanist (d. 1943)
  - Peter Deunov, Bulgarian spiritual teacher (d. 1944)
- July 13 – John Jacob Astor IV, American businessman, inventor (d. 1912)
- July 15 – Marie Tempest, English stage, film actress (d. 1942)
- July 20 – Erik Axel Karlfeldt, Swedish writer, Nobel Prize laureate (d. 1931)
- July 21 – Frances Cleveland, First Lady of the United States (d. 1947)
- July 23 – Apolinario Mabini, Filipino political theoretician, Prime Minister (d. 1903)
- August 9 – Roman Dmowski, Polish politician (d. 1939)
- August 20 – Ion I. C. Brătianu, 5-time prime minister of Romania (d. 1927)
- August 23 – Eleftherios Venizelos, 7-time prime minister of Greece (d. 1936)
- September 14 – Robert Cecil, 1st Viscount Cecil of Chelwood, English politician, diplomat, recipient of the Nobel Peace Prize (d. 1958)

=== October–December ===
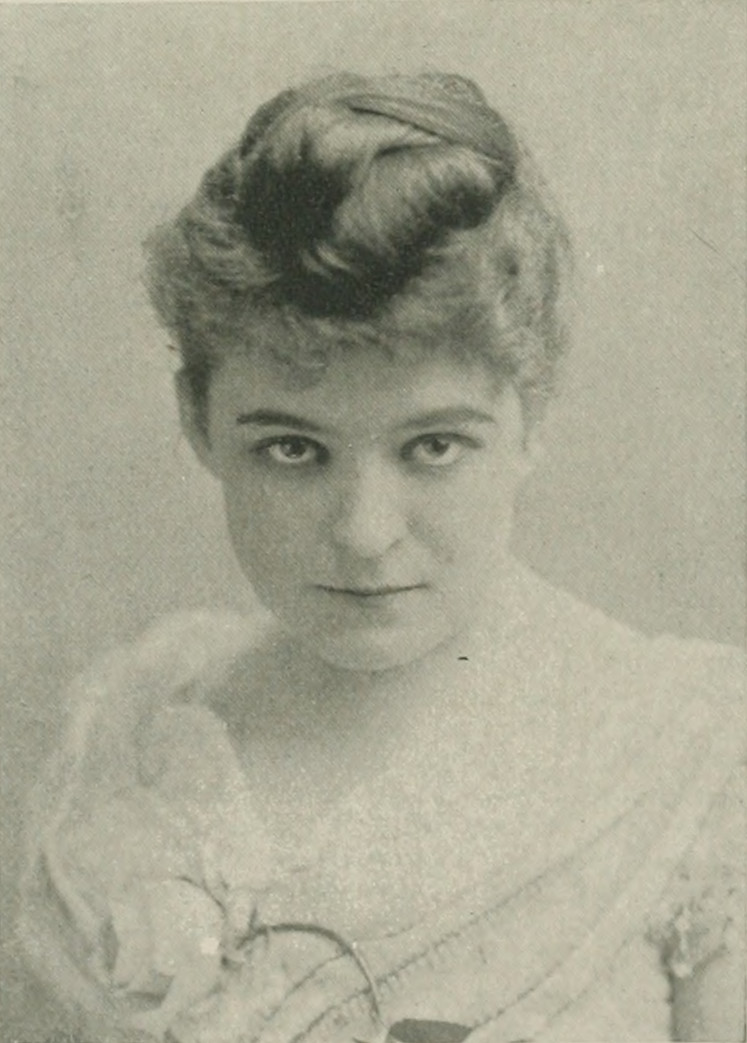
Emma Sheridan Fry

- October 1 – Emma Sheridan Fry, American actress and playwright (d. 1936)
- October 3 – Sentō Takenaka, Japanese admiral (d. 1919)
- October 5 – Louis Lumière, French inventor (d. 1948)
- October 8
  - Kikunae Ikeda, Japanese chemist (d. 1936)
  - Aleksander Meysztowicz, Polish politician and landowner (died 1943)
- October 9 – Reginald Dyer, British army officer, perpetrator of Jallianwala Bagh massacre (d. 1927)
- October 15 – Lorenzo Lauri, Italian cardinal (d. 1941)
- October 25 – Alexander Gretchaninov, Russian composer (d. 1956)
- October 31 – Cosmo Gordon Lang, Archbishop of Canterbury (d. 1945)
- November 5 – Jessie Ralph, American actress (d. 1944)
- November 1 – Princess Elisabeth of Hesse and by Rhine (d. 1918)
- November 11 – Alfred Hermann Fried, Austrian writer, pacifist, recipient of the Nobel Peace Prize (d. 1921)
- November 24 – Henri de Toulouse-Lautrec, French painter (d. 1901)
- November 26 – Edward Higgins, third General of The Salvation Army (d. 1947)
- November 27 – Alfred Meyer-Waldeck, German admiral (d. 1928)
- December 6
  - Alberico Albricci, Italian general (d. 1936)
  - William S. Hart, American film actor, director and writer (d. 1946)
- December 8 – Camille Claudel, French sculptor (d. 1943)
- December 9 – Breaker Morant, Australian soldier (d. 1902)
- December 12 – Paul Elmer More, American critic, essayist (d. 1937)
- December 14 – Frank Campeau, American actor (d. 1943)
- December 23 – Princess Zorka of Montenegro (d. 1890)
- December 25 – Thomas Cahill, American soccer coach (d. 1951)
- December 27 – Peyton C. March, U.S. Army general (d. 1955)

=== Date unknown ===
- Ali Rikabi, 2-time prime minister of Jordan (d. 1943)

== Deaths ==
=== January–June ===
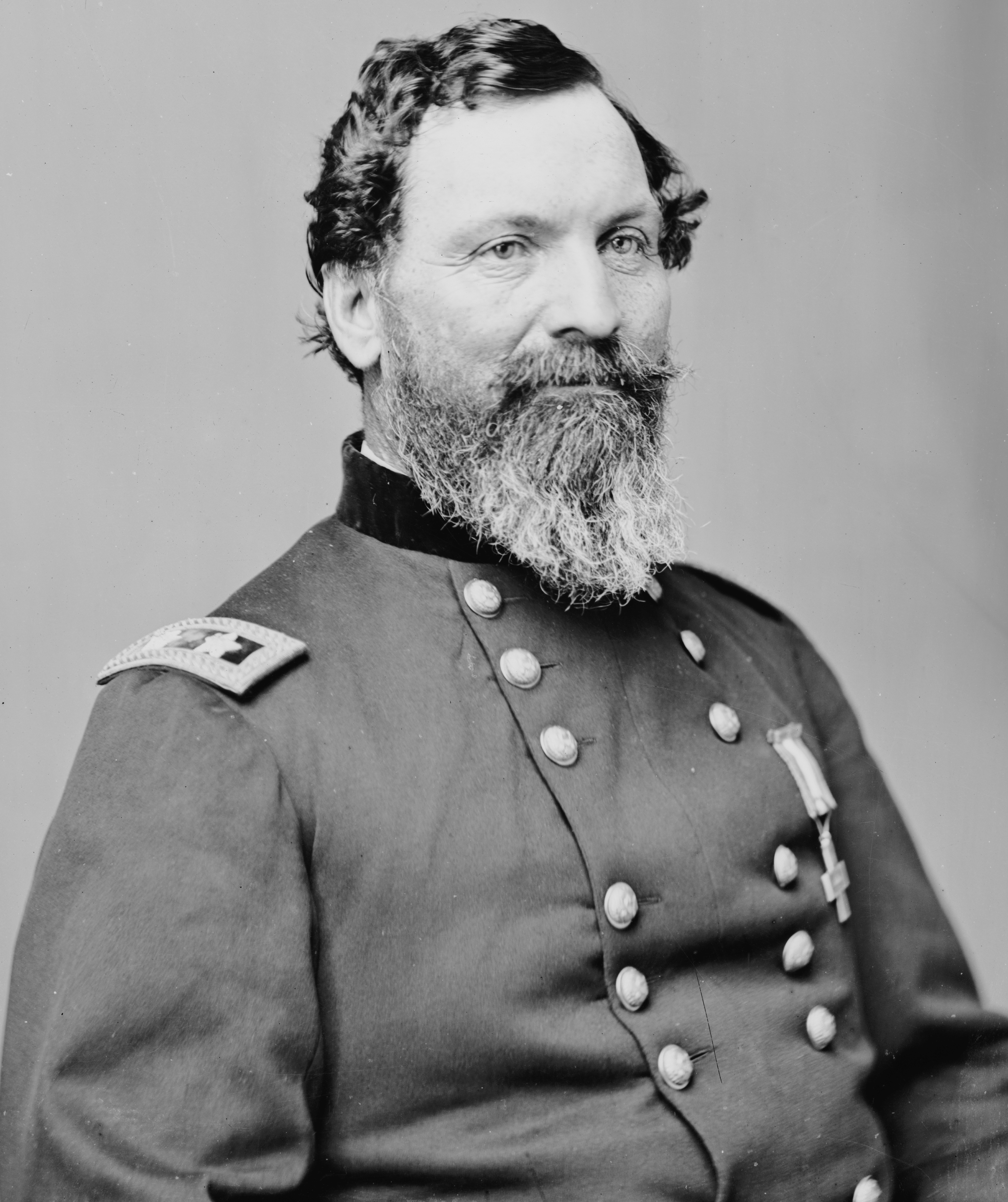
John Sedgwick

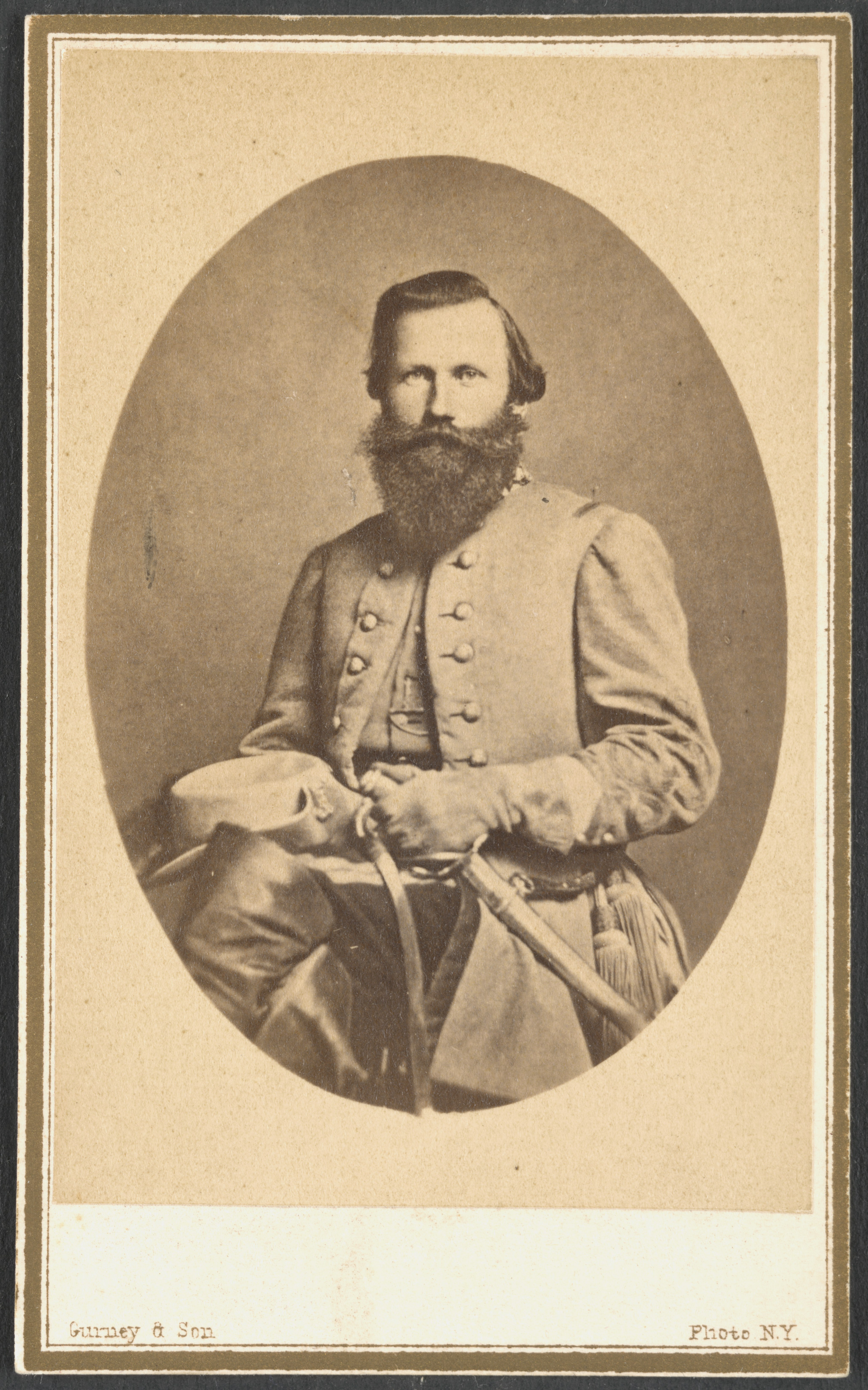
J. E. B. Stuart

- January 13 – Stephen Foster, American song composer (b. 1826)
- January 24 – Vedanayagam Sastriar, Tamil Lutheran hymnwriter and court poet in the palace of Serfoji II, the last Maratha King of Thanjavur (b. 1774)
- January 27 – Leo von Klenze, German neoclassicist architect, painter and writer (b. 1784)
- February 7 – Vuk Stefanović Karadžić, Serbian linguist, major reformer of the Serbian language (b. 1787)
- February 22 – James Sewall Reed, U.S. Army officer (in battle) (b. 1832)
- February 25 – Anna Harrison, First Lady of the United States (b. 1775)
- March 10 – King Maximilian II of Bavaria (b. 1811)
- March 28 – Princess Louise Charlotte of Denmark (b. 1789)
- April 4 – Joseph Pitty Couthouy, American naval officer (b. 1808)
- April 14 – Charles Lot Church, Nova Scotia politician (b. 1777)
- April 30 – John B. Cocke, Confederate officer (in battle) (b. c. 1833)
- May 2 – Giacomo Meyerbeer, German composer (b. 1791)
- May 5 – Elizabeth Andrew Warren, Cornish botanist, marine algolologist (b. 1786)
- May 9
  - John Sedgwick, Union general, American Civil War (b. 1813)
  - Wilhelm Wolff, German political activist (b. 1809)
- May 12 – J. E. B. Stuart, Confederate general (in battle) (b. 1833)
- May 19 – Nathaniel Hawthorne, American author (b. 1804)
- May 20 – John Clare, Northamptonshire peasant poet (b. 1793)
- June 1 – Hong Xiuquan, Chinese rebel (b. 1814)
- June 4 – Matías Ramón Mella, Dominican general (b. 1816)
- June 13 – Henryk Dembiński, Polish engineer (b. 1791)
- June 14 – Patrick Kelly, U.S. Army officer (in battle) (b. c. 1822)
- June 15 – William E. Jones, Confederate general (in battle) (b. 1824)

=== July–December ===
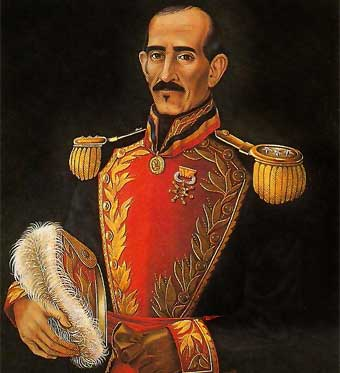
Juan José Flores

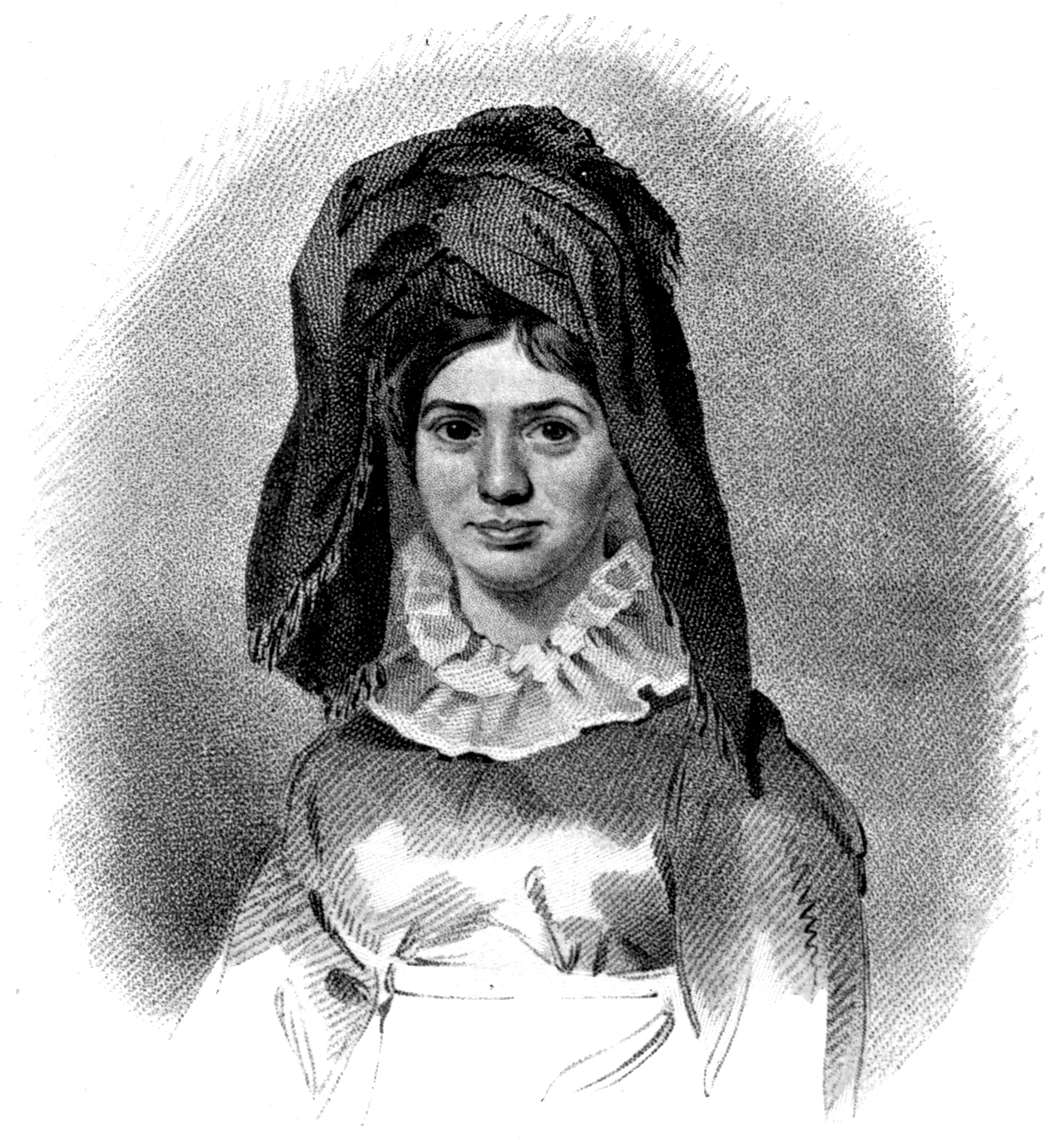
Princess Caraboo

- August 3 – Jakob Walter, German stonemason, common draftee (b. 1788)
- August 4 – David Hansemann, Prussian politician (b. 1790)
- August 19 – Trương Định, Vietnamese leader (suicide) (b. 1820)
- August 31 – Ferdinand Lassalle, Prussian-German philosopher, socialist and politician (b. 1825)
- September 3 – Emil Oskar Nobel, younger brother of Alfred Nobel (killed in an explosion) (b. 1843)
- October 1 – Juan José Flores, President of Ecuador (b. 1800)
- October 12 – Roger Taney, Chief Justice of the United States Supreme Court (b. 1777)
- November 6 – Tuanku Imam Bonjol, Indonesian religious and military leader (b. 1772)
- November 20 – Albert Newsam, American artist (born 1809)
- November 30
  - John Adams, Confederate general (in battle) (b. 1825)
  - Patrick Cleburne, Confederate general (in battle) (b. 1828)
  - States Rights Gist, Confederate general (in battle) (b. 1831)
- December 1 – William L. Dayton – United States Minister to France (b. 1807)
- December 8 – George Boole, English mathematician, philosopher (b. 1815)
- December 21 – Archduke Louis of Austria (b. 1784)
- December 23 – James Bronterre O'Brien, British Chartist (b. 1804)
- December 24 – Mary Baker (née Willcocks), aka Princess Caraboo (b. 1791)
- December 31 – George M. Dallas, U.S. Senator, 11th Vice President of the United States (b. 1792)

=== Date unknown ===
- Fu Shanxiang, Chinese scholar, Chancellor (b. 1833)
