= Mackrell =

Mackrell is a surname. Notable people with the surname include:

- Edwin Mackrell (1878–1965), Australian politician
- Gyles Mackrell DFC GM (1888–1959), British tea planter who organised a rescue of WW2 refugees
- John J. Mackrell (1879–1961), American lawyer and politician from New York
- Judith Mackrell (fl. 2026), English dance critic and biographer
- William Mackrell (1881–1917), New Zealand rugby footballer

== See also ==
- Charlton House, Charlton Mackrell, Grade II* listed house
- Charlton Mackrell, village in the civil parish of The Charltons, Somerset, England
- Mackel
- Mackell
- Mackerel
