= Eugene B. Van Camp =

- Born: March 31, 1838; Louisville, Kentucky, US
- Died: June 1904
- Known for: Member of the Rose O'Neal Greenhow Confederate spy ring

Eugene B. Van Camp (March 31, 1838 - June, 1904) was an espionage agent for the Confederate States of America during the American Civil War, assisting his father Dr. Aaron A. Van Camp in his spying activities.

== Early life and education ==
Eugene Bestor Van Camp was born on March 31, 1838, in Louisville, Kentucky. His parents were Maria Bestor Van Camp and the dentist Dr. Aaron A. Van Camp.

Van Camp attended St. Mary Seminary of St. Sulfice, now St. Mary's Seminary and University in Baltimore, Maryland, between 1848 and 1849.

Van Camp attended Georgetown College in Washington, D. C. between 1853 and 1855.

== Military service ==
On April 20, 1861, in Alexandria, Virginia, Van Camp enlisted in Captain Edward B. Powell's Company of Cavalry, which became Company F, 6th Regiment, Virginia Cavalry. Van Camp re-enlisted on April 20, 1862, and was promoted to third sergeant. He was wounded at an engagement in Strasburg, Virginia, and took convalescent leave in Winchester, Virginia, in the fall of 1862. Van Camp then went absent without leave on November 1, 1862, and was arrested in Berlin, Maryland, as a deserter. Van Camp was paroled and ordered to proceed to Baltimore and then stay north of Philadelphia for the duration of the war.

== Early spying activity ==
In April 1861 Van Camp became an orderly for General P. G. T. Beauregard before the First Battle of Bull Run. This allowed Van Camp and his father to assist Rose O'Neal Greenhow, who was operating a spy ring in the capital, in smuggling information pertaining to Union troop movements prior to that battle. Shortly thereafter, Greenhow's spy ring was broken up by Allan Pinkerton of the newly formed Union Intelligence Service. In late 1861, the elder Van Camp was imprisoned as suspected spy in downtown Washington in the Old Capitol Prison. Dr. Van Camp was released from custody in March 1862 after signing an oath of allegiance to the Union. His son was not arrested for assisting his father in the spy ring.

== Later spying activity ==
A confidential letter from a Union sympathizer to Secretary of War, Edwin Stanton, dated January 18, 1864, stated that Van Camp was in Vicksburg, Mississippi, and was believed to be a Confederate spy. The letter, written by "B. D. Hyam" of Memphis, Tennessee, indicated that Eugene Van Camp was assisting his father, a "suspected man" to purchase cotton, and that Eugene Van Camp was moving between Vicksburg and Memphis as a secret agent, gathering and conveying intelligence to the Rebels. "B. D. Hyam" was Benjamin Daniel Hyam (1813–1893), a Washington, D.C., lawyer involved in trading cotton with Aaron Van Camp in that area in 1863–1864. This led to a dispute between the two over an unpaid note. Each accused the other of disloyalty, and the matter was resolved by Union military authorities who found both Hyam and the senior Van Camp to be unworthy of belief

In April 1864 Dr. Van Camp arranged for Eugene Van Camp to secure a trading permit from Union commander General Stephen A. Hurlbut to open a store at Fort Pillow, Tennessee, three days before an attack upon it by troops led by Confederate general Nathan Bedford Forrest. It may be that this was a subterfuge to continue spying activities for the Rebels.

On April 12, 1864, General Forrest and his cavalry troops attacked Fort Pillow, whose 600 defenders were about evenly divided between white and black Union troops. Eugene Van Camp was one of the (civilian) defenders and had most of his left hand blown off by a Rebel minie ball. A massacre of the surrendering troops followed the taking of the fort. Eugene Van Camp survived and was evacuated to Memphis where Gen. Hurlbut personally ordered his wounds to be dressed. At the urging of an army surgeon, Dr. Van Camp arranged for Eugene to be sent to Illinois and later to Corning, New York to reside with relatives.

In April 1865, after Abraham Lincoln's assassination, an anonymous letter is sent to General Christopher C. Augur, who was investigating the conspiracy:

General C. C. Auger:

Aaron Van Camp has left the city to reside in Brooklyn or New York, to throw off the scent and where he can, he thinks, be lost in the crowd of a large city, as well as be near the workers with whom he has heretofore been operating with as also to be able to enjoy the ill gotten gains he has amassed. There would have been too much espionage on him here and too many questions asked. How he became rich so very, very suddenly from comparative poverty. See to him. Perhaps you may find him know to the late murder of our president and the assassin of Sec. Seward. His son is at Zimmerman's No. 71 Street near D.

'Truth'

There is a good likelihood this anonymous letter was written by Benjamin D. Hyam, a Washington, D.C., lawyer who was involved in a controversy with the elder Van Camp in Tennessee about one year earlier (see above). Both Hyam and Aaron Van Camp resided in Washington, D.C., in 1865, and would have been aware of each other's activities.

In response to the investigation into Lincoln's assassination and the above anonymous letter, Van Camp reported to investigators that his father was in West Virginia Looking after some oil lands there and that he did not know his father's exact whereabouts. Eugene indicated (probably untruthfully) that he was forced into service in the Rebel army, but correctly reported that he later defended against the attack at Ft. Pillow and was wounded there on April 12, 1864.

== Postwar activities ==
In the 1870s Van Camp accompanied father to Cuba in connection with his father's business interests there.

In 1900, Van Camp, aged 62, was living in San Diego, California, with his daughter, son in law and two grandchildren.

Van Camp died in San Diego, California in June 1904.
