= Mackell =

Mackell is a surname. Notable people with the surname include:

- Fleming Mackell (1929–2015), Canadian ice hockey player
- Jack Mackell (1896–1961), Canadian ice hockey player
- Thomas J. Mackell (1914–1992), American lawyer and politician

== See also ==
- Mackall
- Mackel
- Mackrell
