= Mackel =

Mackel is a surname. Notable people with the surname include:

- Billy Mackel (1912–1986), American jazz guitarist
- Ciarán Mackel (born 1955), Northern Irish architect
- Kathy Mackel (born 1950), American author and screenwriter

== See also ==
- Macke
- Mackell
- Macken (surname)
