= Mackall =

Mackall or MacKall is a surname. It is derived from the Gaelic MacCathail, meaning "son of Cathal". Early records of the name include M'Kawele in the late fourteenth-century, Makcaill in the early sixteenth century, and M'Call in the late sixteenth century.

== People with the surname ==
- Alexander Lawton Mackall (1888–1968), American author, journalist, gastronomy expert and critic
- Benjamin Mackall IV (1745–1807), American planter, lawyer, and jurist from Calvert County, Maryland
- Charles Mackall (1903–1991), American college football player and golfer
- Corinne Lawton Mackall (1880–1955), American painter, humanitarian, and gardener
- Crystal Mackall (born 1960), American physician and immunologist
- John Thomas MacKall (1920–1942), United States Army paratrooper
- Leonard Mackall (1879–1937), American historian
- Lily Mackall (c. 1839–1861), messenger for Rose Greenhow, a Confederate spy in the American Civil War
- R. Covington Mackall (1822–1902), American politician and physician
- Steve Mackall (born 1959), cartoon voice actor
- William W. Mackall (1817–1891), Confederate general in the American Civil War

== See also ==
- Camp Mackall, active U.S. Army training facility in eastern Richmond County and northern Scotland County, North Carolina
- Richards v. Mackall, 113 U.S. 539 (1885), appeal from the Supreme Court of the District of Columbia to the High Court
