= Macke =

Macke is a surname. Notable people with the surname include:

- Andreas Macke (born 1962), German physicist
- August Macke (1887–1914), German Expressionist painter
- Kenneth Macke (1938–2008), chairman and chief executive of the Dayton Hudson Corporation, the forerunner of Target Corporation
- Richard C. Macke (1938–2022), American naval officer
