= Rose O'Neal Greenhow =

Confederate spy during the American Civil War (1813–1864)

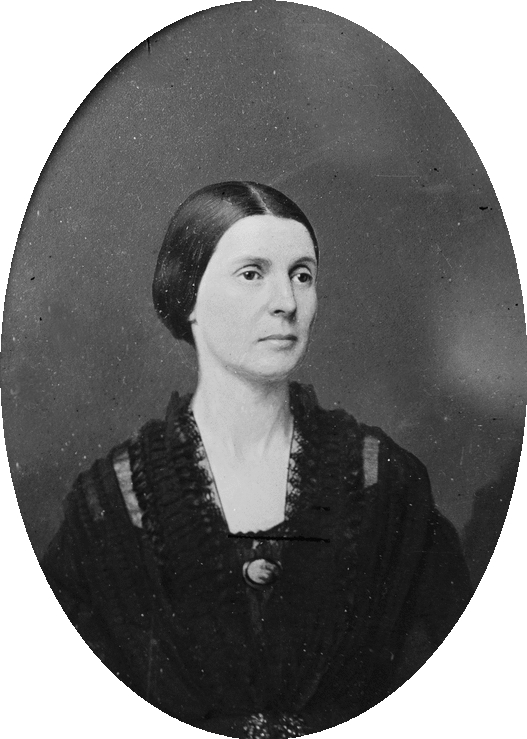
- Portrait, 1855–1864
- Born: 1813 or 1814; Montgomery County, Maryland
- Died: October 1, 1864 (aged 51); Cape Fear River, North Carolina
- Cause of death: Drowning

Rose O'Neal Greenhow (1813– October 1, 1864) was a Confederate spy during the American Civil War. A socialite in Washington, D.C., during the period before the war, she moved in important political circles and cultivated friendships with presidents, generals, senators, and high-ranking military officers including John C. Calhoun and James Buchanan. She used her connections to pass along key military information to the Confederacy at the start of the war. In early 1861, she was given control of a pro-Southern spy network in Washington, D.C., by her handler, Thomas Jordan, then a captain in the Confederate Army. She was credited by Jefferson Davis, the Confederate president, with ensuring the South's victory at the First Battle of Bull Run in late July 1861.

The government found that information was being leaked and the trail led to Rose Greenhow's residence. As punishment, Greenhow was subject to house arrest; found to have continued her activities, in 1862 after an espionage hearing, she, with her daughter "Little Rose", was jailed for nearly five months in Washington, D.C., and deported to the Confederacy. She traveled to Richmond, Virginia, and began new tasks. Running the blockade, she sailed to Europe to represent the Confederacy on a diplomatic mission to France and Britain from 1863 to 1864. In 1863, she also wrote and published her memoir in London, which was popular in Britain. In 1864 off the coast of Wilmington, North Carolina, when Greenhow and other sailors saw a Yankee Craft pursuing their ship, Greenhow demanded a lifeboat for her and two other Confederates. She had gotten gold from the book she had written, and her money was sewn into her dress. When the other boat was driven to the ground, her lifeboat flipped, because she was weighed down by $2,000 worth of gold sewn into her underclothes and hung around her neck and she drowned. She was honored with a Confederate military funeral.

In 1993, the women's auxiliary of the Sons of Confederate Veterans changed its name to the Order of the Confederate Rose in Greenhow's honor, following publicity about her exploits in a TV movie the previous year.

== Early life ==
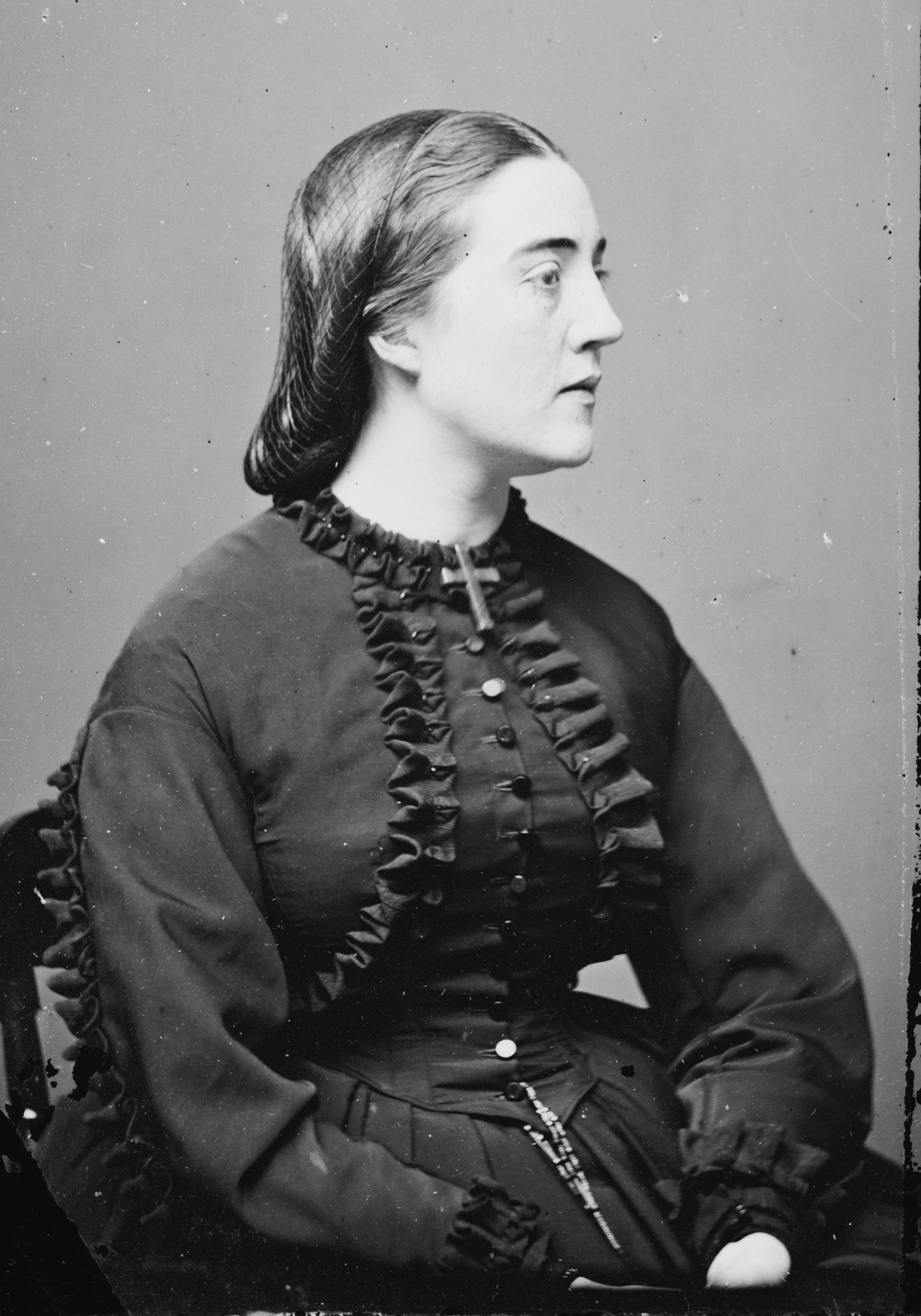
Adele Cutts, c. 1860

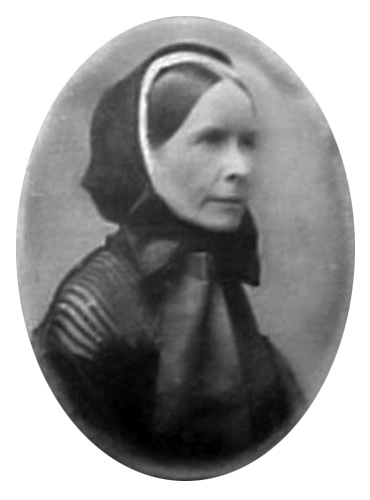
Mary Greenhow Lee

She was born in 1813 as Maria Rosetta O'Neale on a small plantation in Montgomery County, Maryland, northwest of Washington, D.C. (Note: The biographical note on Greenhow at the National Archives and Records Administration, which holds a collection of her papers, says that O'Neal was born in 1817 in Port Tobacco, Maryland, but it is unclear what the documentation is for this.) She was the third of five daughters of John O'Neale, a planter and slaveholder, and his wife Eliza Henrietta Hamilton, who were Catholic. Called Rose as a child, O'Neal was the third born and close to her next older sister, Ellen (Mary Eleanor) and the final "e" was dropped off the family name in Rose's early childhood. Their father died in 1817, murdered by his black valet. His widow, Eliza O'Neal, had four daughters to support and a cash-poor farm.

After being orphaned as children, Greenhow and her sister Ellen were invited to live with their aunt in Washington, D.C., around the year 1830. Their aunt, Mrs. Maria Ann Hill, ran a stylish boarding house at the Old Capitol Building (later the Old Capitol Prison) and the girls met many important figures in the Washington area. Her olive skin "delicately flushed with color" earned her the nickname "Wild Rose."

In the 1830s, she met Robert Greenhow Jr., a prominent doctor, lawyer, and linguist from Virginia. Their courtship was well received by Washington society, including famed society matron Dolley Madison. In 1833, Greenhow's sister Ellen O'Neal married Dolley's nephew James Madison Cutts. In 1856, their daughter Adele Cutts married the widower Stephen A. Douglas, the senator from Illinois.

== Marriage and family ==
In 1835, Rose married Dr. Robert Greenhow Jr. with Dolley's blessing, and by the 1850s had long been an established socialite in the capital. Robert Greenhow worked at the U.S. Department of State. Robert's step-sister, Mary Greenhow Lee, would visit him and Greenhow and the two women became close friends.

The Greenhows had four daughters: Florence, Gertrude, Leila, and Rose. Their youngest child was named Rose O'Neal Greenhow (her middle name being her mother's maiden), and was nicknamed "Little Rose". In 1871, Little Rose married Army officer William P. Duvall. They were the parents of two children, son William (died 1874) and daughter Lee, who later took the name Mary and was the wife of Louis Eugene Marié. The Duvalls divorced in 1899.

Robert's work with the State Department prompted the family to move with him to Mexico City in 1850 and then to San Francisco, California. In 1852, Greenhow returned East with her children, a journey of months, giving birth to her last daughter in 1853. Her husband died in an accident in San Francisco in 1854. Being a widow did not disrupt Greenhow's popularity in the capital. A short time later, their oldest child Florence married Seymour Treadwell Moore, a West Point graduate, career army officer, and Mexican War veteran. The couple moved west to Ohio.

== Confederate spy ==
Thomas Jordan

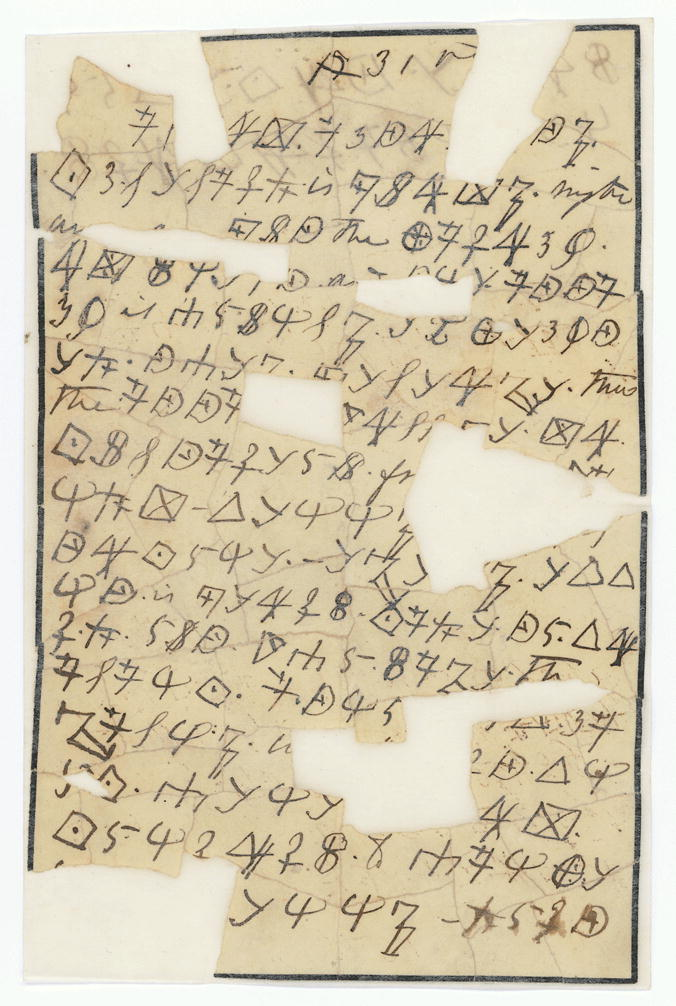
An example of Greenhow's cipher

After losing her husband, Greenhow became more sympathetic to the Confederate cause. Greenhow was an advocate for secession and "preserving the Southern way of life," including slavery. She was strongly influenced by her friendship with U.S. Senator John C. Calhoun from South Carolina. Greenhow's loyalty to the Confederacy was noted by those with similar sympathies in Washington, and she was recruited as a spy. Her recruiter was U.S. Army captain Thomas Jordan, who had set up a pro-Southern spy network in Washington. He supplied her with a 26-symbol cipher for encoding messages.

After passing control of the espionage network to Greenhow, Jordan left the US Army, went South, and was commissioned as a captain in the Confederate Army. He continued to receive and evaluate her reports. Jordan appeared to be Greenhow's handler for the Confederate Secret Service during its formative phase.

On July 9 and July 16 of 1861, Greenhow passed secret messages to Confederate General P. G. T. Beauregard containing critical information regarding Union military movements for what would be the First Battle of Bull Run, including the plans of General Irvin McDowell. Assisting in her conspiracy were pro-Confederate members of Congress, Union officers, courier Betty Duvall, and her dentist, Aaron Van Camp, as well as his son who was also a Confederate soldier, Eugene B. Van Camp. Confederate President Jefferson Davis credited Greenhow's information with the Confederates securing victory at Manassas over the Union Army on July 21.

After the battle she received the following telegram from Jordan: "Our President and our General direct me to thank you. We rely upon you for further information. The Confederacy owes you a debt". (Signed) JORDAN, Adjutant-General." She became known as "Rebel Rose" for her work for the South.

=== Capture and prison ===
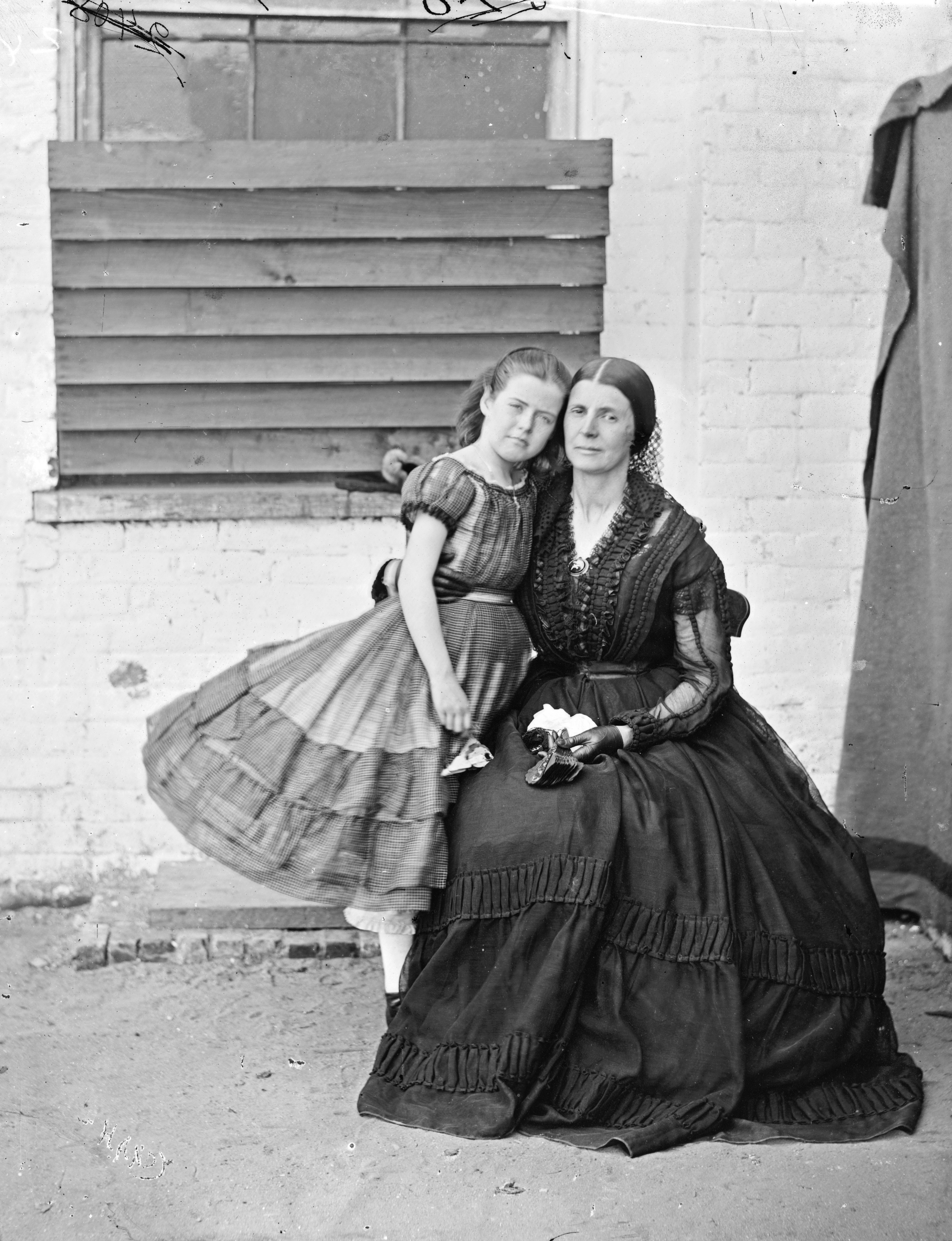
Rose O'Neal Greenhow with her youngest daughter and namesake, "Little" Rose, at the Old Capitol Prison, Washington, D.C., 1862

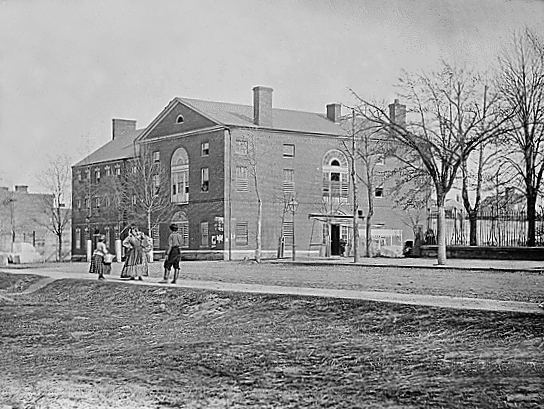
The Old Capitol Building as a prison

Knowing she was suspected of spying for the Confederacy, Greenhow feared for her remaining daughters' safety. Leila was sent to Ohio to join her older sister Florence Greenhow Moore, whose husband Seymour Treadwell Moore had become a captain in the Union Army. (He was breveted a brigadier general in May 1865 for his services and achieved a rank of lieutenant colonel after the war in his army career.) Only Little Rose stayed with Greenhow in Washington.

Allan Pinkerton was made head of the recently formed Secret Service and one of his first orders was to watch Greenhow, because of her wide circle of contacts on both sides of the sectional split. Due to the activities of visitors, he arrested Greenhow and placed her under house arrest at her 16th Street residence on August 23, 1861, along with one of her couriers, Lily Mackall. His agents traced other leaked information to Greenhow's home. While searching her house, Pinkerton and his men found extensive intelligence materials left from evidence she tried to burn, including scraps of coded messages, copies of what amounted to eight reports to Jordan over a month's time, and maps of Washington fortifications and notes on military movements.

The materials included numerous love letters supposedly from the abolitionist Republican U.S. Senator Henry Wilson from Massachusetts. She considered him her prize source, and claimed he gave her data on the "number of heavy guns and other artillery in the Washington defenses," but he likely knew far more from his work on the Military Affairs Committee. The seized Greenhow papers are now held by the National Archives and Records Administration, with some available online. Contemporary biographers of Wilson have regarded the letters as likely not sent by Wilson as his handwriting and signature do not match those in the letters.

Pinkerton supervised visitors to Greenhow's house and moved other suspected Southern sympathizers into it, giving rise to the nickname Fort Greenhow. He was pleased to oversee the visitors and messages, as it gave him more control of the Southern flow of information. While messages continued to be sent to Jordan, he discounted them after Pinkerton mounted his control. When a letter from Greenhow to Seward complained of her treatment was publicized, there was Northern criticism for what was perceived as too lenient treatment of a spy. Pinkerton transferred Greenhow on January 18, 1862, to Old Capitol Prison, shutting down Fort Greenhow. So many political prisoners were detained that a two-man commission was set up to review their cases at what were called espionage hearings. Greenhow was never subjected to trial. Her youngest daughter, "Little Rose", then eight years old, was permitted to stay with her.

Greenhow continued to pass along messages while imprisoned. Passers-by could see Rose's window from the street. Historians believe that the position of the blinds and number of candles burning in the window had special meaning to the "little birdies" passing by. Another account lists her prison room facing the prison yard "so that she could not see or be seen" and "every effort was made to keep Mrs. Greenhow away from the windows." Greenhow also on one occasion flew the Confederate Flag from her prison window.

== International acclaim ==
On May 31, 1862, Greenhow was released without trial (with her daughter), on condition she stay within Confederate boundaries. After they were escorted to Fortress Monroe at Hampton Roads, she and her daughter went on to Richmond, Virginia, where Greenhow was hailed by Southerners as a heroine. President Jefferson Davis welcomed her return and enlisted her as a courier to Europe. Greenhow ran the blockade and, from 1863 to 1864, traveled through France and Britain on a diplomatic mission building support for the Confederacy with the aristocrats.

Many European aristocrats had sympathy for the South's elite; there were also strong commercial ties between Britain and the South. While in France, Greenhow was received in the court of Napoleon III at the Tuileries. In Britain, she had an audience with Queen Victoria. Greenhow met, and in 1864 became engaged to, Granville Leveson-Gower, 2nd Earl Granville. The details of her mission to Europe are recorded in her personal diaries, dated August 5, 1863, to August 10, 1864, when she wrote, "A sad sick feeling crept over me, of parting perhaps forever, from many dear to me...A few months before I had landed a stranger--I will not say in a foreign land--for it was the land of my ancestors--and many memories twined around my heart when my feet touched the shores of Merry England--but I was literally a stranger in the land of my fathers and a feeling of cold isolation was upon me."

Two months after arriving in London, Greenhow wrote her memoir, titled My Imprisonment and the First Year of Abolition Rule at Washington. She published it that year in London and it sold well throughout Britain.

== Death ==
On August 19, 1864, Greenhow left Europe to return to the Confederacy, carrying dispatches. She traveled on the Condor, a British blockade runner. On October 1, 1864, the Condor ran aground at the mouth of the Cape Fear River near Wilmington, North Carolina, while being pursued by the Union gunboat USS Niphon. Fearing capture and reimprisonment, Greenhow fled the grounded ship by rowboat. A wave capsized the rowboat, and Greenhow drowned. She was weighed down by $2,000 worth of gold sewn into her underclothes and hung around her neck, returns from her memoir royalties.

When Greenhow's body was recovered from the water near Wilmington, searchers found a small notebook and a copy of her book Imprisonment hidden on her. Inside the book was a note meant for her daughter, Little Rose. She was honored with a military funeral at St. Thomas the Apostle Catholic Church in Wilmington, North Carolina, and the Ladies Memorial Association, in 1888, marked her grave in Oakdale Cemetery with a cross that read "Mrs. Rose O'Neal Greenhow. A Bearer of Dispatches to the Confederate Government."

== Legacy ==
- Since the mid-20th century, two biographies have been published about Greenhow.
- Greenhow was a featured character played by Nina Foch in an episode of the 1961 NBC TV series The Americans, The Rebellious Rose.
- Greenhow's exploits were dramatized in the 1990 television film The Rose and the Jackal, in which she was played by Madolyn Smith.
- Greenhow was a featured character played by Sue-Ann Leeds in the 1993 television drama Class of '61.
- In 1993, the women's auxiliary of the Sons of Confederate Veterans changed its name to the Order of the Confederate Rose in her honor.
- In The Pinkertons episode "The Better Angels of Our Nature", Greenhow's daughter (named Leila in the episode) is about to publish a scandalous biography of her late mother. The book's publisher is murdered in an attempt to steal the manuscript.
