= 1864 Stifone explosion =

The Stifone powder magazine explosion was an accident that occurred during the night between 22 and 23 January 1864 in the village of Stifone, near Narni, Italy, along the section of railway then under construction between Narni and Orte.

The explosion, caused by the careless storage of gunpowder intended for railway works, destroyed most of the village and killed 12 people.

== Explosion ==
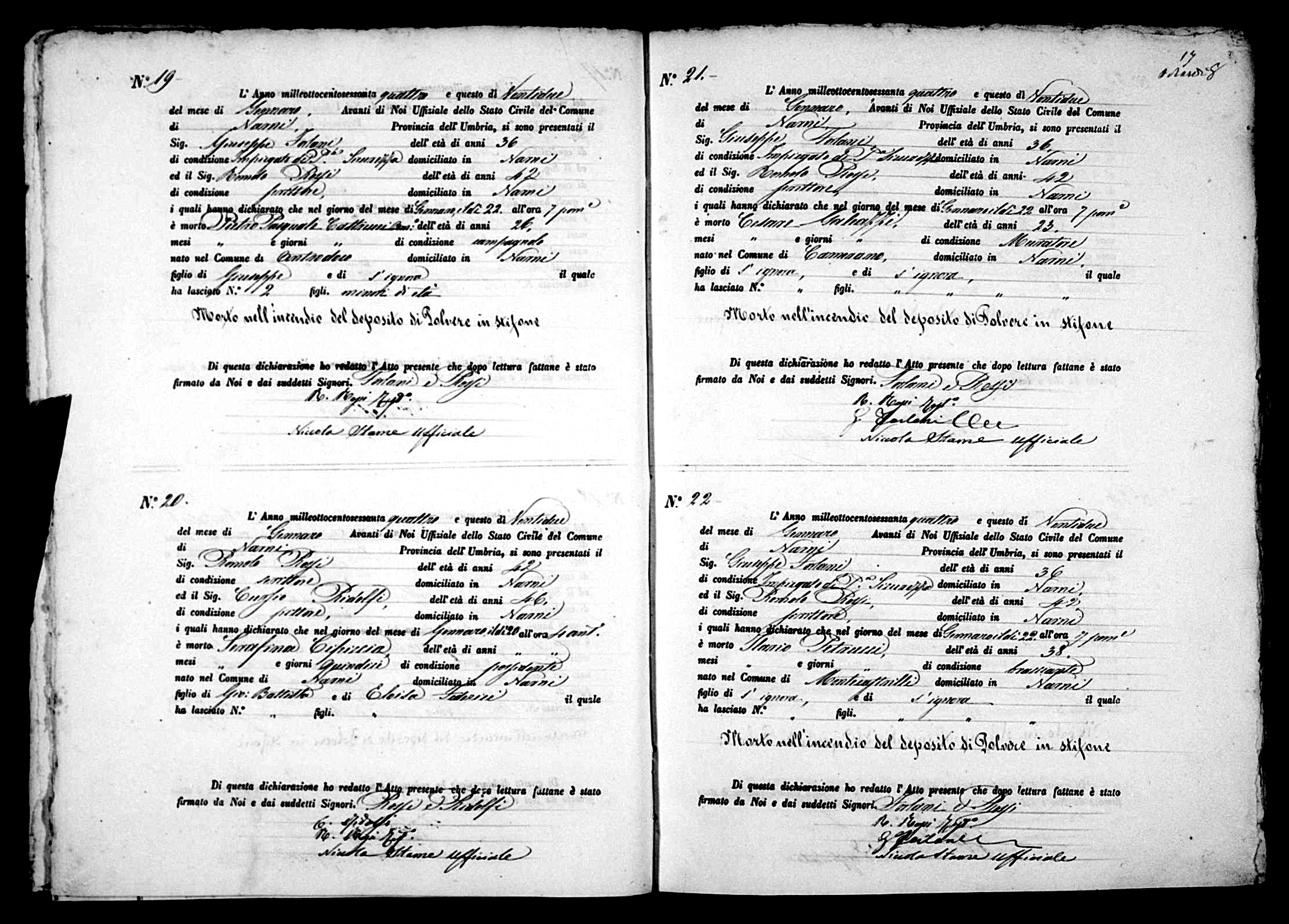
Pages from the civil register of Narni recording some of the deaths from the 1864 Stifone explosion

In 1864, the Narni–Orte railway section was under construction. The works had been contracted to a French entrepreneur named Lelarge, who owned a small company operating on a piecework basis. His wife, Madame Lelarge, managed both a provisions warehouse and a small inn that was popular with engineers and railway workers.

In the cellar of the inn, a store of over 800 kilograms (1,800 lb) of black powder and several dozen meters of fuse was kept for use in blasting the railway cuttings. Every morning, workers collected powder and fuses from the cellar, carrying them through the kitchen and dining room. Over time, a thick layer of powder residue mixed with mud and ash accumulated on the floor, forming what was later described as a "natural fuse".

On the evening of 22 January 1864, Lelarge, his wife, their nephew, and a few colleagues were dining and playing cards in the kitchen. To warm the room, Lelarge placed a metal tub filled with hot embers near the table. The bottom of the container became red-hot and ignited the layer of gunpowder dust on the floor, with the fire rapidly reaching the cellar below where the main supply was stored.

The explosion destroyed much of Stifone and shattered windows in nearby villages. Engineer Candido Valli, one of the first to arrive, reported 12 confirmed deaths and dozens of injuries, including many children, out of a population of about 160 inhabitants at the time. Everyone present in the inn was killed, except for Lelarge himself, who was found unharmed in the village square, reportedly thrown there by the blast.

A contemporary report published in the newspaper L'Opinione on 27 February 1864 gives a somewhat different version. According to this report, the accident occurred around 7 p.m. on 22 January when Mr. Lorgier, nephew and agent of the contractor Lalarge, was writing in a room with a lit cigar and lamp where about 160 cartridges of blasting powder (approximately 500 lb or 230 kg) had been temporarily stored for railway works. A spark apparently ignited the powder, causing an explosion that completely destroyed the house, killed forty people, and injured seven others. Troops from the 4th Regiment of the Sardinian Grenadiers and the Guides Regiment arrived from Narni to assist in rescue efforts, recovering victims and aiding survivors.

== Aftermath ==
During the clearing of the ruins, rescuers discovered several spools of thread that had belonged to Madame Lelarge. Inside each were found twenty-five Napoléons d’or — gold coins representing her life savings, which had been hidden before the accident.

The event was later recounted by Candido Valli in his memoirs of early Italian railway construction, describing the dangers of using explosives at the time. The explosion is also mentioned in Giuseppe Fortunati’s Personaggi e racconti di Narni, which retells the episode in a partly humorous and folkloric style, though it incorrectly dates it to 1861 rather than 1864.
