= Andreas Macke =

German physicist

Andreas Macke (born 1962) is a German physicist. He is Professor for Atmospheric physics at University of Leipzig and is working at the Leibniz-Institut für Troposphärenforschung (TROPOS).

Andreas Macke studied physics at the University of Cologne, received his Ph.D. in geosciences from the University of Hamburg and habilitated in meteorology at the Christian-Albrecht University of Kiel. Today he heads the department Remote Sensing of Atmospheric Processes at TROPOS.

He and his working group are researching light scattering on non-spherical particles in the atmosphere, the three-dimensional radiation transport in mixed phase clouds and process radiation effects of clouds in the model. Macke's observations of the marine troposphere from the ship are technically demanding.
