= Lily Mackall =

- Born: c. 1839
- Died: December 12, 1861 (aged 21–22); Washington, D.C., U.S.
- Burial place: Oak Hill Cemetery; Washington, D.C., U.S.

Lily Mackall (sometimes, Lillie Mackall) (c. 1839 – December 12, 1861) was a messenger for Rose Greenhow, a Confederate spy during the American Civil War. Arrested with Greenhow, they were held under house arrest, although Mackall was allowed to leave freely and used this to smuggle out some of the most sensitive documents in her shoes. The pair were then confined in a single room, along with Greenhow's daughter. Greenhow noted that during this time, she and Mackall were "like Siamese twins, inseparable". On September 25, 1861, Mackall was ordered out of the house and prohibited from returning, on the direct orders of Allan Pinkerton; she fell ill in October, and eventually died, with Greenhow being prohibited from seeing her. She was buried at Oak Hill Cemetery in Washington, D.C.

== Bibliography ==
- Bakeless, John (2011). Spies of the Confederacy. Courier Dover Publications. ISBN 978-0486298658.
- Blackman, Ann (2006). Wild Rose: The True Story of a Civil War Spy. Random House Trade Paperbacks. ISBN 9780812970456.
- Sullivan, Walter (2003). The War the Women Lived. J.S. Sanders Books. ISBN 9781461632818.
