= Old Brick Capitol =

Temporary US Capitol building in Washington, D.C. (1815–1819)

Coordinates: 38°53′25″N 77°00′16″W

- Part of American Civil War prison camps
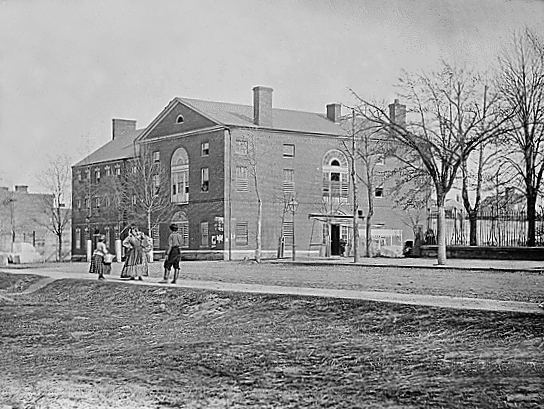
- The Old Brick Capitol building as a prison during the American Civil War, 1861–1865

Site information
- Type: United States Capitol (1815–1819); Union prison camp (1861–1865)
- Owner: U.S. federal government
- Controlled by: Union Army
- Open to the public: no

Site history
- Built: 1815
- In use: 1815–1819; 1861–1867
- Materials: brick
- Demolished: 1929
- Battles/wars: American Civil War

Garrison information
- Occupants: Union soldiers, Confederate prisoners of war, political prisoners, spies, Union officers convicted of insubordination, and local D.C. prostitutes

The Old Brick Capitol in Washington, D.C., served as the temporary meeting place of the Congress of the United States from 1815 to 1819, while the Capitol Building was rebuilt after the burning of Washington in late 1814.

"Old Brick" was used as a private school, a boarding house, and, during the American Civil War, a prison known as the Old Capitol Prison. It was demolished in 1929 to be replaced by the U.S. Supreme Court building.

== Site history ==
The site was located on Capitol Hill and was acquired from the Carroll family to accommodate the U.S. Capitol. Located at 1st and A streets NE in Washington, D.C., on the eastern slope of Capitol Hill, the site's first building was a red brick tavern and hostel called Stelle's Hotel, built around 1800. It was part of a neighborhood of rooming houses catering to the U.S. Congress.

=== Temporary U.S. Capitol, 1815–1819 ===
In August 1814, during the War of 1812, the British burned the nearby United States Capitol building. The Congress, forced to meet in temporary quarters, pulled down the hostel at 1st and A streets, and built a temporary brick capitol building in the Federal style, laying the cornerstone on July 4, 1815. Congress then occupied the brick capitol from December 8, 1815, until 1819, while the original U.S. Capitol Building was rebuilt. The first inauguration of President James Monroe took place at the brick capitol on March 4, 1817.

The building was actually financed by Washington real-estate investors, who had heard rumors that some members of Congress were considering relocation of the national capital in the aftermath of the burning. The investors wanted to prevent their land values from decreasing by keeping the government in Washington.

=== Old Brick Capitol, 1819–1861 ===
The building acquired the title "Old Brick Capitol" in 1819 when Congress and the Supreme Court returned to the restored U.S. Capitol Building. Until the time of the Civil War, the building was used as a private school, then as a boarding house. South Carolina Senator and former Vice President of the United States John C. Calhoun, who had been a leading member of the Fourteenth Congress when it met in the Old Brick Capitol, died in the boarding house in 1850.

=== Old Capitol Prison, 1861–1867 ===
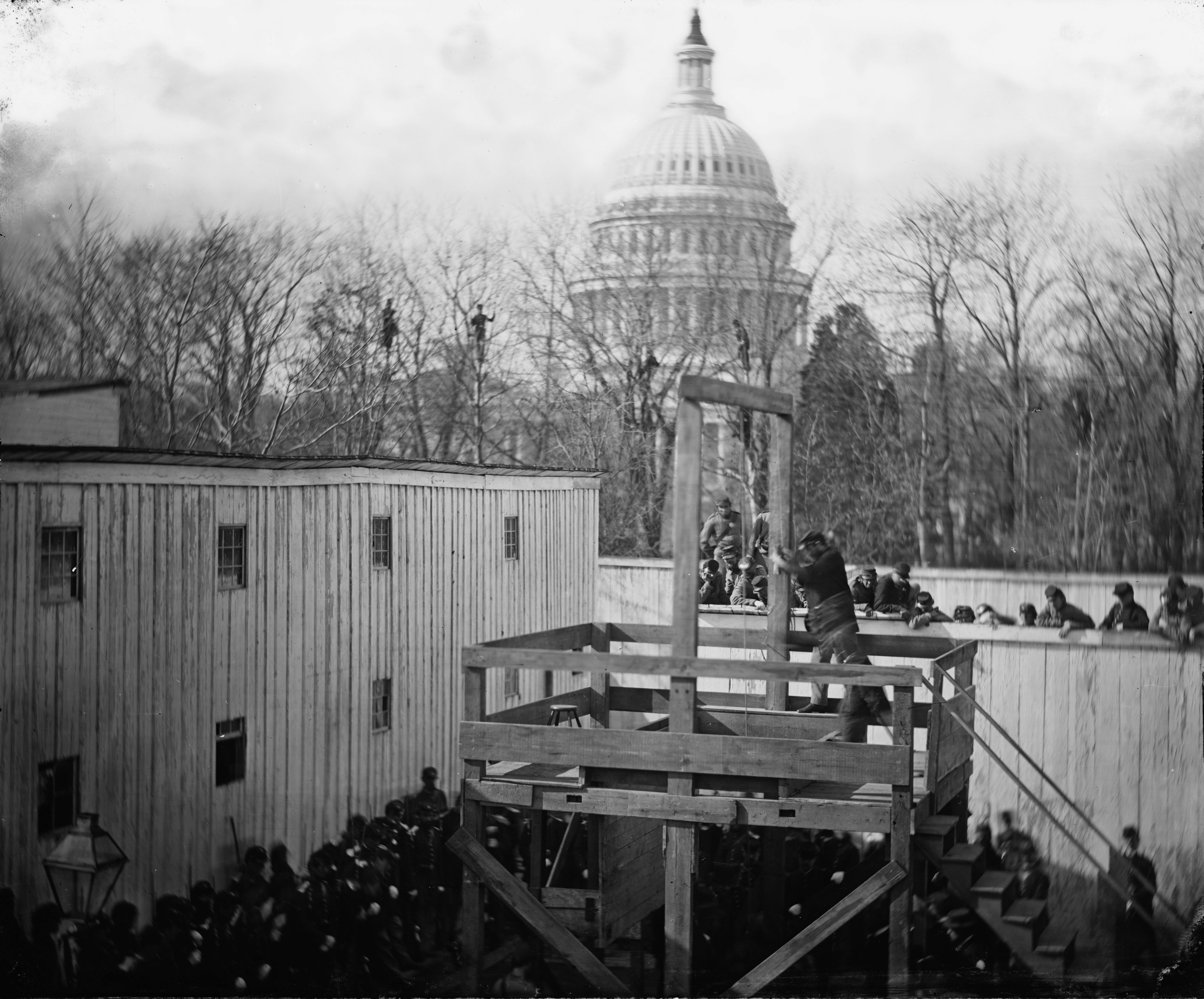
The 1865 execution of convicted Civil War war criminal Henry Wirz near the U.S. Capitol moments after the trap door was sprung.

With the start of the Civil War in 1861, the Union repurchased the building to use as a prison for captured Confederates, as well as political prisoners, spies, Union officers convicted of insubordination, and local prostitutes. Famous inmates of the prison included Rose Greenhow, Belle Boyd, John Mosby, and Henry Wirz, who was hanged in the yard of the prison.

Many people arrested following the assassination of President Abraham Lincoln were also held here. These included Dr. Samuel Mudd, Mary Surratt, Louis Weichmann, and John T. Ford, owner of Ford's Theater, where Lincoln was shot. The adjoining row of houses, Duff Green's Row, was also used as part of the prison.

=== Post-War use and demolition ===
The government sold the Old Capitol Prison in 1867 to George T. Brown, then sergeant-at-arms of the U.S. Senate, who modified the building into three rowhouses collectively known as "Trumbull's Row." In the 20th century, they were used as the headquarters of the National Woman's Party. In 1929, the site was acquired by eminent domain and the brick building was razed to clear the site for the U.S. Supreme Court Building.

== See also ==
- List of Civil War POW prisons and camps
