= Black Dispatches =

American Civil War military intelligence

Black Dispatches was a common term used among Union military men in the American Civil War for intelligence on Confederate forces provided by African Americans, who often were slaves aiding the Union forces. They knew the terrain and could move within many areas without being noticed; their information represented a prolific and productive category of intelligence obtained and acted on by Union forces throughout the Civil War.

Black Dispatches resulted from frontline tactical debriefings of slaves—either runaways or those having just come under Union control. Black Americans also contributed to tactical and strategic Union intelligence through behind-the-lines missions and agent-in-place operations. Two such Union agents functioned as part of as Confederate President Jefferson Davis's "White House" staff in Richmond, Virginia. Even such a prominent woman as Harriet Tubman, best known for her activities involving the Underground Railroad, played an important role in Union intelligence activities.

All the following groups, which aided the Union effort, were minor compared to the quality of intelligence provided by black slaves. There were Union sympathizers who were members of the following groups: Orders of the Heroes of America, the Peace and Constitutional Society, organized in Arkansas; and the Peace Society, which existed in Alabama, East Tennessee, Georgia, Mississippi, and perhaps even Florida that furnished the majority of intelligence that were verified by the network of northern spies that infiltrated the South. These groups consisted of Catholic, Methodist, Quakers, Jewish and other religious groups with relatives in the north where they funnelled the intelligence.

The value of the information that could be obtained, both passively and actively, by black Americans behind Confederate lines was clearly understood by most Union generals from early in the war. A stream of articles and stories in the Northern press during the war highlighted the important role of southern African Americans. Gen. Robert E. Lee, commander of the Confederate Army of Northern Virginia, was equally aware, and in May 1863 he said, "The chief source of information to the enemy is through our Negroes." Because of the culture of slavery in the South, Negroes involved in menial activities could move about without suspicion. Also, officials and officers tended to ignore their presence as personal servants when discussing war-related matters. Confederate General Patrick Cleburne explained the problem in a letter to Confederate high command, complaining "All along the lines slavery is comparatively valueless to us for labor, but of great and increasing worth to the enemy for information. It is an omnipresent spy system, pointing out our valuable men to the enemy, revealing our positions, purposes, and resources, and yet acting so safely and secretly that there is no means to guard against it. Even in the heart of our country, where our hold upon this secret espionage is firmest, it waits but the opening fire of the enemy's battle line to wake it, like a torpid serpent, into venomous activity."

After the war, however, the intelligence contributions of black Americans began to be lost to history. While racial prejudice probably played a part in this, as it did regarding the military contributions of black American Union military units, several other factors added to this lack of recognition. Historically, most successful spies do not want their identities made public. Even individuals who may have provided one-time pieces of useful intelligence usually prefer anonymity. This was particularly true in the emotional period after the Civil War, when many of these black Americans lived near people who had not given up their insurgency and were intent on imposing white supremacy on blacks.

Neither side had many official records related to their intelligence activities, having been reluctant to document them, for the above reasons of secrecy. Many records were purposely destroyed to protect those involved and still living. Before fleeing Richmond in 1865, the Confederate Secretary of War ordered the destruction of virtually all intelligence files, including counter-intelligence records regarding Union spies.

In Washington, the War Department turned over portions of its intelligence files to many of the participants involved. Most of these records were subsequently destroyed or lost. Thus, accounts by individuals of their parts in the war, or official papers focusing on larger subjects, such as military official correspondence, have become important sources of information on intelligence activities. Due to the lack of supporting documents, much of this information is difficult to substantiate or place in perspective and context.

== George Scott ==
George Scott, an escaped slave, provided information that helped lead to one of the first large-scale battles of the war. He furnished intelligence on Confederate fortifications and troop movements to Gen. Benjamin F. Butler, commander of Fort Monroe located at the mouth of the James River on the tip of the Virginia Peninsula. Shortly after the start of the war, Butler had issued orders that all "contraband" arriving in Union lines be brought to his headquarters for debriefing.

Scott had escaped from a plantation near Yorktown. While making his way toward Fort Monroe, he observed that Confederate forces had thrown up two fortifications between Yorktown and the fortress. Butler's officers were impressed with Scott's information but wanted to confirm it. Scott agreed to accompany a Union officer on several scouting trips behind Confederate lines to obtain more specific intelligence. On one of these missions, Scott barely avoided being wounded by a Confederate picket; the bullet went through his jacket.

Based on the intelligence gained from these missions, Butler determined that Confederate forces were planning an attack on Newport News, capture of which would isolate Fort Monroe from Union resupply. He ordered a preemptive attack on the Confederate position, but the military operation was poorly conducted and ended in a Union defeat.

== John Scobell ==
As the number of Union forces increased, requiring better organization, Maj. Gen. George B. McClellan was appointed as commander of the Army of the Potomac defending Washington. He brought with him as his chief of intelligence Allan Pinkerton, who had gained some renown running a Chicago detective agency. Pinkerton, often using the alias Major Allen or E. J. Allen, had responsibilities for collecting intelligence on the enemy and for counterintelligence activities against enemy agents. He gained most of his intelligence by conducting an extensive and well-organized debriefing program of people crossing over from Confederate lines. These informants included merchants with business ties on both sides, deserters from the Confederate Army, prisoners of war, civilians traveling to escape the fighting or for other personal business, and former slaves. While each group provided valuable information, Pinkerton soon discovered that the former slaves were the most willing to cooperate and often had the best knowledge of Confederate fortifications, camps, and supply points.

Pinkerton instructed his operatives to focus their efforts on debriefing former slaves. He also directed them to be on the lookout for former slaves who had some education or seemed particularly skilled in observing and remembering military details. Once these individuals were identified, they were sent to Pinkerton for further assessment and evaluation. From these black Americans, Pinkerton recruited a small number for intelligence collection missions behind Confederate lines.

John Scobell was recruited in the fall of 1861 and became the best-known of the Pinkerton black agents. As a slave in Mississippi, Scobell had been well educated by his owner, a Scotsman who subsequently freed him. He was quick-witted and an accomplished role player, which permitted him to function in several different identities on various missions, including food vendor, cook, or laborer. He often worked with other Pinkerton agents, sometimes playing the role of their servant while in the South. He worked with Timothy Webster, perhaps Pinkerton's best agent, on missions into Virginia and also with Mrs. Hattie Lawton, Pinkerton's best female operative.

Scobell is credited with providing valuable intelligence on Confederate order of battle, status of supplies, and troop morale and movements. Frequently, while the white Pinkerton agents elicited information from Confederate officials and officers, Scobell would seek out leaders in the black community and collect their information on local conditions, fortifications, and troop dispositions.

Scobell often used his membership in the "Legal League," a clandestine Negro organization in the South supporting freedom for slaves, to acquire local information. League members sometimes supported Scobell's collection activities by acting as couriers to carry his information to Union lines. On at least one occasion, as described by Pinkerton, Scobell protected the escape of Mrs. Lawton from pursuing Confederate agents. He worked for Pinkerton from late 1861 until the intelligence chief closed down his operations in November 1862, when McClellan was replaced by Gen. Ambrose E. Burnside.

According to Corey Recko, historians have not been able to discover proof that slave/spy John Scobell existed. He may have been a fictional character created by Allan Pinkerton for his book The Spy of the Rebellion.

== Riverboat spy ==
W. H. Ringgold was a free person of color who worked on a riverboat on the York River in Virginia. He had been "impressed" (coerced) into service as a result of having been in Fredericksburg at the time Virginia seceded from the Union. Ringgold spent six months on the river, helping move troops and supplies on the Virginia peninsula. When his ship was damaged by a storm, he and the other crewmen were permitted to travel to the North by way of Maryland's Eastern Shore. On reaching Baltimore, he sought out Union officials, who immediately sent him to Pinkerton in Washington.

In December 1861, Ringgold provided Pinkerton with detailed intelligence on Confederate defenses on the peninsula. This included locations of fortifications and artillery batteries, troop concentrations, and defenses on the York River. His information was the best McClellan received before the start of his Peninsula Campaign in March 1862. It was the basis for much of his strategic planning for the opening of that campaign.

== Naval intelligence ==
Black Americans provided equally valuable intelligence to the Union Navy. Mary Louvestre, a freed slave, worked in Norfolk as a housekeeper for an engineer who was involved in the refitting and transformation of the USS Merrimack into the Virginia, the first Confederate ironclad warship. Overhearing the engineer talking about the importance of his project, she recognized the danger this new type of ship represented to the Union navy blockading Norfolk. She stole a set of plans for the ship which the engineer had brought home and fled North. After a dangerous trip, she arrived in Washington, DC and arranged a meeting with officials at the Department of the Navy.

The stolen plans and Louvestre's verbal report of the status of the ship's construction convinced the officials of the need to speed up construction of the Union's own ironclad, the USS Monitor. The Virginia destroyed two Union frigates, the USS Congress and the USS Cumberland, and ran another, the USS Minnesota, to ground before the Union ironclad was completed and reached forces for the war. If Louvestre had not given her intelligence, the Virginia may have had several more unchallenged weeks to destroy Union ships blockading Hampton Roads. The risk was that the Confederates could have opened the port of Norfolk to urgently needed supplies from Europe.

== Robert Smalls ==
The strategic Confederate port of Charleston, South Carolina was one of the few in the south with railroad lines capable of speedy transportation of supplies to Richmond and other key Confederate manufacturing and supply centers. In March 1862, Robert Smalls, a free black, rowed out to a Union warship that was part of a large fleet assembled to attack the seacoast town of Fernandina, Florida. He reported that Confederate troops were preparing to evacuate the town as well as Amelia Island, which guarded the approach to Fernandina. Smalls, a harbor pilot, had observed Confederate preparations to destroy the town's harbor facilities during the withdrawal.

Smalls understood the importance of keeping the Fernandina harbor operable as a logistics facility and base for Union operations against Charleston. Based on the intelligence he provided, Union forces attacked Fernandina and routed the enemy's rear guard before the Confederates could sabotage the harbor. The intelligence provided by Smalls was considered so significant that the Secretary of the Department of the Navy described it in detail to President Lincoln in the Secretary's annual report.

While this information was Smalls' greatest intelligence contribution to the Union, he subsequently provided another gift to the Navy. On the night of May 12, 1862, he, family members, and other black American crewmen of the Planter, a cargo steamer turned into an armed coastal patrol ship, sailed out of Charleston harbor after the captain and two mates had gone home. In the dark, Smalls pretended to be the captain and, from his previous experiences, was able to provide all the correct countersigns to challenges from the various harbor fortifications. Upon reaching ships forming the Union blockade, he surrendered the Planter to them. Later that month he and his fellow crewmen received payment as a reward from the US government for half the appraised value of the ship as a reward.

When Pinkerton left his position as chief of intelligence for the Army of the Potomac in November 1862, he took all his intelligence files on the Confederacy with him. (Because he had been a private contractor, the files belonged to him). This left Union forces without centralized Confederate order-of-battle information, and the one remaining intelligence officer in the Army of the Potomac had to travel to the War Department in Washington to re-create this information from records of previous battles.

== Charlie Wright ==
When Gen. Joseph Hooker took command of the Army of the Potomac on 27 January 1863, he immediately saw the need for an effective centralized intelligence system. On 11 February, Col. George H. Sharpe, an attorney and an officer of New York state volunteers, accepted the post of head of the Army's intelligence service. Under Sharpe, with direction from Hooker, the Bureau of Military Information (BMI) was created. Its sole focus was collection of intelligence on the enemy; it had no counterintelligence responsibilities. It soon developed into the first "all-source intelligence" organization in US history. Sharpe obtained, collated, analyzed, and provided reports based on scouting, spying behind enemy lines, interrogations, cavalry reconnaissance, balloon observation, Signal Corps observation, flag signal and telegraph intercepts, captured Confederate documents and mail, southern newspapers, and intelligence reporting from subordinate military units. This structured approach, which ended with the Confederate surrender, was not re-institutionalized until 1947, when the CIA was created.

Sharpe's BMI was well established when Charlie Wright, a young black man, arrived at Union lines from Culpeper, Virginia, in June 1863. While being debriefed, his extensive knowledge of units in Lee's army became apparent. He had an excellent memory for details. On 12 June, Capt. John McEntee, an officer from the BMI who had deployed with Union cavalry forces just after the battle of Brandy Station, telegraphed Sharpe the following: "A contraband captured last Tuesday states that he had been living at Culpeper C. H. for some time past. Saw Ewells Corps passing through that place destined for the Valley and Maryland. That Ewells Corps has passed the day previous to the fight and that Longstreet was them coming up." Shortly thereafter, McEntee also reported that Wright was well acquainted with these two corps and that he believed Wright's information was reliable. Wright identified more than a dozen separate Confederate regiments from both Ewell's Corps and Longstreet's Corps. The key intelligence Wright provided was that these troops had passed through Culpeper bound for Maryland.

Thanks to the Bureau's records and all-source information, Sharpe was able to confirm Wright's descriptions of the various Confederate units. This confirmation convinced General Hooker of Wright's assertion that Lee's army was moving into Maryland. Hooker ordered his army to shadow the Confederate forces' movements while traveling on the eastern side of the Blue Ridge Mountains out of view of Lee's troops.

This movement by the Union Army shielded Washington from Lee's forces and eventually forced the battle at Gettysburg. For several decades after the war, Union cavalry reconnaissance was given credit for identifying Lee's movement in the valley toward Maryland. But historical records now make it clear that Wright's intelligence was the key factor in convincing Hooker to move his forces.

While many reasons can be cited for Lee's defeat at Gettysburg, there can be no doubt that the ground held by the Union forces played a significant role in the victory. This was Charlie Wright's contribution. He had provided the intelligence that eventually enabled Union forces to get to Gettysburg first and seize the best ground.

== Agents in place ==
Because both sides were poorly prepared for the war, notwithstanding the many years of political buildup to the actual fighting, there apparently were few intelligence agents who had been specifically placed in the enemy's institutions. In-place agents have the strategic advantage of providing the plans and intentions of an enemy rather than reporting on how and when they are carried out. Although the Confederacy did not create its civilian and military power structure until just before the war began, the Union did have several such agents in the Confederate capital by the first year of the war. Two were black Americans employed by Confederate President Jefferson Davis in his official residence.

William A. Jackson was a slave hired out by the year to President Davis as a coachman. His first documented report was on 3 May 1862, when he crossed into Union lines near Fredericksburg, Virginia. As a servant in the Davis household, he was able to observe and overhear the Confederate President's discussions with his military leadership. While no record remains of the specific intelligence he produced, it apparently was valuable enough to cause General McDowell to telegraph it immediately to the War Department in Washington.

The second agent, Mary Elizabeth Bowser, was part of a Union spy ring known as "the Richmond underground," directed by Elizabeth Van Lew, whose family was well respected and well connected socially in Richmond. While not hiding her Union loyalties, Van Lew affected behavior that made her appear harmless and eccentric to Confederate authorities. After the war, she traveled to Washington and obtained all the official records from the War Department related to her activities and destroyed them. Thus, details on Bowser's specific activities are sparse.

Bowser had been a slave of the Van Lew family, but Van Lew freed her and sent her North to be educated. When Van Lew decided to establish a spy ring in Richmond shortly before the fighting began, she asked Bowser to return and work with her for the Union. Van Lew obtained a position for Bowser as a servant in the Confederate "White House" through the recommendation of a "friend" who provided supplies to that household.

Bowser pretended to be uneducated but hardworking and, after working part-time at several functions, was hired as a regular employee. Her access provided her with opportunities to overhear valuable information. As a black servant, Bowser was almost certainly ignored by the President's guests. Her reporting focused on conversations she overheard between Confederate officials at the President's residence and on documents she was able to read while working around the house. She and Van Lew, often dressed as a country farmwife, would meet at isolated locations on the outskirts of Richmond to exchange information.

Another Union spy, Thomas McNiven, noted that Bowser had a photographic memory and could report every word of the documents she saw at the "White House." In recognition of her intelligence contributions, Bowser was inducted into the US Army Intelligence Hall of Fame at Fort Huachuca, Arizona, on 30 June 1995.

== Tubman's triumphs ==
Harriet Tubman, another black woman involved in intelligence collection for the Union, is well known for her activities with the underground railroad. Her intelligence activities, however, are well documented. Tubman, often referred to by her contemporaries as "Moses," is best known for the numerous trips she made into the south to free relatives and friends and bring them to safety. Her last trip took place in 1860. With the advent of the fighting, she spent the early years of the war assisting with the care and feeding of the many slaves who had fled to Union-controlled areas.

By the spring of 1863, Union officials had found a more dramatic and active role for Tubman. The Union forces in South Carolina badly needed information about the Confederate forces opposing them. Intelligence on the strength of enemy units, location of encampments, and designs of fortifications was almost nil. All these requirements could be met by short-term spying trips behind enemy lines, and it fell to Tubman to organize and lead these expeditions.

Tubman selected a few former slaves knowledgeable about the areas to be visited and established her spy organization. Often disguised as a field hand or poor farm wife, she led several spy missions herself, while directing others from Union lines. She reported her intelligence to Col. James Montgomery, a Union officer commanding the Second South Carolina Volunteers, a black unit involved in guerrilla warfare activities.

The tactical intelligence Tubman provided to Union forces during the war was frequent, abundant, and used effectively in military operations. For example, her part in a June 1863 Union raid up the Combahee River in South Carolina is well documented. Tubman had conducted spy missions into the area, identified enemy supply areas, and reported weaknesses in Confederate troop deployments.

In late May, Gen. David Hunter, commander of all Union forces in the area, asked Tubman to personally guide a raiding party up the river. On the evening of 2 June, Tubman led Montgomery and 150 of his men up the river past Confederate picket lines. In a swift raid, taking the Confederates by surprise, the Union forces destroyed several million dollars' worth of Confederate supplies and brought back more than 800 slaves and thousands of dollars in enemy property. By this action alone, Tubman's contribution to the Union cause was significant. When Tubman died in 1913, she was honored with a full military funeral as a mark of respect for her activities during the war.

== A signal achievement ==
No discussion of intelligence activities by black Americans during the Civil War would be complete without mention of a popular story about a black couple who provided intelligence on Confederate troop movements to the Union during the fighting around Fredericksburg, Virginia in 1863. The original account evidently appeared in a newspaper or magazine article written by a Union officer who claimed to have been a witness to the events. No official records have documented this story, and the claims about the value of the intelligence produced are questionable. But there is probably some factual basis for the tale.

The story involved a runaway slave named Dabney, who crossed into Union lines with his wife and found employment in General Hooker's headquarters camp. It became apparent that Dabney knew the geography of the area very well, and, though he had little education, was clever. He quickly developed an interest in the Union flag-signal system, and he learned all he could about it.

After several weeks, Dabney's wife asked permission to return to Confederate lines as a personal servant to a Southern woman returning to her home. A few days after his wife's departure, Dabney began reporting Confederate movements to members of Hooker's staff. His reports soon proved accurate, and he was questioned as to the source of his intelligence.

Dabney explained that he and his wife had worked out a signaling system based on the laundry that she hung out to dry at her mistress's house, which was observable from Hooker's headquarters. As the wife observed Confederate troop movements, she would hang the laundry in a particular sequence to signal Dabney of the activity. For example, a white shirt represented Gen. A. P. Hill, a pair of pants hung upside down represented the direction west, and so forth. This system produced useful intelligence on Confederate movements until Hooker moved his headquarters.

While such a signaling system could produce simple messages such as "Hill-north-three regiments," the value of the information would not be great. Union cavalry pickets and Signal Corps observers would have provided similar intelligence. But the fact that this story is repeated in numerous articles and books makes it a part of the legend of intelligence activities during the war.
