= 120th New York Infantry Regiment =

- New York flag
- Active: August 22, 1862, to June 3, 1865
- Country: United States
- Allegiance: Union
- Branch: Infantry
- Nickname(s): Ulster Regiment, Washington Guards
- Engagements: American Civil War: Battle of Fredericksburg; Battle of Chancellorsville; Battle of Gettysburg; Bristoe Campaign; Mine Run Campaign; Battle of the Wilderness; Battle of Spotsylvania Court House; Battle of Cold Harbor; Siege of Petersburg; Second Battle of Petersburg; Battle of Jerusalem Plank Road; Second Battle of Deep Bottom; Battle of Boydton Plank Road; Battle of Fort Stedman; Appomattox Campaign; Battle of White Oak Road; Battle of Sailor's Creek; Battle of High Bridge; Battle of Appomattox Court House

Commanders
- Colonel: George Henry Sharpe
- Lieutenant Colonel: Cornelius D. Westbrook
- Lieutenant Colonel: John R. Tappen
- Lieutenant Colonel: Abram L. Lockwood

Insignia
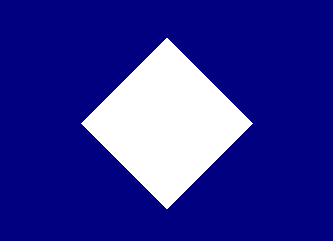
- 2nd Division, III Corps

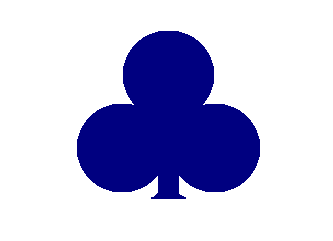
- 3rd Division, II Corps

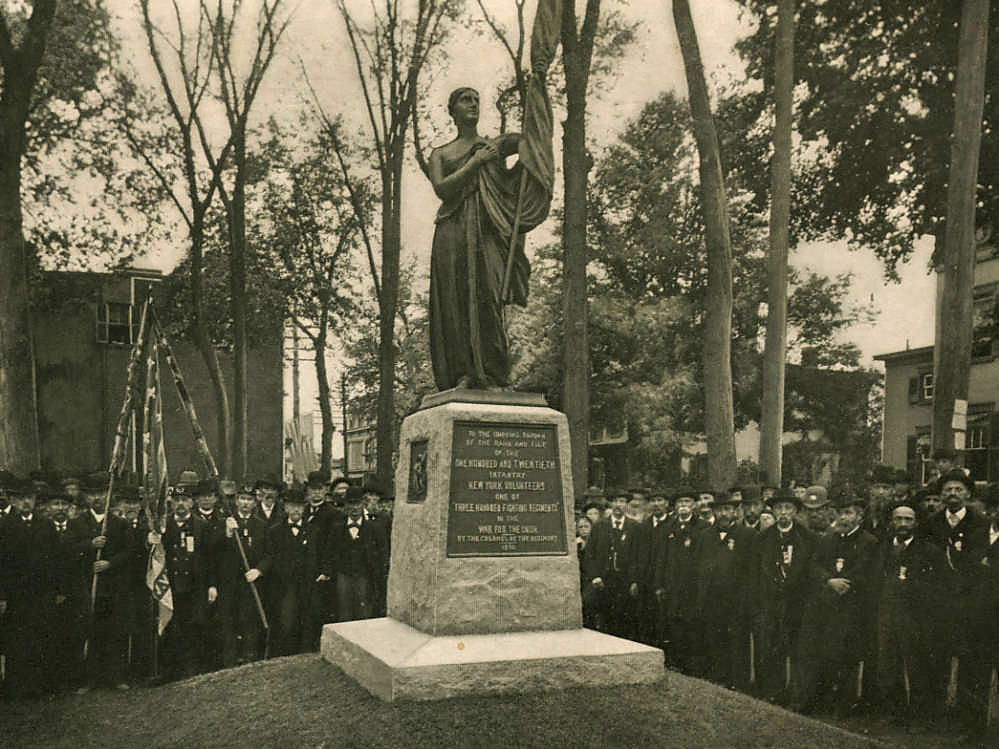
Dedication of monument in Kingston, NY, October 17, 1896; photo: Friends of Historic Kingston

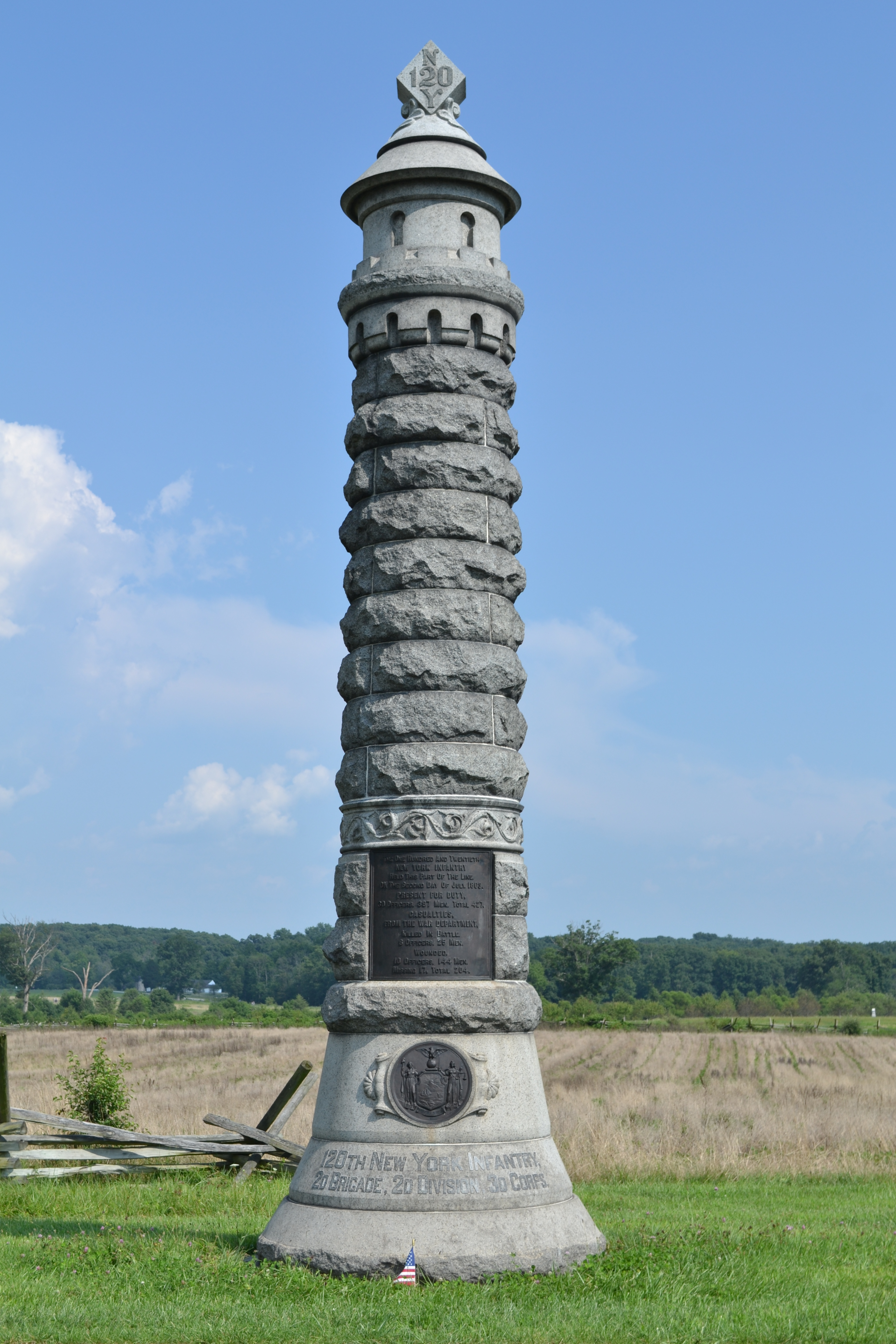
The monument to the 120th New York Volunteer Infantry Regiment at Gettysburg

The 120th New York Infantry Regiment was an infantry regiment in the Union Army during the American Civil War.

== Service ==
The 120th New York Infantry was organized at Kingston, New York, and mustered in for three years service on August 22, 1862, under the command of Colonel George Henry Sharpe.

The 120th New York Infantry mustered out of service June 3, 1865. Veterans and recruits whose enlistments had not expired were transferred to the 73rd New York Infantry.

== Affiliations, battle honors, detailed service, and casualties ==
=== Organizational affiliation ===
The regiment was attached to the following brigades:

- Whipple's Brigade, Defenses of Washington, D.C., to October 1862
- 1st Brigade, 2nd Division, III Corps, Army of the Potomac, to December 1862
- 2nd Brigade, 2nd Division, III Corps, to March 1864
- 2nd Brigade, 4th Division, II Corps, Army of the Potomac, to May 1864
- 4th Brigade, 3rd Division, II Corps, to July 1864
- 3rd Brigade, 3rd Division, II Corps, to June 1865.

=== List of battles ===
The official list of battles in which the regiment bore a part:

- Battle of Fredericksburg
- Battle of Chancellorsville
- Battle of Gettysburg
- Bristoe Campaign
- Mine Run Campaign
- Battle of the Wilderness
- Battle of Spotsylvania Court House
- Battle of Cold Harbor
- Siege of Petersburg
- Second Battle of Petersburg
- Battle of Jerusalem Plank Road
- Second Battle of Deep Bottom
- Battle of Boydton Plank Road
- Battle of Fort Stedman
- Appomattox Campaign
- Battle of White Oak Road
- Battle of Sailor's Creek
- Battle of High Bridge
- Battle of Appomattox Court House

=== Detailed service ===
==== 1862 ====
- Left New York for Washington, D.C., August 24, 1862.
- Duty in the defenses of Washington, D. C., until November 1862.
- At Fairfax Station, Virginia, until November 25.
- Operations on the Orange & Alexandria Railroad November 10–12.
- Rappahannock Campaign December 1862 to June 1863.
- Battle of Fredericksburg, December 12–15, 1862.
- At Falmouth, Virginia, until April 1863.

==== 1863 ====
- "Mud March" January 20–24.
- Operations at Rappahannock Bridge and Grove Church February 5–7.
- Chancellorsville Campaign April 27 – May 6.
- Battle of Chancellorsville May 1–5.
- Gettysburg Campaign June 11 – July 24.
- Battle of Gettysburg July 1–3.
- Pursuit of the army led by Robert E. Lee to Manassas Gap, Virginia, July 5–24.
- Wapping Heights July 23.
- Duty on line of the Rappahannock and Rapidan until October.
- Advance from the Rappahannock to the Rapidan September 13–17.
- Bristoe Campaign October 8–22.
- James City October 8, 9 and 10.
- Russell's Ford, Robertson's River, and Bethesda Church October 10.
- Advance to line of the Rappahannock November 7–8.
- Kelly's Ford November 7.
- Mine Run Campaign November 26 – December 2.
- Payne's Farm November 27.
- Mine Run November 28–30.
- Duty near Brandy Station until May 1864.

==== 1864 ====
- Demonstration on the Rapidan February 6–7.
- Campaign from the Rapidan to the James May 3 – June 15.
- Battle of the Wilderness May 5–7,
- Laurel Hill May 8,
- Spotsylvania May 8–12,
- Spotsylvania Court House May 12–21.
- Assault on the Salient or "Bloody Angle" May 12.
- Harris Farm or Fredericksburg Road May 19.
- North Anna River May 23–26.
- On line of the Pamunkey May 26–28.
- Totopotomoy May 28–31.
- Cold Harbor June 1–12.
- Before Petersburg June 16–18.
- Siege of Petersburg June 16, 1864, to April 2, 1865.
- Jerusalem Plank Road, Weldon Railroad, June 22–23, 1864.
- Demonstration north of the James River, July 27–29.
- Deep Bottom, July 27–28.
- Mine Explosion, Petersburg, July 30 (reserve).
- Demonstration north of the James River, August 13–20.
- Strawberry Plains, Deep Bottom, August 14–18.
- Poplar Springs Church, September 29 – October 2.
- Boydton Plank Road, Hatcher's Run, October 27–28.
- Front of Forts Hascall and Morton November 5.
- Reconnaissance to Hatcher's Run December 9–10.

==== 1865 ====
- Dabney's Mills, Hatcher's Run, February 5–7, 1865.
- Watkins' House March 25.
- Appomattox Campaign March 28 – April 9.
- Boydton and White Oak Roads March 29–31.
- Fall of Petersburg April 2.
- Pursuit of Lee April 3–9.
- Sailor's Creek April 6.
- High Bridge, Farmville, April 7.
- Appomattox Court House April 9. Surrender of Lee and his army.
- At Burkesville until May 2.
- Moved to Washington, D.C., May 2–12.
- Grand Review of the Armies May 23.

== Casualties ==
The regiment lost a total of 384 men during service: 11 officers and 140 enlisted men killed or mortally wounded, 3 officers and 179 enlisted men died of disease, and 51 died in Confederate prisons.

== Commanders ==
- Colonel George Henry Sharpe - commanded until assigned to Army of the Potomac Provost Office and Bureau of Military Information on February 9, 1863
- Lieutenant Colonel Cornelius D. Westbrook - took command on February 9, 1863 when Col. Sharpe was reassigned; Westbrook was wounded in action at the Battle of Gettysburg on July 2, 1863
- Major John R. Tappen - took command on July 2, 1863 when Lt. Col. Westbrook was wounded; Tappen was promoted to Lt. Col. on February 27, 1864 and mustered out on December 3, 1864
- Major Abram L. Lockwood - took command on December 3, 1864 when Lt. Col. Tappen mustered out; Lockwood was promoted to Lt. Col. on December 20, 1864

== See also ==
- List of New York Civil War regiments
- New York in the Civil War
