= William A. Jackson (spy) =

William A. Jackson was a spy/freed slave for the Union forces during the American Civil War. A household slave and coachman of Jefferson Davis, President of the Confederate States of America, he observed communications between Davis and other Confederate officials. When he escaped and fled to the north in 1861, he gave the Union detailed information about Confederate military deployments, supply problems, and planning. The information was recognized at the time as valuable to the Union war efforts. Little known for many years, Jackson's life was recognized more recently as part of the larger issue of Black Dispatches, studied among others by the United States Central Intelligence Agency's Center for the Study of Intelligence.
