= Bureau of Military Information =

Intelligence agency of the Union Army during the American Civil War

The Bureau of Military Information (BMI) was the first formal and organized American intelligence agency, active during the American Civil War.

== Predecessors ==
Allan Pinkerton was contracted by Federal and a number of state and local governments to solve cases such as train robberies. In early 1861, Pinkerton assumed responsibility for Abraham Lincoln's safety, including gaining wind of an alleged assassination attempt.

Shortly after the start of the Civil War, Pinkerton was contacted by George B. McClellan, a friend and former client, to provide intelligence for the Department of the Ohio.

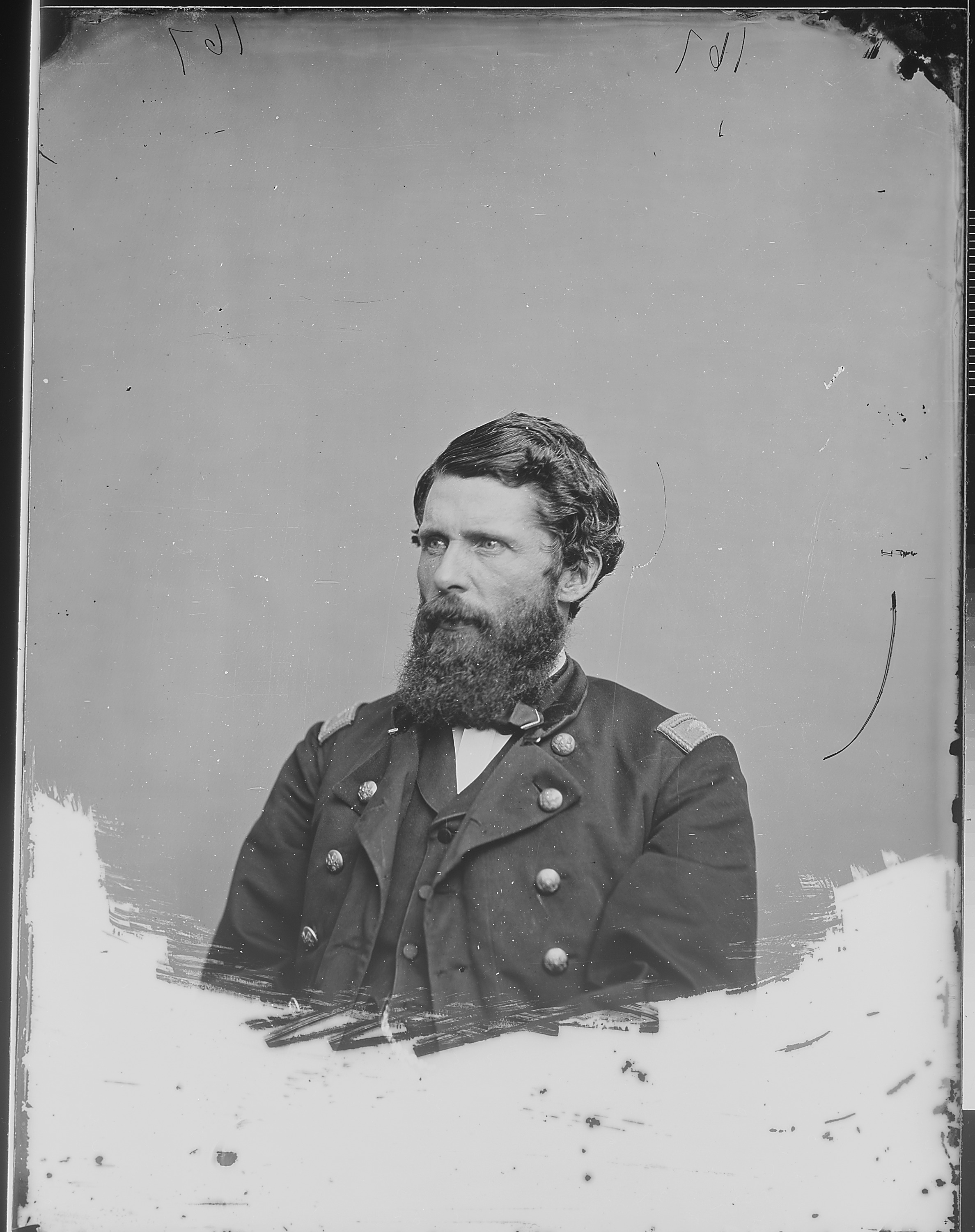
Lafayette C Baker

Colonel Charles Pomeroy Stone also utilized a number of detectives. Starting in 1862, General Winfield Scott hired Lafayette C. Baker to provide him services similar to those Pinkerton provided McClellan. Lincoln hired William A. Lloyd to infiltrate the Confederacy and report directly to him at the cost of $200 a month plus expenses.

In all cases, the detectives and spies in question were civilians, despite the fact they reported to military heads and served in wartime (Pinkerton, however, created an alias that was a Union Army major). They also reported directly to and were paid at the leisure of their superiors, not to any military or government agency, and in fact, Pinkerton and Baker's organizations actively competed against one another, to the point of arresting each other's agents to maintain an upper hand. After the war, both Pinkerton and Baker claimed to have held the position of "Chief of the United States Secret Service". However, none of the above are considered to be a true intelligence agency.

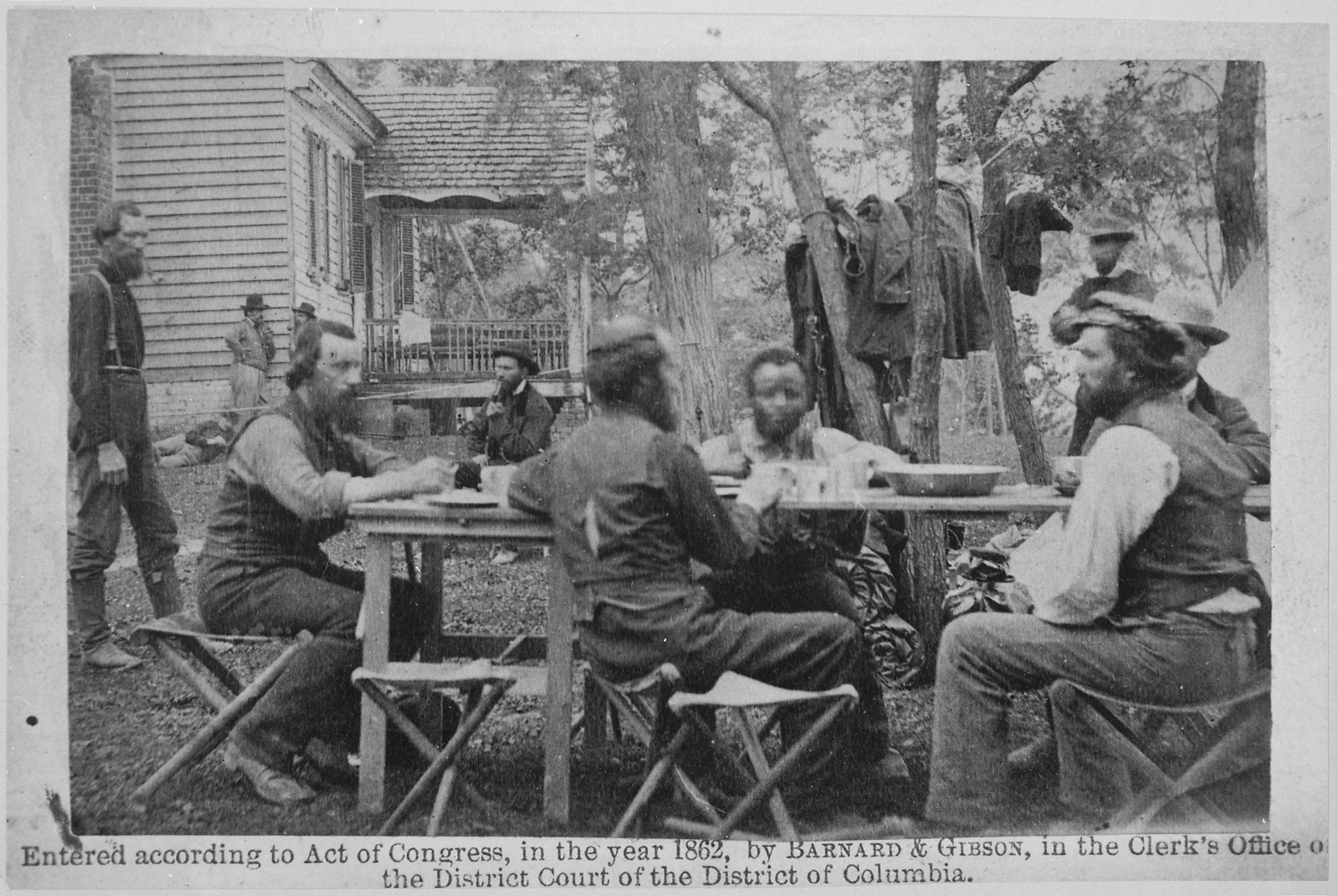
Allan Pinkerton, chief of McClellan's secret service, with his men near Cumberland Landing, Virginia, 05-14-1862

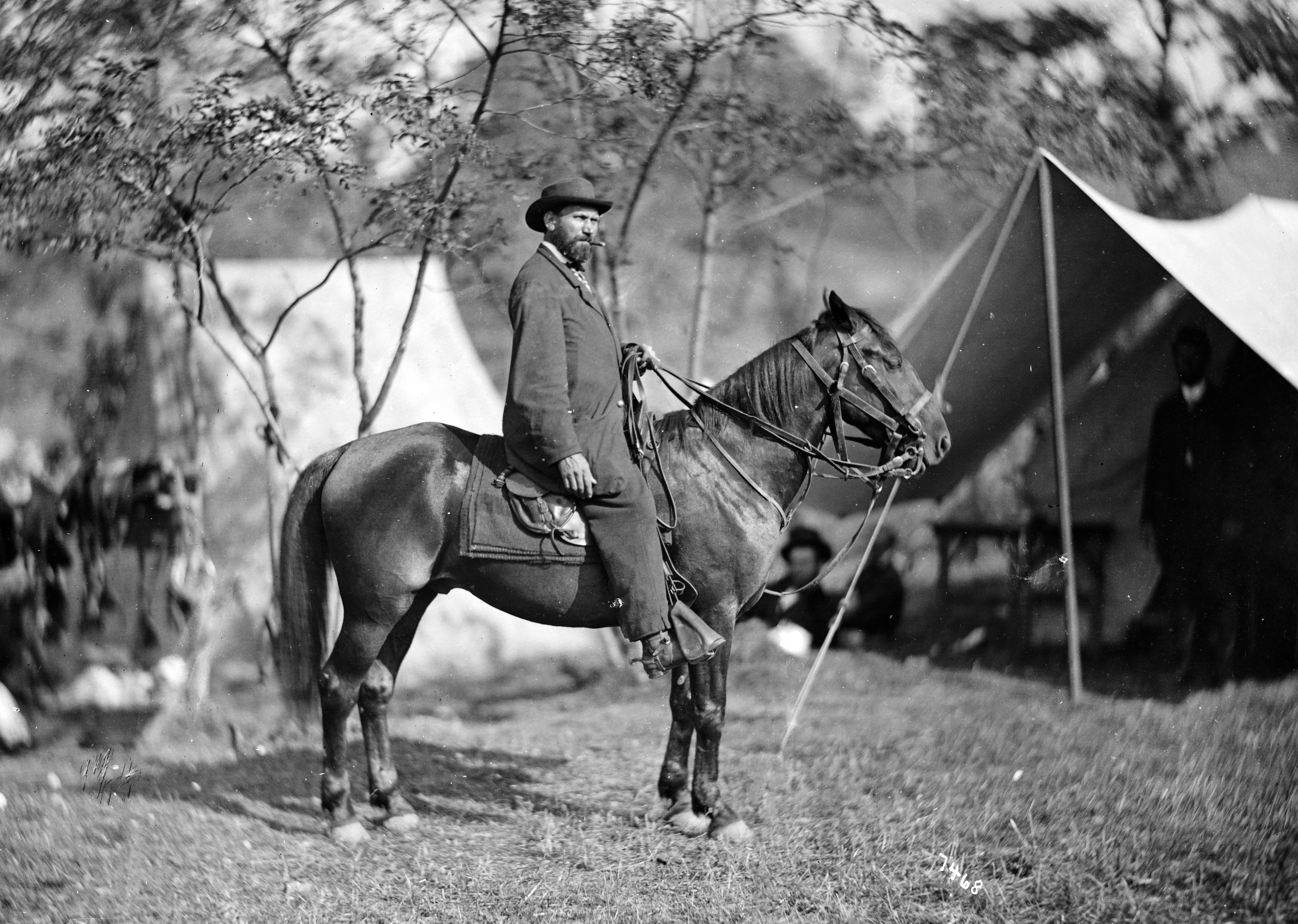
Pinkerton on horseback on the Antietam Battlefield in 1862

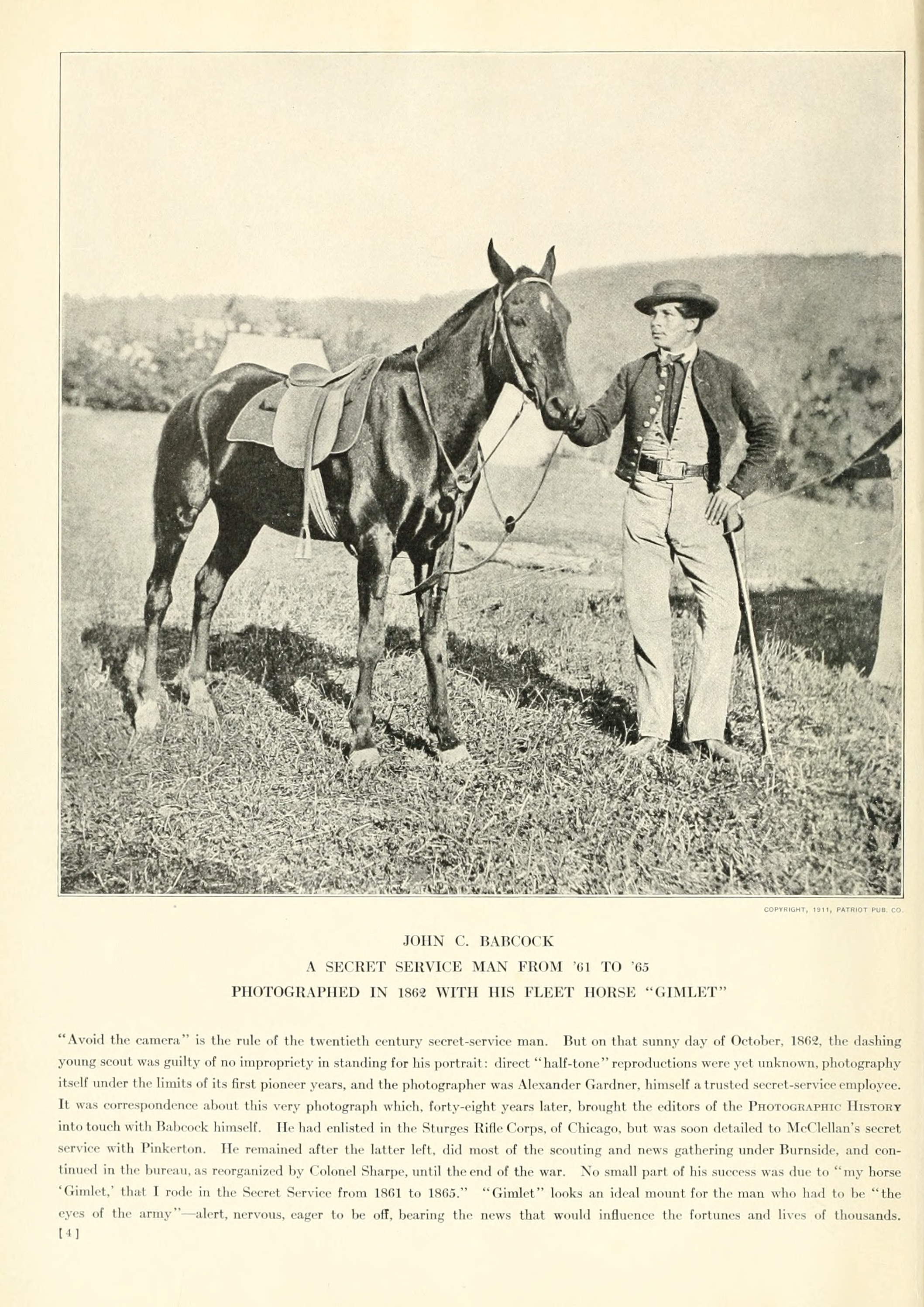
John G Babcock with his horse "Gimlet"

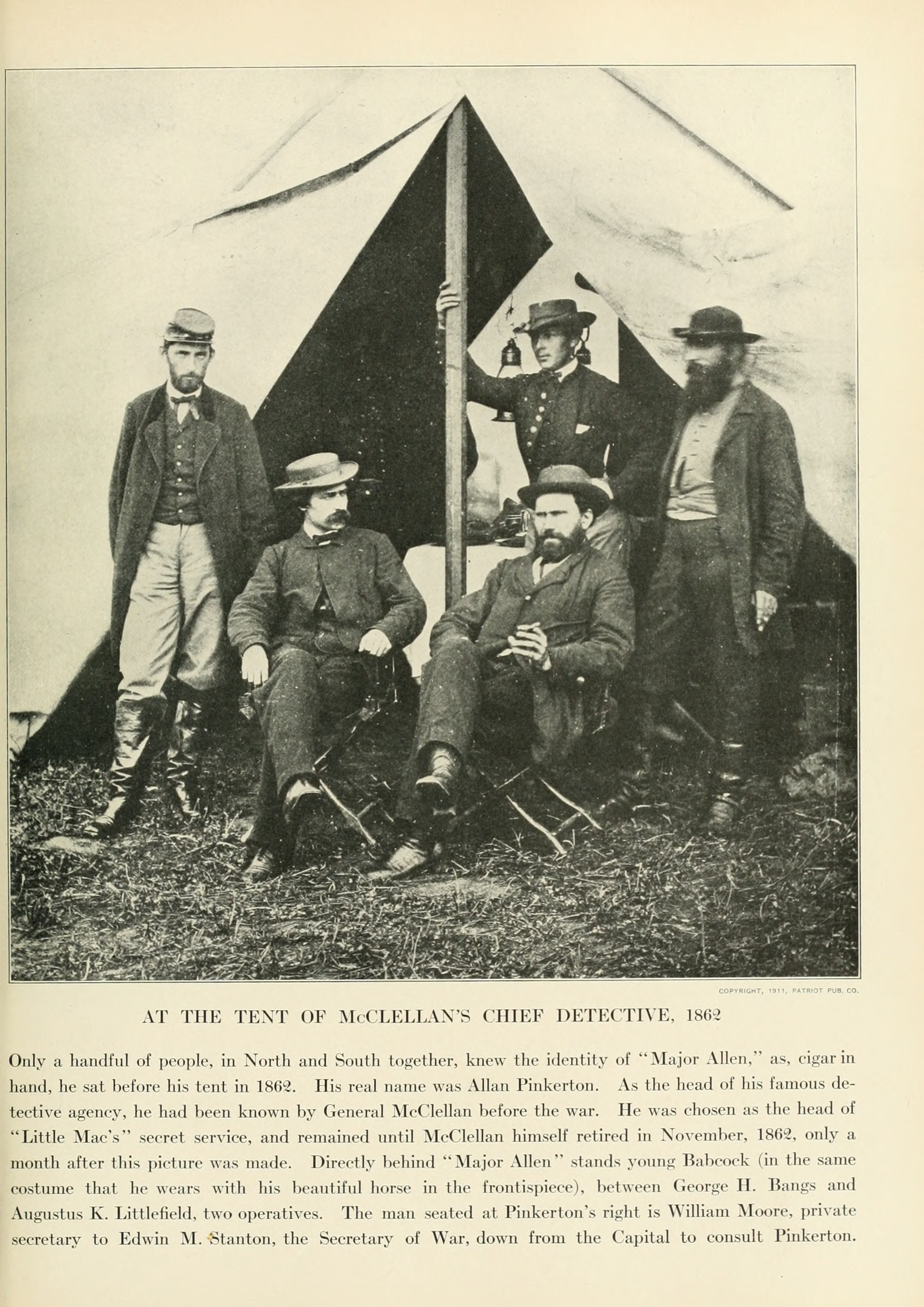
Right foreground Allan Pinkerton aka "Major E.J. Allen" with his operatives: Left to right: George H. Bangs; John G. Babcock; Augustus K. Littlefield. Seated in the left foreground William H. Moore, private Secretary to Edwin M Stanton

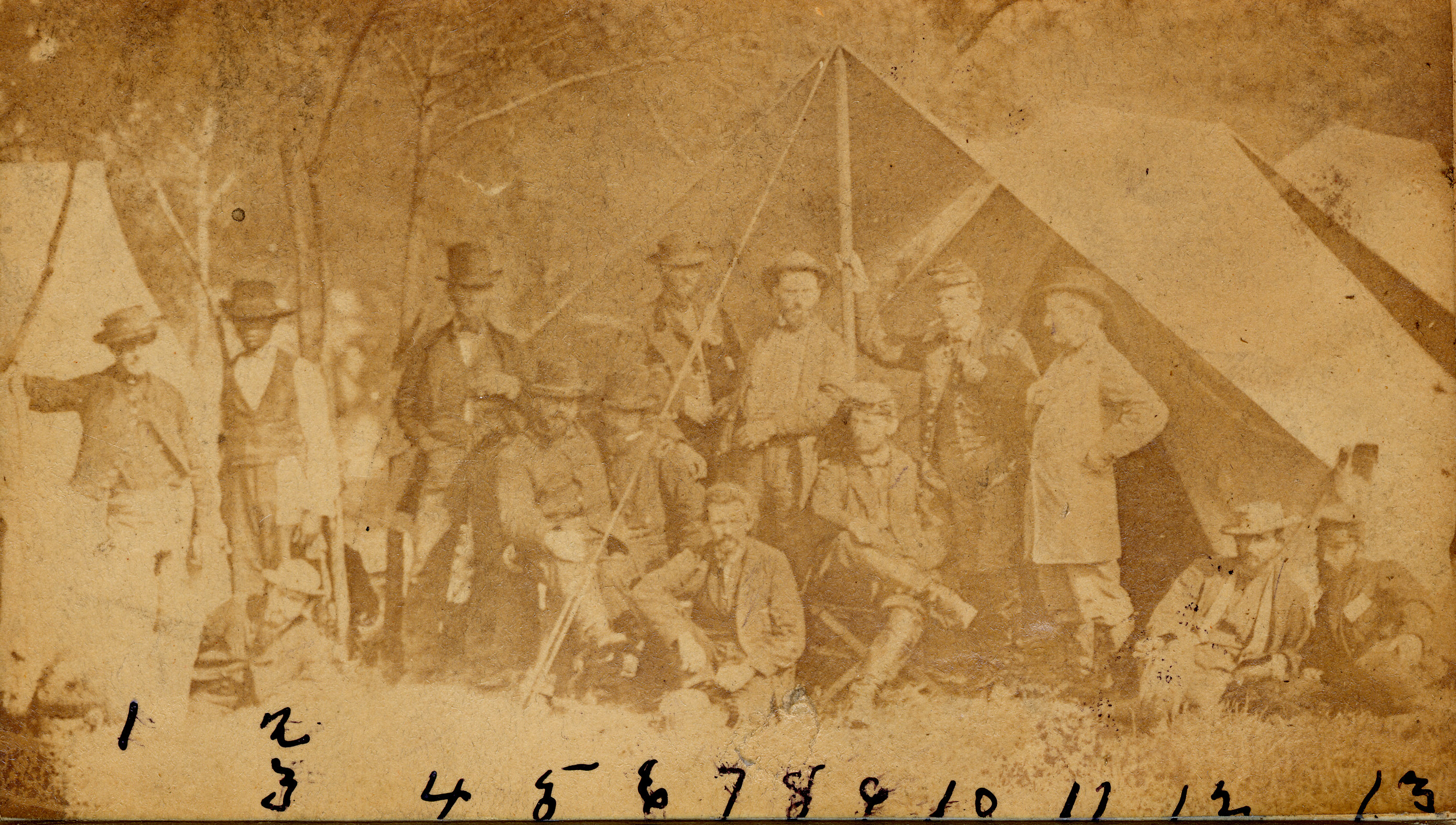
October 1862 Pinkerton with about a dozen of his "opertatives"

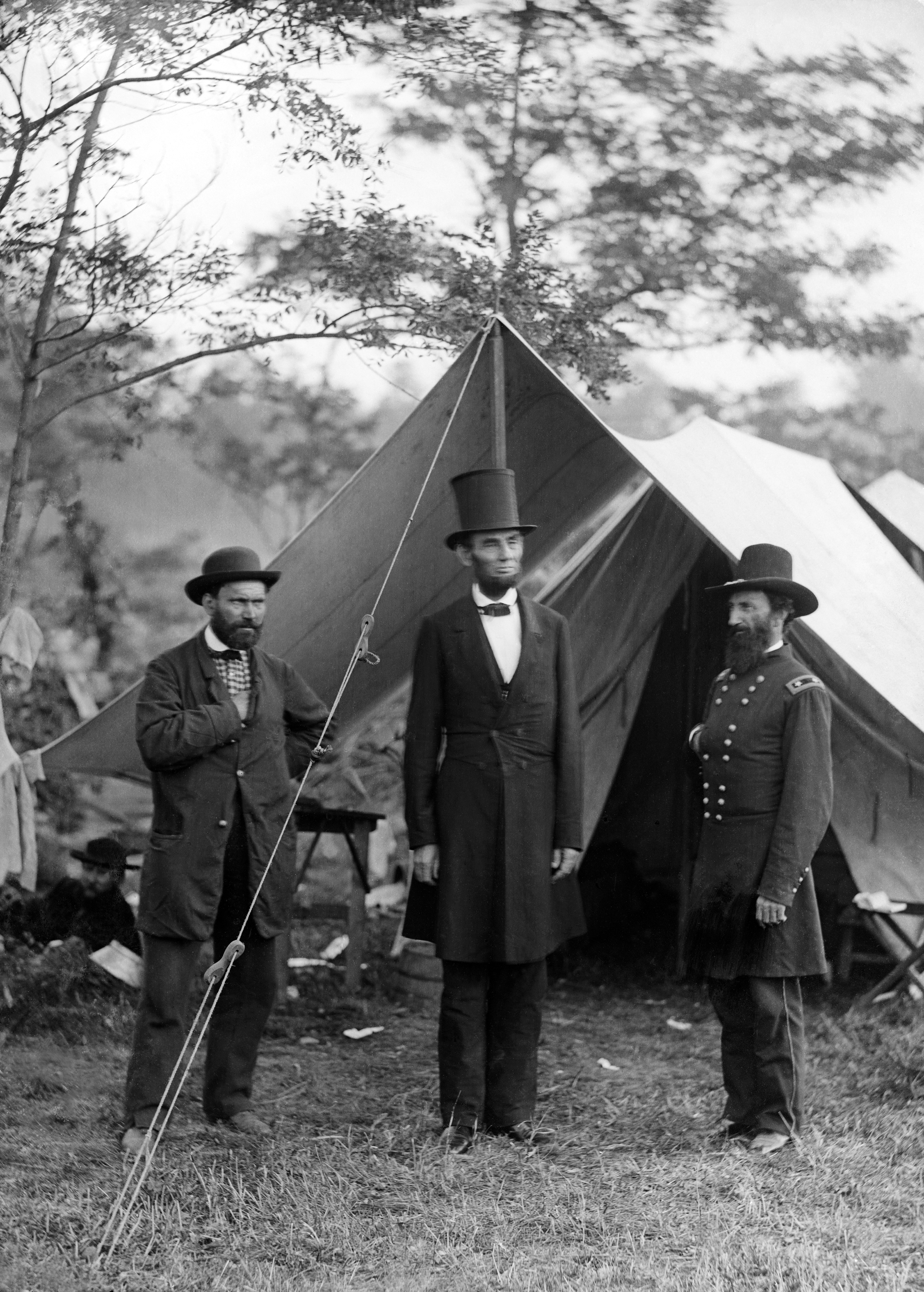
Pinkerton (left) with Abraham Lincoln and Major General John A. McClernand

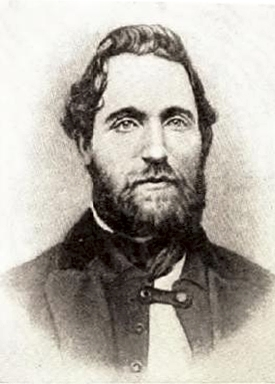
Timothy Webster a Pinkerton operative who was hanged in Richmond Va in 1862

== Bureau of Military Information ==
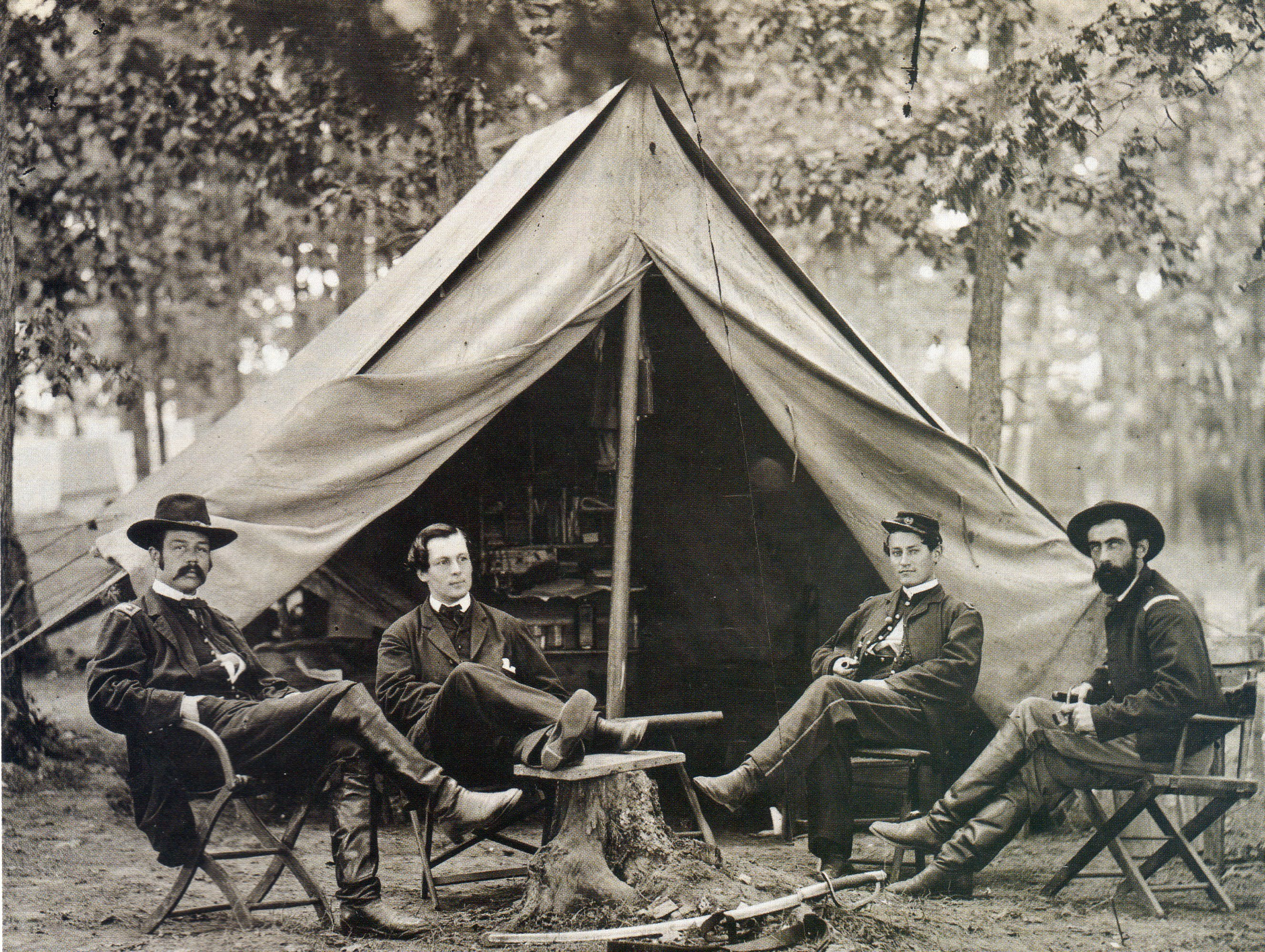
Col. George Henry Sharpe sits at far left with other members of his BMI, John G. Babcock, unidentified officer, and Lt. Col. John McEntee; February, 1864. A similar picture of the same group can be seen here.

On January 26, 1863, Major General Joseph Hooker was given command of the Army of the Potomac. One of his first orders was for his deputy provost marshal, Colonel George H. Sharpe, to establish an intelligence unit. Sharpe, a New Yorker and an attorney before the war was assisted by John C. Babcock, a Pinkerton civilian and former employee. On February 11, 1863, they established the Bureau of Military Information.

The BMI utilized around 70 field agents during the war, ten of whom were killed. In addition to field agents, information was gathered through interrogation of prisoners of war and refugees, newspapers, and documents left on the battlefield by Confederate officers who had retreated or been killed.

In July 1864, Commanding General Ulysses S. Grant, in preparation for the campaign to capture Richmond, stationed Sharpe and the BMI staff into his command headquarters, to ensure he would have the most up to date knowledge of the battlefield. Sharpe and BMI continued to serve Grant up until the Battle of Appomattox Court House, where they were responsible for paroling the former members of the Army of Northern Virginia, including Robert E. Lee himself.

== Aftermath ==
The BMI was disbanded in 1865 at the end of the Civil War. The United States would not create another formal intelligence agency until the Office of Naval Intelligence was established in 1882. The Army would create its Military Information Division in 1885, which would become the predecessor of the Military Intelligence Corps and United States Army Intelligence and Security Command.

Following Lincoln's assassination, Baker would be responsible for tracking down the conspirators, but would eventually be dismissed by Andrew Johnson due to allegedly spying on the President himself for Edwin M. Stanton. Baker would also hunt for Lincoln's conspirators, this time in Europe as a special agent of the United States Department of State. After being elected President of the United States, Grant appointed Sharpe as United States Marshal for the Southern District of New York where he helped root out corruption, including disbanding the Tweed Ring.

== See also ==
- American Civil War spies
- Black Dispatches
- Confederate Secret Service
