= Mary Louvestre =

Federal spy during the American Civil War

Mary Louveste (sometimes mis-transcribed as Mary Louvestre) was an African-American Union spy in Norfolk, Virginia, during the American Civil War. She delivered details of plans for the conversion of the wrecked USS Merrimack to an ironclad that would be named the CSS Virginia and which represented a great advance in Confederate naval capabilities.

== Personal life ==
Mary Louveste (nee Ogilvie) was born about 1812 in Norfolk City (nee Norfolk Borough) to Lewis and Sukey Ogilvie. Lewis was a free mulatto from French San Domingo, and Sukey was a free African American woman from York County, Virginia. It is unknown if Sukey was black or biracial.

Mary grew up in Norfolk Borough and was most likely raised in the Catholic faith. On 24 September 1834, Mary went before Norfolk City’s Hustings and Corporation Court to register as a free mulatto adult for the first time. Her mother, Sukey, first registered Mary with the City on 29 October 1828 as a free mulatto and claimed her as her daughter.

In 1838, Mary started securing an annual business license with the City to either run a private entertainment establishment (like a restaurant or bar) or a boarding house. In April 1839, she purchased a 10-year-old enslaved mulatto boy, Mark Rene DeMortie (De Mortie), from the estate of Dr. Robert B. Stark. Mark has roots in San Domingo like Mary and is a member of the DeMortier family who settled in Norfolk from San Domingo. The reasons for Mary's purchase are unknown; however, she freed him on 25 March 1850, a few weeks before his 21st birthday.

Mary met and later married Michael Louveste on 1 June 1844 at Saint Patrick’s Catholic Church in Norfolk, VA. It appears that the marriage was not recognized by civil authorities, because Mary was referred to by her maiden name in the records until 1860.

Michael Louveste was a French free mulatto from the Caribbean island of Guadeloupe. He arrived in Norfolk about 1837. They had at least three children: two daughters, Susan and Ophelia, and one son, Robert. Both Robert and Ophelia died on 1 September 1855 during the yellow fever epidemic. Susan survived to adulthood and married Robert Francis, a mulatto and a butcher, on 7 October 1869 at her parents' house on Nivison Street in Norfolk, Virginia. They had one son, Robert. On 4 April 1873, Susan died during the birth of their second child, and the infant did not survive. Robert Francis senior died a few years later, and Robert junior went to live with the Louvestes.

After Michael and Mary married in 1844, Mary continued to secure the business licenses (typically ordinary licenses) until 1847, when Michael began securing the licenses. Mary likely continued to operate the boarding houses when her husband started working at Gosport Shipyard in the early 1850s. On 22 February 1854, Michael and Mary were able to secure a lease from Jonathan Dodd to use the building at Nivison Street (later listed as 8 Nivison Street). They used the building as their boarding house.

Michael Louveste was working at the shipyard at the outbreak of the Civil War, and Confederate forces seized the yard. In later documentation, Michael was a tool keeper in the steam engineering department at the yard. William H. Lyons, a known Union sympathizer and spy, also worked in the steam engineering department during the conversion of the screw frigate USS Merrimack into the steam ironclad CSS Virginia. Likely, Lyons and the Louvestes worked together to send updates and plans to the Union. In February 1862, Mary was smuggled across to the Union lines and personally met Union Secretary of the Navy Gideon Welles, where she gave him the blueprints of the CSS Virginia and other intelligence about the ship.

After making it home, Mary and Michael continued to live in Norfolk during and after the war. In the late 1860s, the Louvestes were able to secure ownership of the property on Nivison Street. They continued to operate either a bar, restaurant, or boarding house through the 1870s.

In 1868, Mary wrote a letter to A.H. Kilty, Commodore at Norfolk Naval Shipyard, where she explained how she did everything for "'Our Navy' and rescue its 'heroic defenders'".

Michael died on 4 January 1880 from tuberculosis. Mary died on 31 October 1883 at her home. It is unknown where they are buried; however, it is probable they were laid to rest at one of the city’s Catholic cemeteries.

== Legends ==
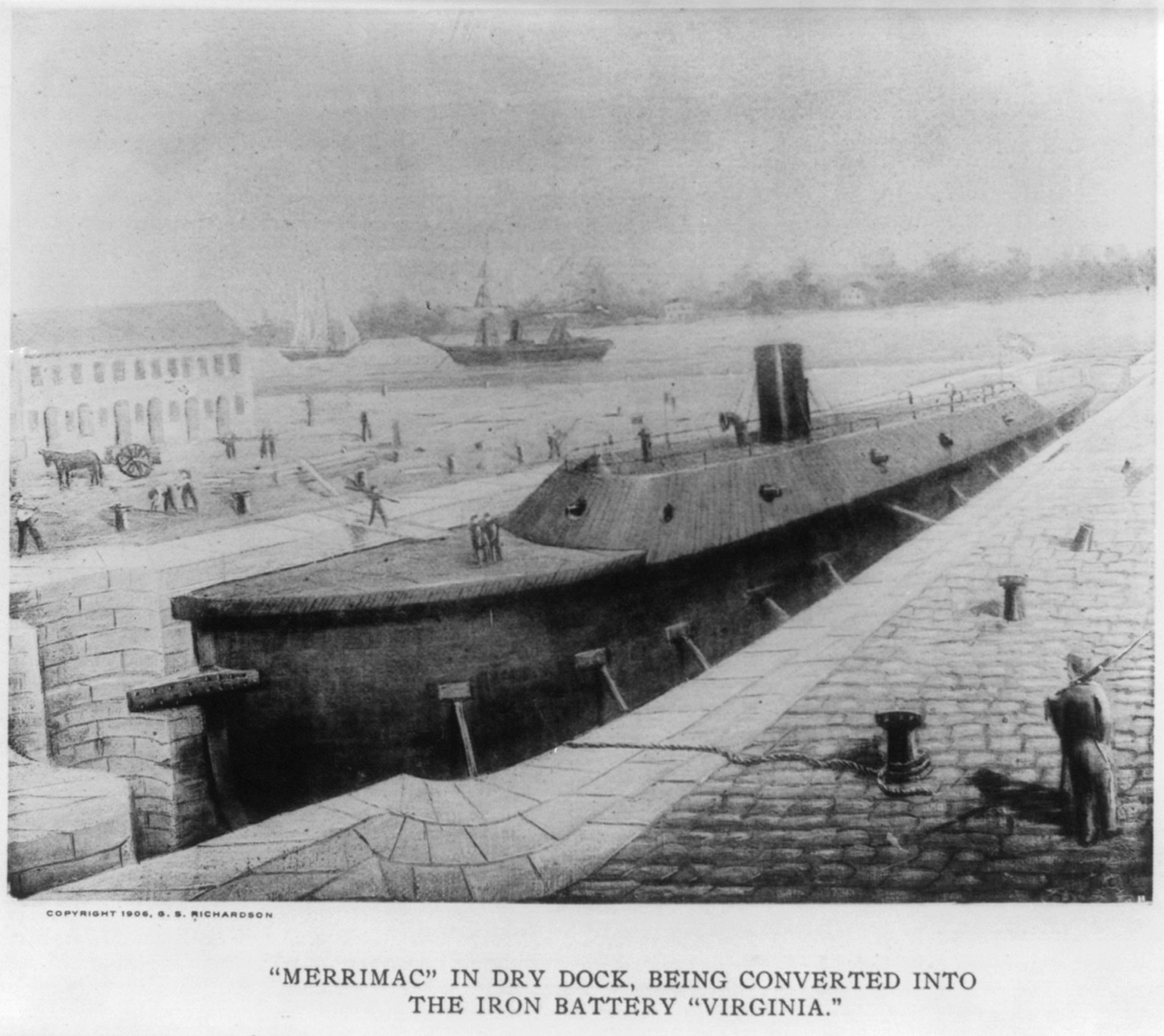
USS Merrimack in dry dock, being converted into the CSS Virginia

There are multiple accounts of her story. The earliest and most reliable initial account comes from documentation by then Secretary of the Navy, Gideon Welles. This account states that Louveste worked with several Black and white Unionists, including William H. Lyons, who was one of the few workers at Norfolk's Gosport Shipyard who did not flee when Norfolk was captured by the Confederate Army early in the war, but who was still providing information about the Confederacy through contacts at Fort Monroe. Welles states that Louveste came to him in great secrecy in February 1862 with documents about the CSS Virginia from Lyons. Biographical details about Louveste's early life in eastern Virginia, which can be found in primary documents created before the Civil War, align with Welles's account.

Another account, likely fictionalized and less reliable, exists based on the work by novelist G. Allen Foster published in Ebony magazine in 1964, aspects of which have been repeated in many other sources, including a 1998 publication by the US Army Corps of Engineers. This account contains unsubstantiated biographical details and spells her surname as "Louvestre." In this fictionalized account, Mary Louvestre was born in the Shenandoah Valley and was bought in her early teens by a small farmer. At the time of the Civil War, she may have been between 55 and 70 years old. She had a talent for drafting, and to capitalize on her skills was taught to sew and trained as a seamstress. When the farm faced two tough years in a row, they were forced to sell Mary, who was bought by her owner's cousin, Simeon or John Louvestre, in Norfolk.

According to the fictionalized account, in July 1861, she overheard her employer (she bought her freedom with her money from seamstress skills), who worked as engineer or ship-chandler in Norfolk's Gosport Shipyard bragging about the ironclad Merrimack (later renamed the CSS Virginia) they were building which would dominate the Union Navy. Early in the mornings for the next week, Mary snuck into the engineers’ office and used her seamstress skills to trace the drawings of the ironclad.

The fictionalized account claims that in order to get her information to Union leaders, she obtained permission to visit her previous owners in the valley. Pass in hand, she headed for Union lines near Fredericksburg and, with the assistance of the Underground Railroad, reached her destination. She was then escorted to Washington, D.C., under military guard, where she met with Secretary of the Navy Gideon Welles. Welles offered Mary freedom and employment, but Mary preferred to return and await freedom in Norfolk. The Union used the information to hasten the completion of the ironclad USS Monitor, which would later battle the Merrimac and protect Union blockaders from the Merrimac's offensive power.

Yet another fictionalized account of her story, again using an incorrect spelling of her name and fabricated biographical details, The Treason of Mary Louvestre by My Haley, was published in 2013 and is closer to the Foster version of the story.
