= George H. Sharpe =

American politician (1828–1900)

George Henry Sharpe
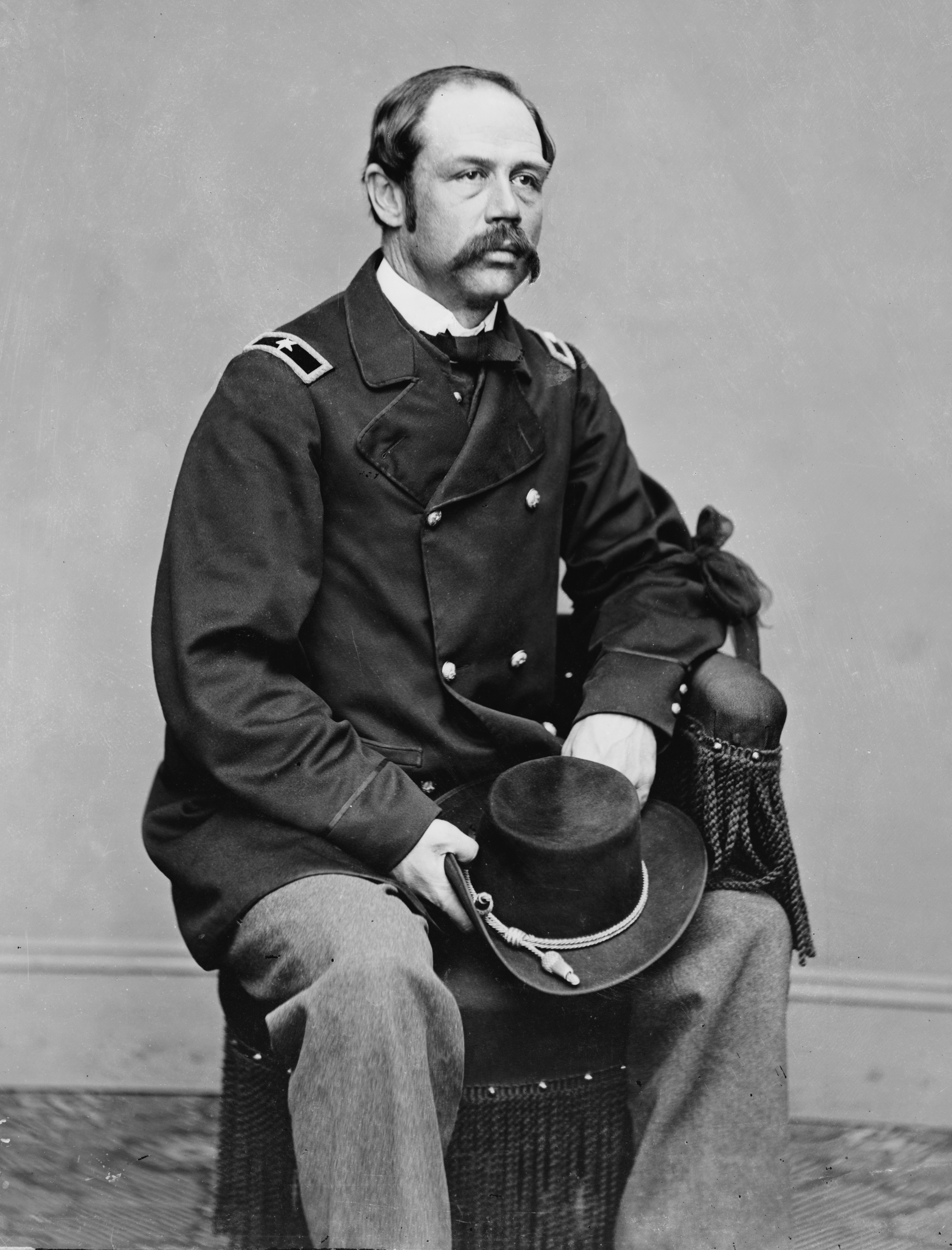

Member of the Board of General Appraisers
- In office November 16, 1890 – March 1, 1899
- Appointed by: Benjamin Harrison
- Preceded by: Seat established by Congress
- Succeeded by: William Barberie Howell

Speaker of the New York State Assembly
- In office January 6, 1880 – December 31, 1881
- Preceded by: Thomas G. Alvord
- Succeeded by: Charles E. Patterson

Member of the New York State Assembly for Ulster Co., 1st District
- In office January 1, 1878 – December 31, 1882
- Preceded by: Thomas Hamilton
- Succeeded by: Thomas H. Tremper

Personal details
- Born: February 26, 1828 Kingston, New York, US
- Died: January 13, 1900 (aged 71) New York City, US
- Resting place: Wiltwyck Cemetery; Kingston, New York, US
- Party: Republican
- Spouse: Caroline Hone Hasbrouck
- Children: 3

Military service
- Allegiance: United States: Union
- Branch/service: Union Army
- Years of service: 1861–1865
- Rank: Colonel; Brevet Major General
- Commands: 120th New York Infantry; Bureau of Military Information
- Battles/wars: American Civil War: Battle of Fredericksburg; Battle of Chancellorsville; Battle of Gettysburg; Bristoe Campaign; Mine Run Campaign; Overland Campaign; Richmond-Petersburg Campaign; Appomattox Campaign

George Henry Sharpe (February 26, 1828 – January 13, 1900) was an American lawyer, soldier, Secret Service officer, diplomat, politician, and Member of the Board of General Appraisers.

Sharpe was born in 1828, in Kingston, New York, into a prominent Ulster County family. He earned his bachelor's degree at Rutgers University and studied law at Yale University. He practiced law in New York City from 1847 to 1851. He served as Secretary of the United States Legation in Vienna, Austrian Empire from 1851 to 1852 and then resumed his law practice in New York from 1854 to 1861.

At the outbreak of the Civil War, Sharpe served as a captain in a New York regiment for three months and then returned to civilian life. In 1862, at the request of the Governor of New York, he raised a new regiment and went back into service as a colonel with the Army of the Potomac. In 1863, Maj. Gen. Joseph Hooker selected Sharpe to command the Bureau of Military Information (BMI), the Army of the Potomac's intelligence operation. He served in that role until the end of the war. By the war's end, Sharpe was promoted to brevet major general.

After the war, Sharpe mixed his law practice and the pursuit of his interests in New York state Republican Party politics with several stints in Federal government service. He went to Europe to investigate the Lincoln assassination conspiracy for the State Department. He served as a U.S. Marshal in New York City and as Surveyor of the Port of New York. In 1878, he was elected to the New York State Assembly and served for four years, for two of which he was selected as Speaker. In 1884 he was appointed head of the U.S. Commission to Central and South America and then he ended his career with an appointment to the U.S. Board of General Appraisers in 1890.

== Education and early career ==
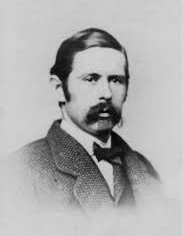
Sharpe in the 1850s

Born February 26, 1828, in Kingston, New York, Sharpe earned his bachelor's degree at Rutgers University in 1847 and then studied law at Yale University. He entered private practice in New York City, New York from 1848 to 1851, with the firm of Bidwell & Strong (now known as Cadwalader, Wickersham & Taft). He was Secretary of the United States Legation in Vienna, Austrian Empire for the U.S. State Department from 1851 to 1852. He resumed private practice in Kingston from 1854 to 1861.

== Civil War military career ==
Sharpe had joined the 20th New York State Militia Regiment, based in Kingston, after returning to the United States from his service abroad. By 1861, he had been commissioned to the rank of captain and had been elected to the command of Company B. After the Confederate attack on Fort Sumter in April, the regiment served on guard duty at Annapolis and Baltimore until July. His company was dissolved back in New York for lack of troops at the end of August and Sharpe returned to civilian life.

Sharpe took up his practice of law again and pursued his interest in local Republican politics. However, in July 1862, when President Lincoln issued a call for volunteers, the governor asked Sharpe to help raise a new regiment. He did so and was appointed colonel of volunteers of the 120th New York Infantry. Sharpe and the regiment served in the defenses of Washington and from October onward with the Army of the Potomac. They participated in the Battle of Fredericksburg and the infamous Mud March in December but did not see heavy action.

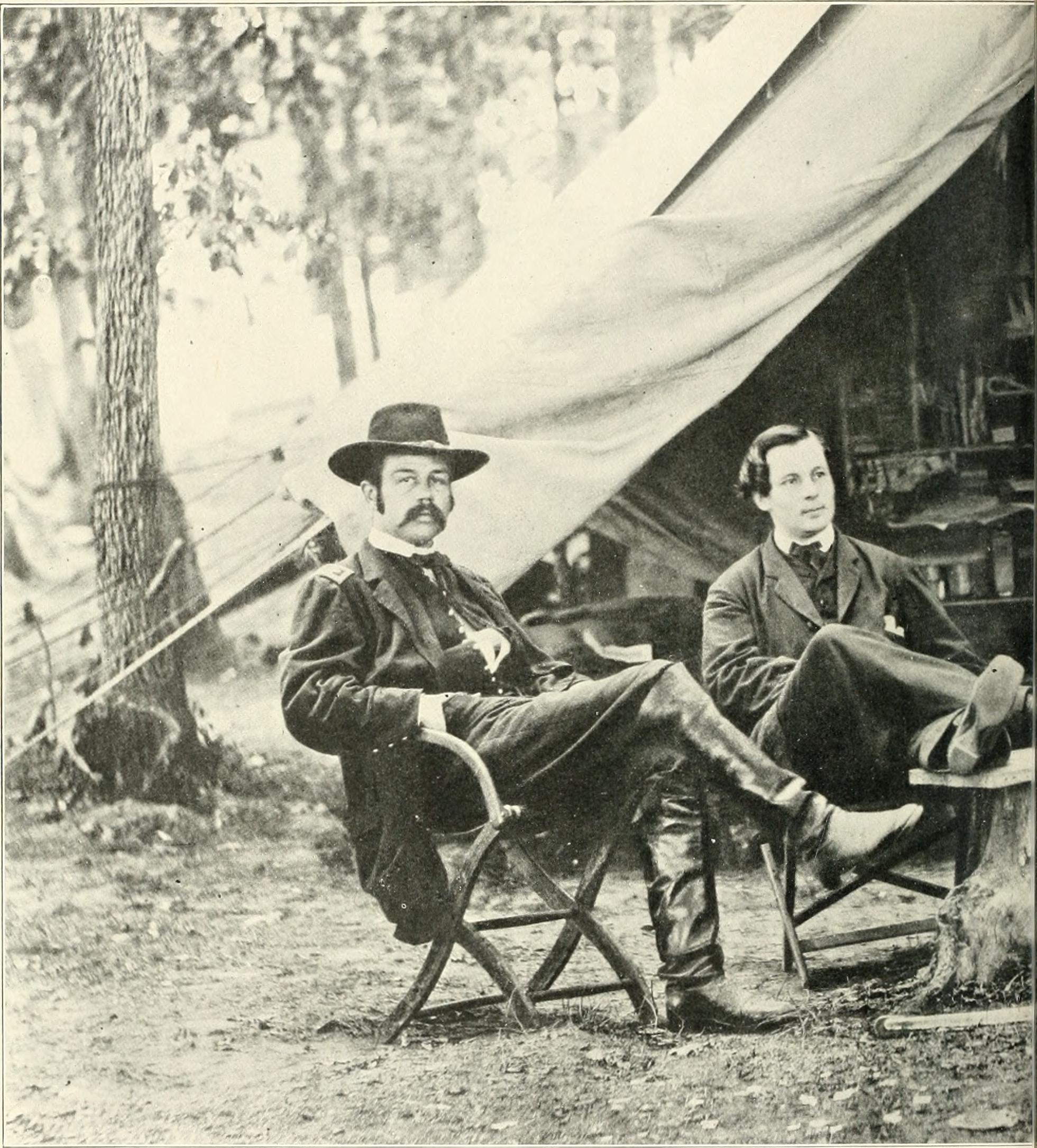
Sharpe and John C. Babcock with the BMI in 1864

In January 1863, Maj. Gen. Joseph Hooker was appointed to command the Army of the Potomac and he sought to rebuild the army’s intelligence operation. In February, he selected Sharpe to command what became the Bureau of Military Information (BMI) and ultimately appointed him deputy provost marshal general of the Army of the Potomac, under Provost Marshal Brig. Gen. Marsena R. Patrick. Sharpe then built up the BMI staff of analysts, scouts and guides, and civilian support. By the time of the Army of the Potomac’s next major operation at Chancellorsville, in late April, Sharpe had obtained the service of three additional analysts and 24 scouts and guides.

The BMI was the U.S. military’s first “all source” intelligence organization. As the bureau’s commander, Sharpe deployed scouts and enlisted civilian agents to report on activities behind enemy lines. He and his assistant analysts interrogated prisoners, deserters, and refugees, and analyzed documents (mostly letters and newspapers). Sharpe also obtained reports from cavalry reconnaissance, Balloon Corps observation, and Signal Corps observation and flag signal intercepts for his analysis. He and his assistants wrote the BMI’s reports.

Sharpe served as the head of the BMI for the remainder of the war. His service and the BMI's work was essential to the Union's success in the Eastern Theater because of their ability to determine the whereabouts and activities of Robert E. Lee's Army of Northern Virginia, even when the two armies were out of contact and other Union arms like the cavalry were not operating effectively. On July 4, 1864, to better support all of the Union forces operating in the Richmond-Petersburg area, Lt. Gen. Ulysses S. Grant redesignated the provost marshal of the Army of the Potomac as the provost marshal of the Armies Operating Against Richmond, transferring Sharpe and the BMI to his headquarters. On February 7, 1865, Sharpe was promoted brevet brigadier general of volunteers (backdated to December 20, 1864).

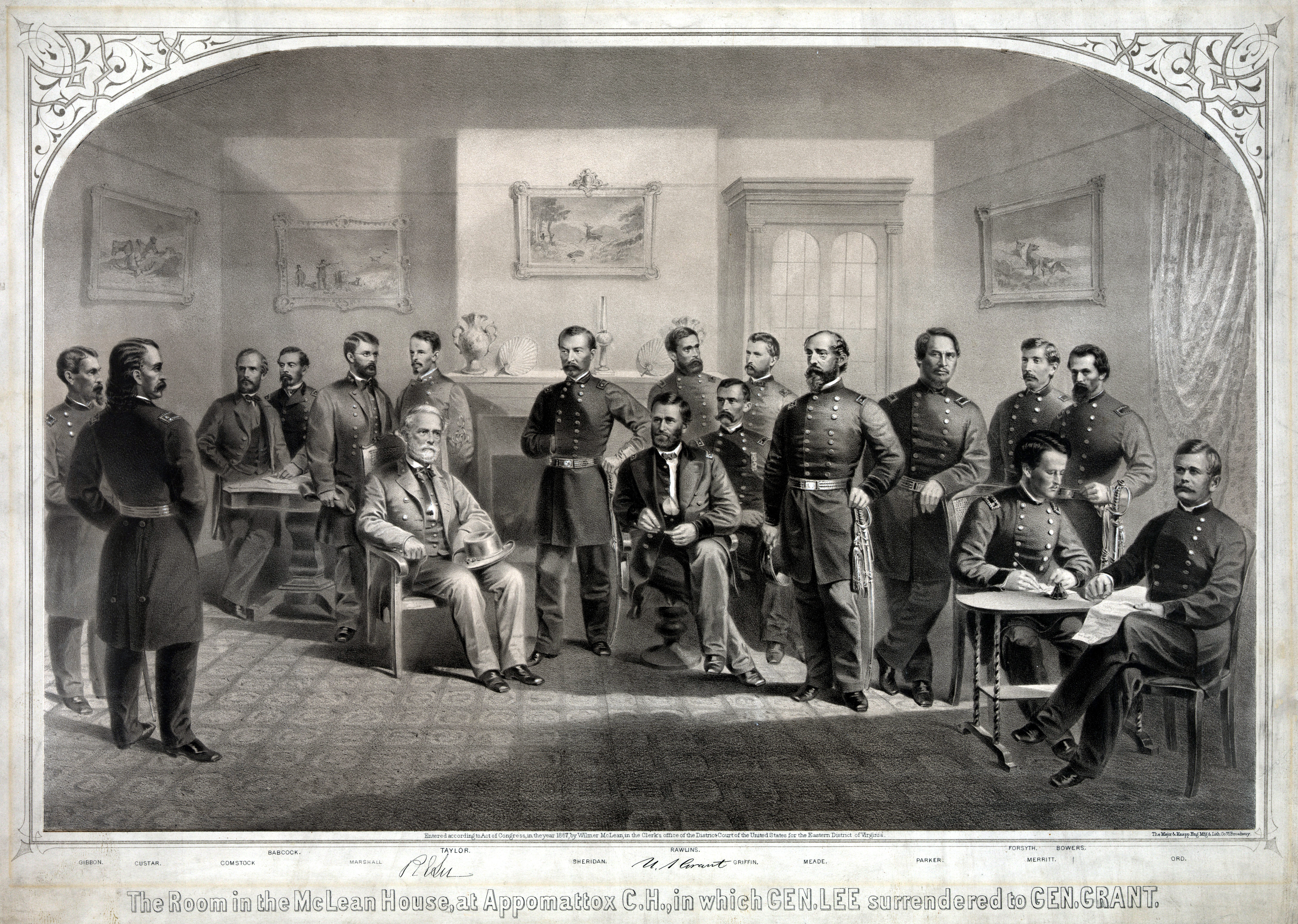
Lee's Surrender to Grant

In April 1865, after Lee’s surrender at Appomattox Court House, as deputy provost marshal general, Sharpe paroled 28,000 Confederate Army soldiers, among them General Lee. At that point, the BMI’s mission ended and it went out of existence. In June, Grant promoted Sharpe to brevet major general of volunteers (effective March 13, 1865) and Sharpe returned to Kingston with his regiment and soon mustered out with them.

== Postbellum career ==
=== Federal service and New York Republican Party politics ===
After the war, Sharpe returned to his career in law in New York and the pursuit of his interests in politics. In 1867, however, based on his knowledge of Sharpe's service as an intelligence officer, Secretary of State William H. Seward, asked Sharpe to become a special agent of the U.S. State Department and go to Europe to locate and investigate Americans who might have been involved in the assassination of President Abraham Lincoln. Seward was particularly interested in finding John Surratt, whose mother Mary Surratt had been hanged as one of the assassination conspirators, as well as former Confederate Secretary of State Judah P. Benjamin. Sharpe found no evidence of either's participation in the conspiracy. Surratt was brought back to the United States and put on trial in a civilian court. The trial ended with a hung jury and Surratt was freed and not tried again.

In 1868, with his growing involvement in New York Republican politics and his relationship with Ulysses Grant from the war, Sharpe became a delegate to the 1868 Republican national convention and campaigned for Grant's nomination for the presidency and then for his election in November. In September 1869, Sharpe was appointed to the Central Committee of the Republican Party of New York and in 1873 he was appointed to the party executive committee. In 1870, President Grant appointed Sharpe United States Marshal for the Southern District of New York as part of Grant's plan to break the Tweed Ring’s hold on the government of New York City. Sharpe oversaw the census that demonstrated that the Democratic victories in the 1868 elections had been due to fraud—a form of ballot box stuffing. He and his marshals also oversaw voter registration and the conduct of elections until Sharpe left the post in 1873.

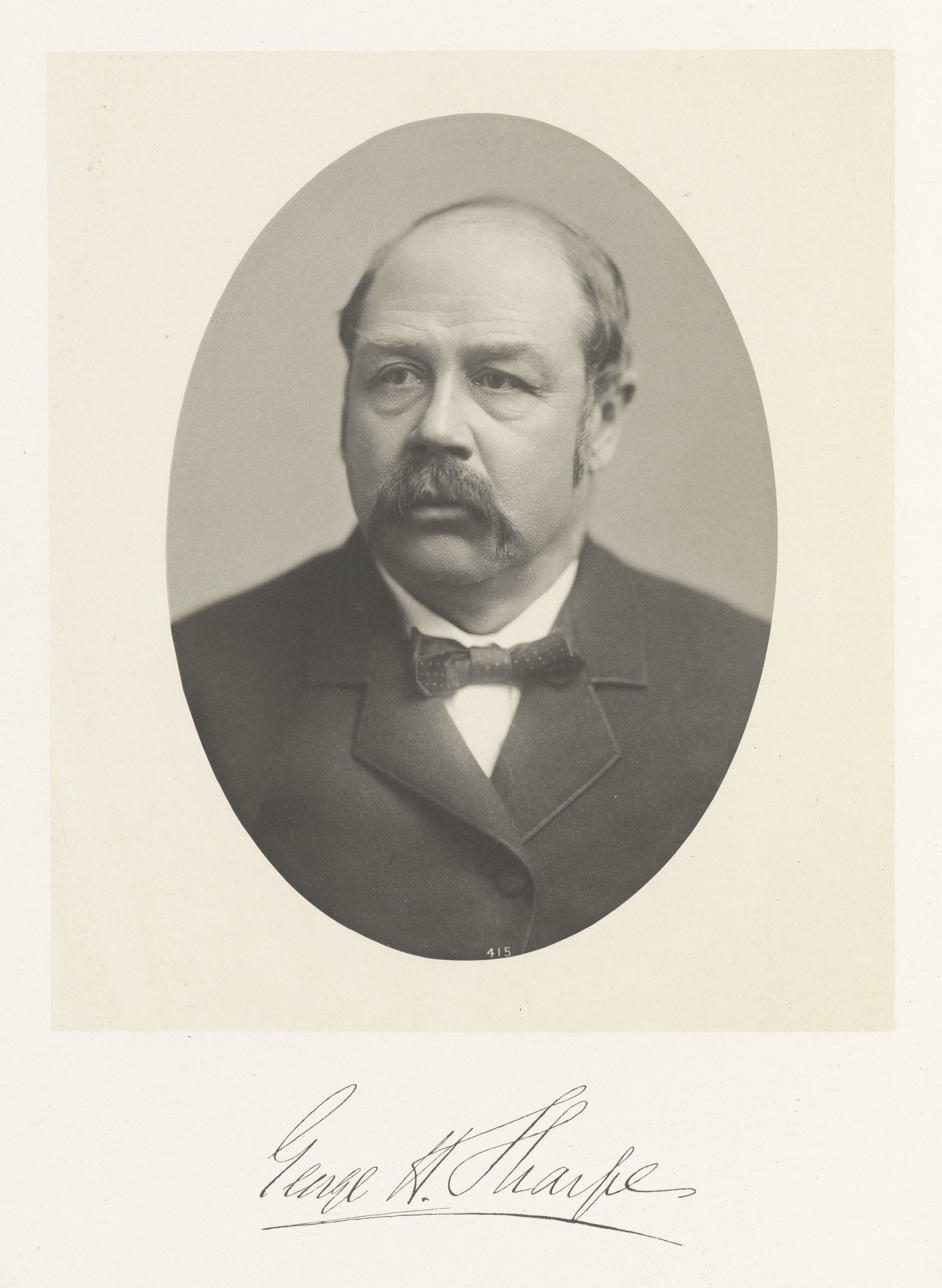
Sharpe in the 1870s

In 1873, Grant appointed Sharpe Surveyor of the Port of New York, under Collector of Customs Chester A. Arthur. At the time, the New York Custom House was the single largest source of revenue for the federal government. It was the practice of the day for the party in power to appoint the officers and employees of the Custom House and for them in turn to make contributions to the party. Sharpe conducted his duties accordingly, although he and Arthur did not dismiss any employees for failure to contribute and Sharpe ran the Surveyor's Office efficiently. By 1877, however, attitudes toward the civil service and political patronage had shifted and President Rutherford Hayes asked Arthur and his principal subordinates, Surveyor Sharpe and Naval Officer Alonzo B. Cornell to resign. They refused and Hayes removed them from office the next year.

=== Service in the New York State Assembly ===
After returning from Washington, Sharpe immersed himself in state politics. He won election to the New York State Assembly (Ulster Co., 1st D.) in November 1878. He was given chairmanship of the insurance committee of the Assembly. A year later he was reelected to the Assembly and won the Speakership. His performance as Speaker was praised for its fairness by the press and even by his opponents.

In the fall of 1880, Sharpe again served as a delegate at the Republican national convention. The New York delegation was led by Senator Roscoe Conkling, who was a leader of the Stalwarts faction of the party, which supported nominating President Grant for a third term and opposed the civil service reforms advocated by Republicans like President Hayes. Sharpe was the convention floor leader supporting Grant’s nomination. Nevertheless, the Stalwarts could not muster sufficient votes to nominate Grant. The party nominated James A. Garfield for president and, after Sharpe’s initial suggestion, to promote party unity and balance the ticket geographically (albeit over Conkling’s objections), nominated Stalwart Chester Arthur for vice president.

After the convention, Sharpe campaigned hard for the Garfield ticket and they prevailed in November. Sharpe was also reelected to the Assembly. He was reappointed as Speaker in January 1881 but only after a surprising challenge from a Garfield-supported candidate. A conflict between Conkling and Garfield over New York Customs House patronage led to Conkling's resignation from the Senate. Conkling tried to force the Republicans in the Assembly to re-elect him to affirm his status as leader of the party but they declined. Sharpe, who had long been a loyal Conkling supporter, opposed his move on the grounds that it was an affront to the American system of government and that it would likely weaken support for the Republican Party. Conkling's supporters saw Sharpe's opposition as a betrayal that would damage him for the rest of his political career.

Nevertheless, Sharpe retained the support of his constituents and he was nominated and re-elected to the Assembly in November. He lost the party's nomination for Speaker to Thomas G. Alvord in January 1882 (the Speakership was won by the Democrats, who held the majority in the Assembly) and he continued to be vilified by Conkling supporters. Sharpe's fortunes rose again in Washington, however, with Chester Arthur in the White House after Garfield's assassination the year before. Sharpe and Arthur had served together in New York Republican politics since the war. They had become friends and Sharpe served as one of Arthur's informal advisers, visiting him frequently in Washington. At the Republican state convention in September, party leaders were fiercely divided over a challenge to Governor Alonzo B. Cornell and the Stalwarts' ultimate nomination of Charles J. Folger to replace him was obtained partly by fraud. That intensified a strong public sentiment against machine candidates. Sharpe was not renominated for his seat in the Assembly and Folger and the Republicans suffered at the polls.

=== State party politics and Federal service again ===
After their losses in 1882, the Republican Party reformed its candidate selection process, reducing the control of the Stalwart machine and allowing some greater participation by party members. Sharpe remained Chairman of the Executive Committee. He represented Ulster County at the State Republican Convention in September 1883 (but was not nominated for the Assembly).

In April 1884, Sharpe's rival in Ulster County, Congressman Thomas Cornell, blocked his nomination to the state party convention, as Stalwart candidates fared badly across the state. Sharpe was not able to obtain a nomination to either the state or national party conventions. He did attend the national convention and supported President Arthur for a second term but the nomination went to James G. Blaine.

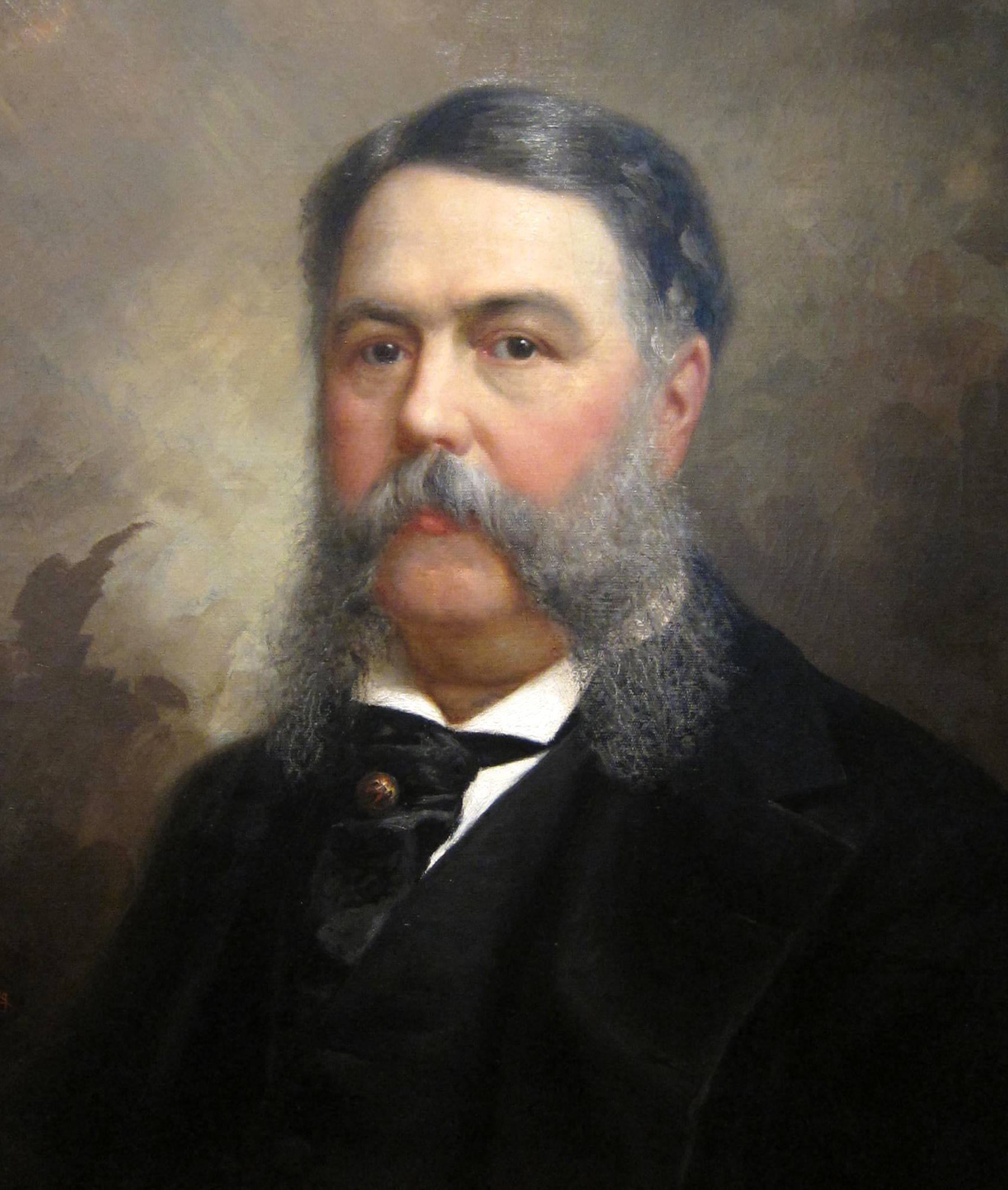
Chester A. Arthur by Ole Peter Hansen Balling

In July 1884, President Arthur appointed Sharpe head of the U.S. Commission to Central and South America, with the rank of Envoy Extraordinary and Minister Plenipotentiary. The commission was to promote the commercial relations between the United States and Central/South American countries. Sharpe performed his duties with enthusiasm but resigned after the election of President Grover Cleveland. He advocated unsuccessfully for the nomination of outgoing President Arthur for Senator from New York.

In 1885, Arthur sought to appoint Sharpe as the Judge Advocate General of the Army just before the end of his term but was opposed by the Army and Republican senators who believed that an appointment made by Arthur would not be confirmed. Later in the year, Sharpe served on the first local board of the New Paltz Normal school. Remaining active in state politics, he was elected to the Republican state convention in September, chairing the Committee on Contested Seats. He supported the campaign of William M. Evarts against Levi P. Morton for the U.S. Senate.

The next year he led the Ulster County delegation to the state convention in September. But in 1887, he was not able to attain election to the convention at all. It had been alleged that Sharpe had not supported the Blaine ticket in 1884, which Sharpe denied, and he faced continuing opposition within the party from Thomas Cornell and former supporters of Roscoe Conkling. The defeat essentially ended Sharpe's career in electoral politics, although he remained active with the party for some time. In November 1889, Sharpe and other Republicans allied unsuccessfully with Democrats in Ulster County in an attempt to defeat the Republican ticket there. In January 1889, Sharpe was appointed president of the National Bank of Rondout and he gave up his law practice to focus on those duties.

=== Connection with Civil War veterans ===
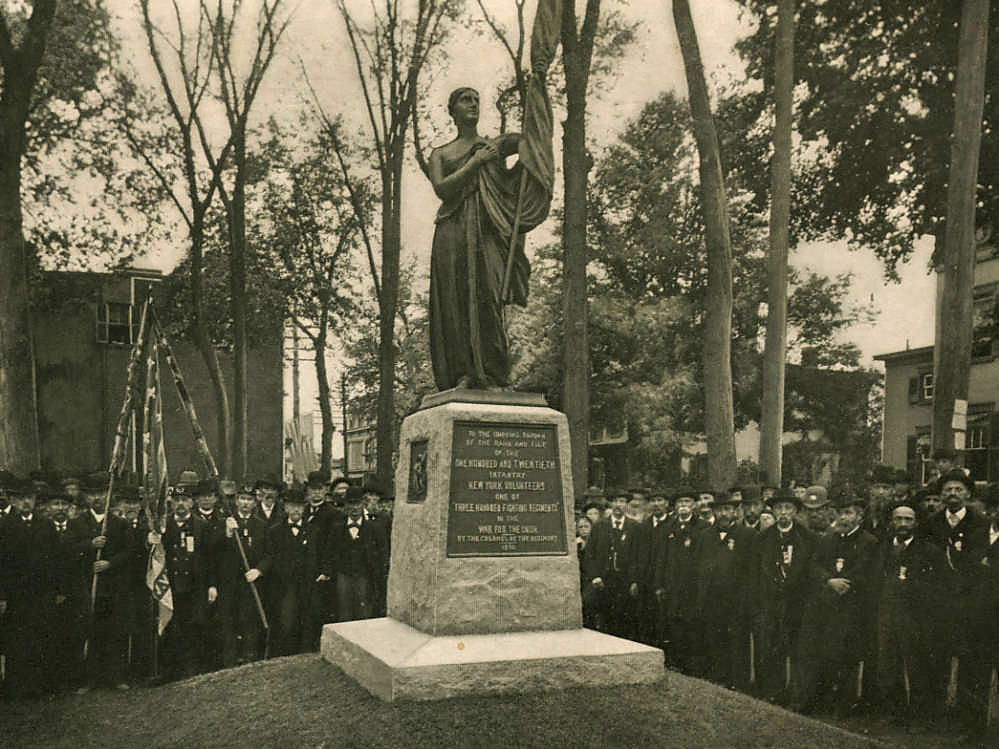
Dedication of monument to 120th NY, Kingston, NY, October 17, 1896; photo: Friends of Historic Kingston

While focusing on his political career, former Maj. Gen. Sharpe also remained in touch with the Union Army veterans he served with during the war. He held executive positions in several veterans organizations: Corresponding Secretary for the Army of the Potomac Society, member of the Executive Committee of the One Hundred and Twentieth Regimental Union, director in the Third Army Corps union, Vice President of the 120th New York in the Second Brigade New Jersey Volunteers, and commander of the New York Commandery of the Military Order of the Loyal Legion of the United States. He attended the reunion at the 25th anniversary of the Battle of Gettysburg in 1888 and the dedication of the monument to the 120th NY at Gettysburg in 1889. In 1896, Sharpe commissioned and paid for a monument to the 120th NY built in the churchyard of the Old First Reformed Dutch Church in Kingston.

== Federal judicial service ==
Sharpe was nominated by President Benjamin Harrison on July 2, 1890, to the Board of General Appraisers, to a new seat created by Congress (26 Stat. 131, 136 (An act to simplify the laws in relation to the collection of the revenues)). He was confirmed by the United States Senate on July 16, 1890, and received his commission on November 16, 1890. The duty of the Board was to review decisions of United States Customs officials concerning the amount of duties to be paid on importations. Sharpe's cases involved matters from carpet wools and Cuban tobacco leaf to oils, paints, and chemicals and the plumes in women's hats. His service terminated on March 1, 1899, due to his resignation. He was succeeded by William Barberie Howell.

== Death ==
Sharpe died after an illness on January 13, 1900, in New York City.

== Personal ==
Sharpe's parents were Henry Sharpe and Helen Hasbrouck Sharpe. His grandfather was Congressman Abraham J. Hasbrouck and his great-grandfather was Joseph Hasbrouck, a lieutenant colonel in the American Revolutionary War. He is also a descendant of Louis DuBois, Huguenot colonist of New Netherland and co-founder of New Paltz, New York.

Sharpe was married to Caroline Hone Hasbrouck, daughter of Congressman Abraham Bruyn Hasbrouck (and his second cousin once removed). Their children were Severyn Bruyn Sharpe, a county judge, Henry Granville Sharpe, a United States Army officer, and Katherine Lawrence Sharpe, who married Congressman Ira Davenport. His granddaughter, Katharine Davenport Sharpe (Severyn's daughter) married Albro Newton Dana, a grandson of geologist James Dwight Dana. He died while visiting the Davenport's residence at 31 East 39th Street in Manhattan. He was buried at Wiltwyck Cemetery in Kingston.

== Sites and honors ==
Camp Sharpe Army psychological warfare training site at Gettysburg, Pennsylvania, 1944

Rutgers College Hall of Distinguished Alumni, Class of 2006

Military Intelligence Hall of Fame, Class of 2013

== See also ==
- List of American Civil War brevet generals (Union)

New York State Assembly
Preceded by Thomas Hamilton	New York State Assembly; Ulster County, 1st District; 1878–1882	Succeeded by Thomas H. Tremper
Political offices
Preceded by Thomas G. Alvord	Speaker of the New York State Assembly; 1880–1881	Succeeded by Charles E. Patterson
Legal offices
Preceded by Seat established by 26 Stat. 131	Member of the Board of General Appraisers; 1890–1899	Succeeded by William Barberie Howell
